= Camera Obscura (San Francisco) =

- U.S. National Register of Historic Places
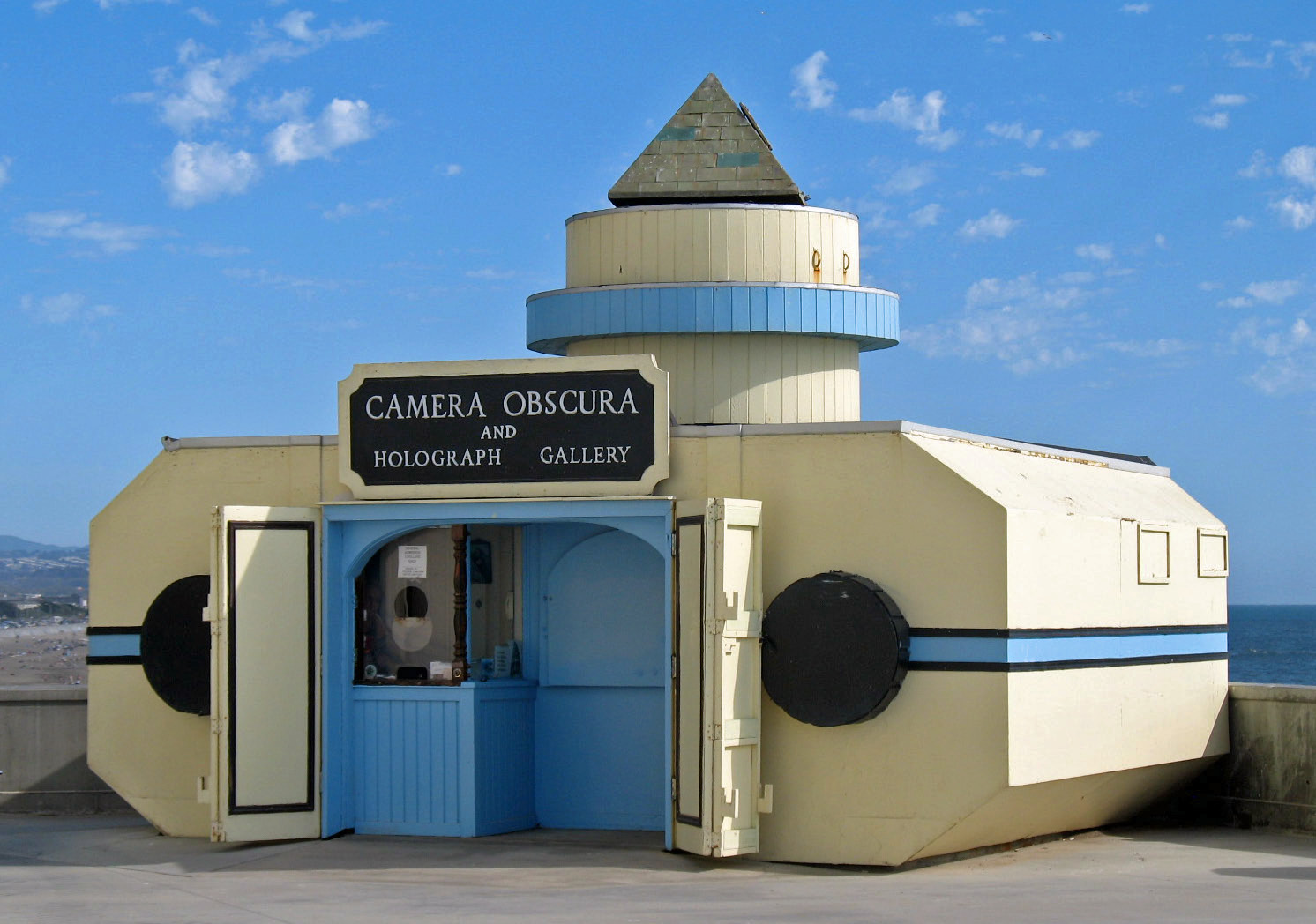

- Location within San Francisco County Location within California Location within the United States
- Location: 1096 Point Lobos Ave., San Francisco, California
- Coordinates: 37°46′41.62″N 122°30′51.16″W
- Built: 1946
- Architectural style: Novelty
- NRHP reference No.: 01000522
- Added to NRHP: April 20, 2001

The Camera Obscura is a large-scale camera obscura, in the Lands End area of the Outer Richmond District in western San Francisco, California.

It is located immediately adjacent to the Cliff House, perched on the headlands on the cliffs just north of Ocean Beach. Both the Camera and the Cliff House are owned by the National Park Service and are within the Golden Gate National Recreation Area. The Camera Obscura was added to the National Register of Historic Places in 2001 and is within the NPS Sutro Historic District.

== History ==
Camera obscuras, devices which project an image of the surroundings onto a surface using only existing exterior light sources, usually sunlight, have a long history in San Francisco. The first recorded reference to one in the city is from the 1860s (until 1891) in an attraction called Woodward's Gardens in the Mission District. A previous incarnation of the Cliff House was noted to have had a camera obscura on its fourth floor in 1896. That camera obscura was destroyed when the restaurant burned down in 1907.

When the third Cliff House opened in 1937, the owner was approached by businessman Floyd Jennings with the idea of adding a Camera Obscura to the cliffs beside the restaurant. It was installed on the site in 1946 and has been in continuous operation since then except during repairs from a 2023 storm.

It is the only Camera Obscura remaining in its original location in the United States. It is also the last remaining attraction from San Francisco's Playland amusement park and costs $3 to enter.

== Technology ==
The San Francisco Camera Obscura projects an image onto a horizontal viewing disc via a reflected image from a viewpoint at the top of the building. A metal hood in the cupola at the top of the building slowly rotates, making a full revolution in about six minutes, allowing for a 360° view around the building.

Light enters the building via an angled mirror in the metal hood. It then passed through a lens with a 150 in. (381 cm) focal length and is projected onto a parabolic white circular “table” at 7x magnification in a mostly dark room. The origin of the lens is uncertain but it appears to have been part of a telescope, likely manufactured by the Clark Lens Company of Cambridge, Massachusetts. Da Vinci is often credited with the invention of the concept.

== Preservation ==
The Camera Obscura was added to the National Register of Historic Places in 2001 for its engineering significance after nearly being removed in 2000 by the National Park Service. The price to view was raised from $1 to $2 in 2001. While the exterior of the building was extensively modified in 1957 to appear as a giant camera, the internal workings of the Camera Obscura, the basis of its placement on the National Register, have remained unchanged since its erection in 1946. The 1957 external architecture was eligible to be evaluated for historical significance upon reaching fifty years of age in 2007. It is a rare example of 'duck architecture' where the building resembles the item or service it is promoting. It also attracts visitors interested in the origins of photography.

== See also ==
- National Register of Historic Places listings in San Francisco, California
- Sutro Historic District
