= Seal Rocks (San Francisco) =

Rock islands in Pacific Ocean in western San Francisco, California

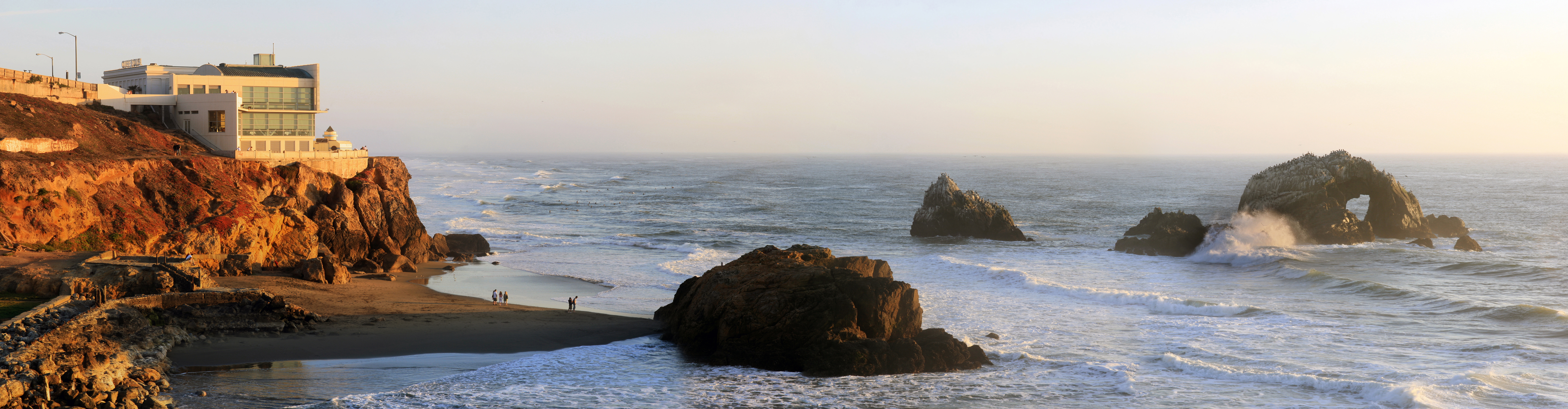
- The Seal Rock and Cliff House.

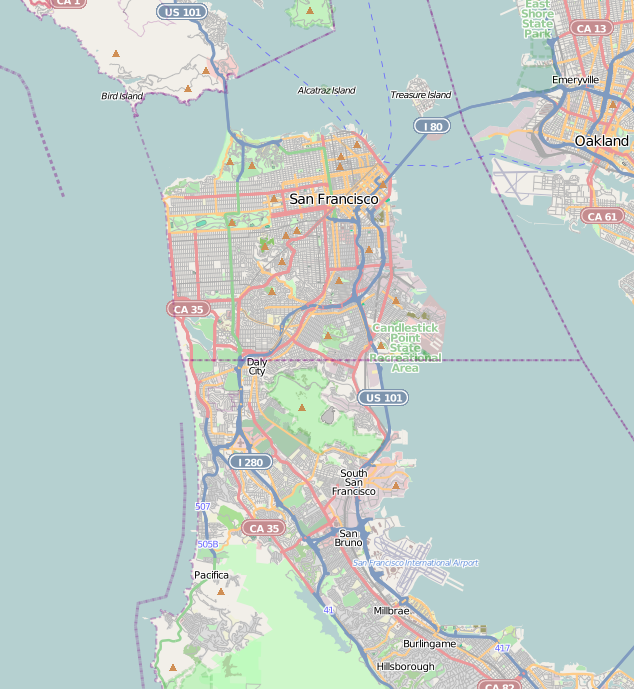
- Location within San Francisco Location within San Francisco Bay Area Location within California Location within the United States

Geography
- Location: Northern California
- Coordinates: 37.77826°N 122.51636°W
- Adjacent to: Pacific Ocean

Administration
- United States
- State: California
- County: San Francisco
- City: San Francisco

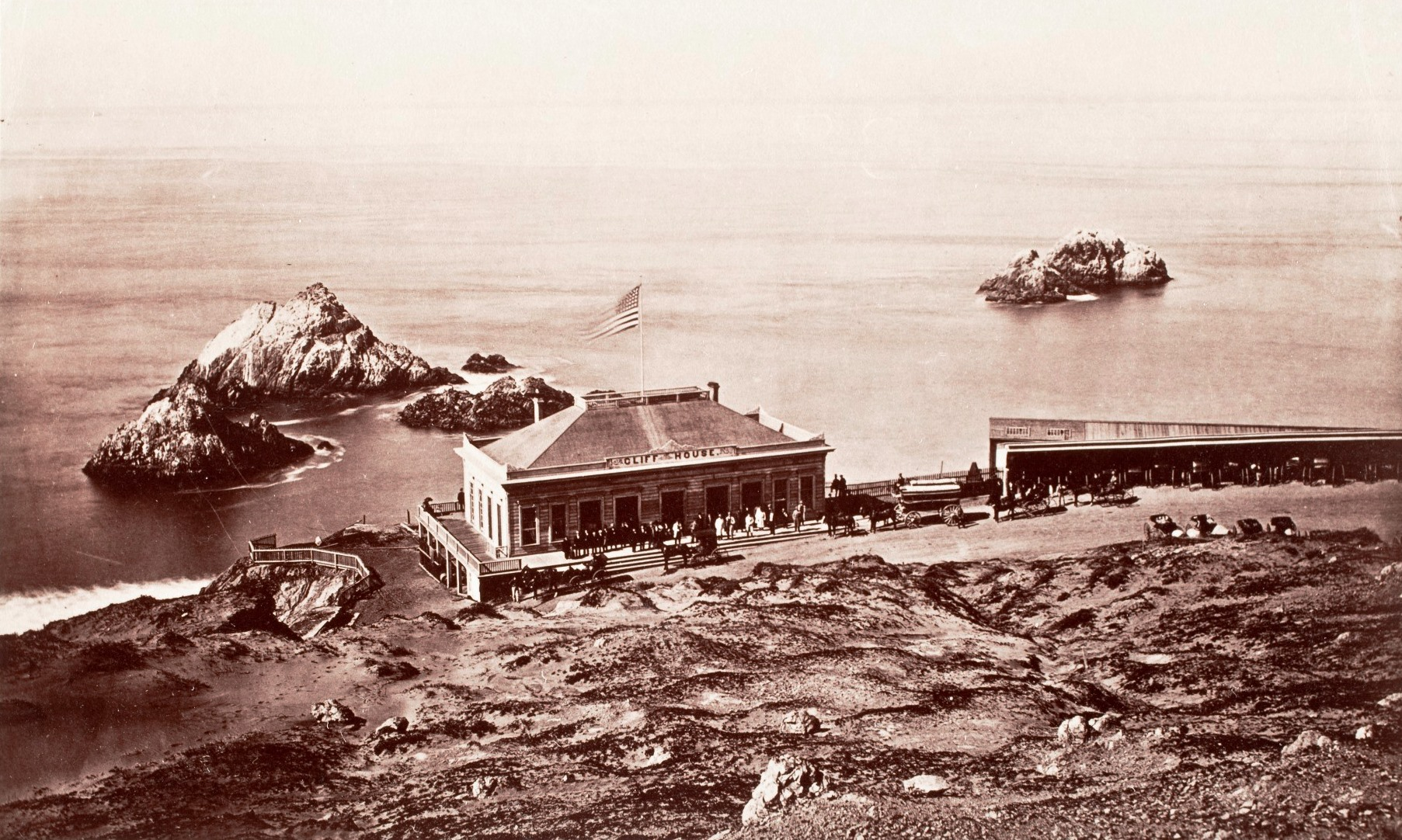
"Sea Lion Rock, Cliff House" photograph circa 1868 by Carleton Watkins.

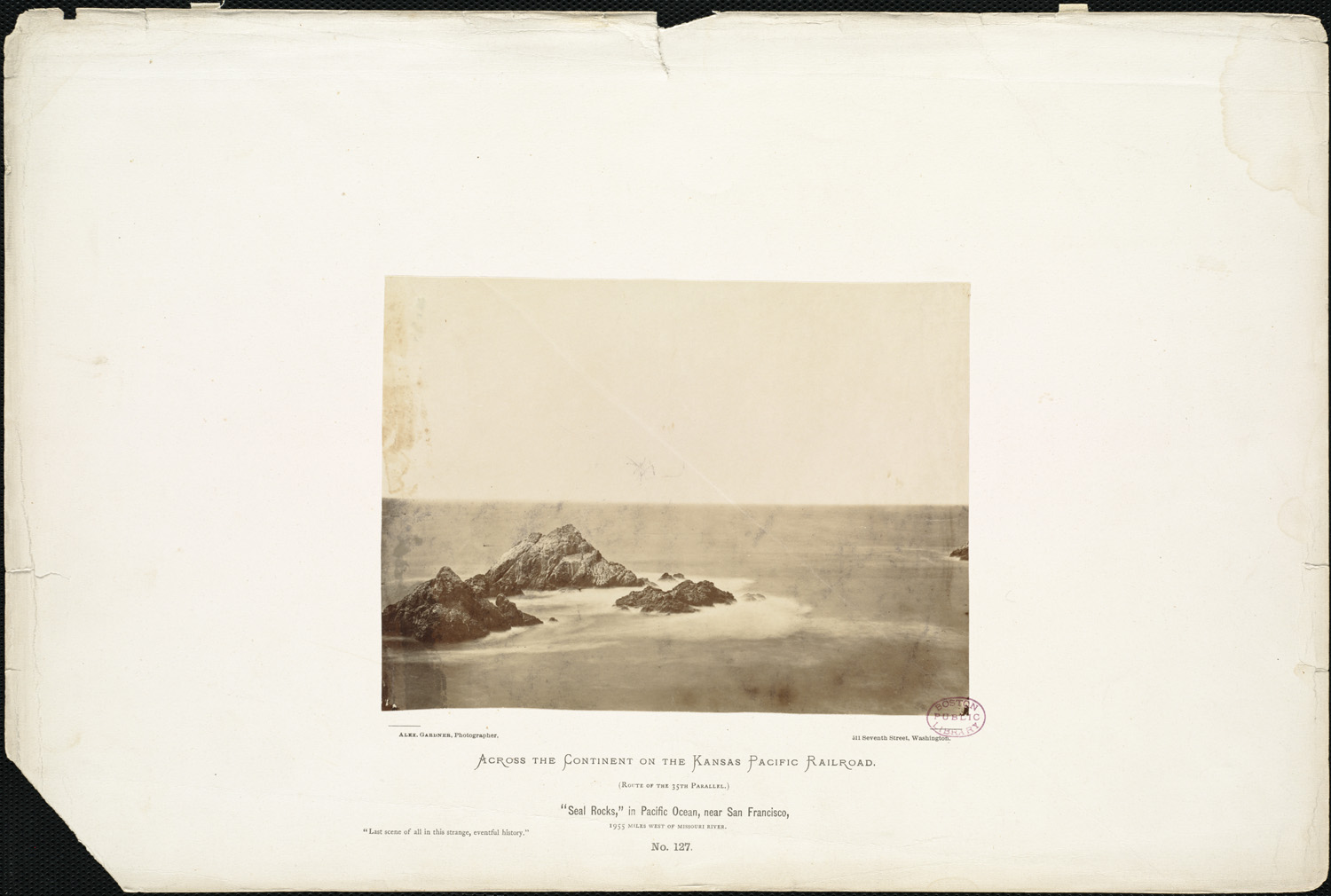
Perhaps by Alexander Gardner, 'Seal Rocks' in Pacific Ocean, near San Francisco, from Across the Continent on the Kansas Pacific Railway, 1869.

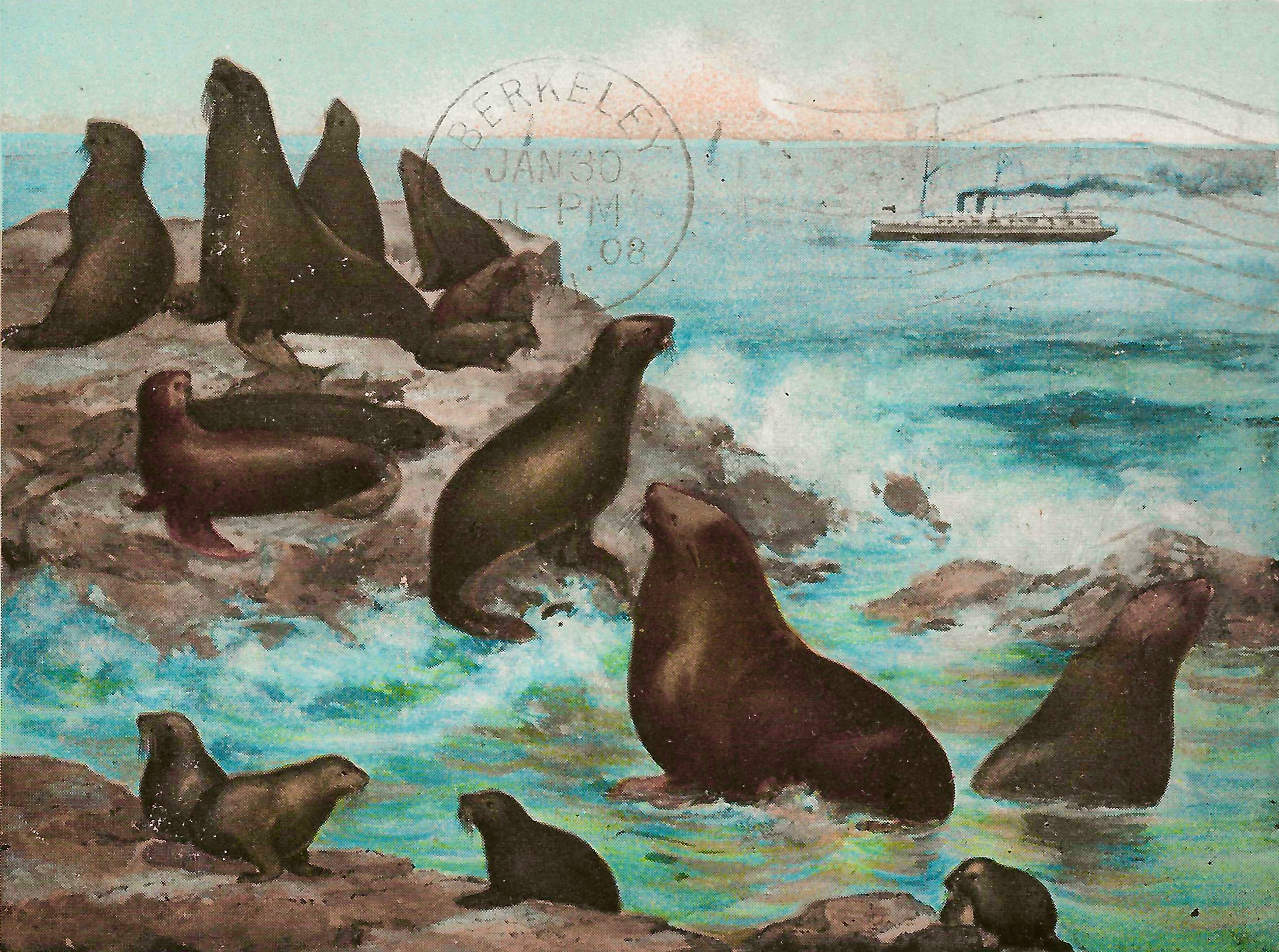
Seal Rocks, Cliff House, San Francisco, California.

Seal Rocks is a group of small rock formation islands in the Lands End area of the Outer Richmond District on the West Side of San Francisco, California, United States. They are located just offshore in the Pacific Ocean, at the north end of the Ocean Beach, near the Cliff House and Sutro Baths ruins.

The name is derived from the population of Steller's sea lions (Eumetopias jubatus) and California sea lions (Zalophus californianus), who haul out on the rock. Both species are often colloquially called "seals". The formations and wildlife are protected within the Golden Gate National Recreation Area.

== Geology ==
Near the end of the last ice age, this part of the coastline was thought to be between eight and twenty five miles westward of its current position - around five thousand years ago, with the melting of the ice, the sea level rose to its current level.

The coastal features found here today were formed by the actions of waves, wind, and the movement of sand. The geology of this part of the coastline of San Francisco consists of steep rocky cliffs which are punctuated by narrow sandy pocket beaches found at the north end of the city and long sandy stretches at Ocean Beach and Fort Funston to the south. The local features, and indeed the entire San Francisco Peninsula, come from the northern aspect of the Santa Cruz Mountains. Before the urban development seen today, the area landward of Ocean Beach consisted of barren sand fields inland to Twin Peaks. The first known map of the area, dating from 1852, was made by the United States Coast Survey and describes the coastline as being entirely unaltered by humans.

The geologic layers beneath Ocean Beach, starting from the top (i.e. the youngest), are:

- Placed fill, from various construction activities over the last 100 years or so. The depth of this placed fill varies, but in 1985 it was then estimated to be between 7 and 16 feet (2.1 and 4.9 m) deep.
- Dune sands, estimated to be 13 to 26 feet (4.0 to 7.9 m) deep.
- Colma Formation
- Merced Formation
- Bedrock. The depth to bedrock is estimated to be between 350 and 400 feet (110 and 120 m).

The Colma and Merced Formations consist generally of poorly-sorted sandy deposits, probably deposited during some earlier period of greater sea levels. The Colma Formation is found under the dune sands and also extends inland.

== See also ==
- 49-Mile Scenic Drive
- Cliff House, San Francisco
- Lands End, San Francisco
- List of islands of California
- Sutro Heights Park
- Sutro Historic District
