= USS San Francisco Memorial =

War memorial in San Francisco's Lands End Park

Coordinates: 37.782807°N 122.511544°W

- United States
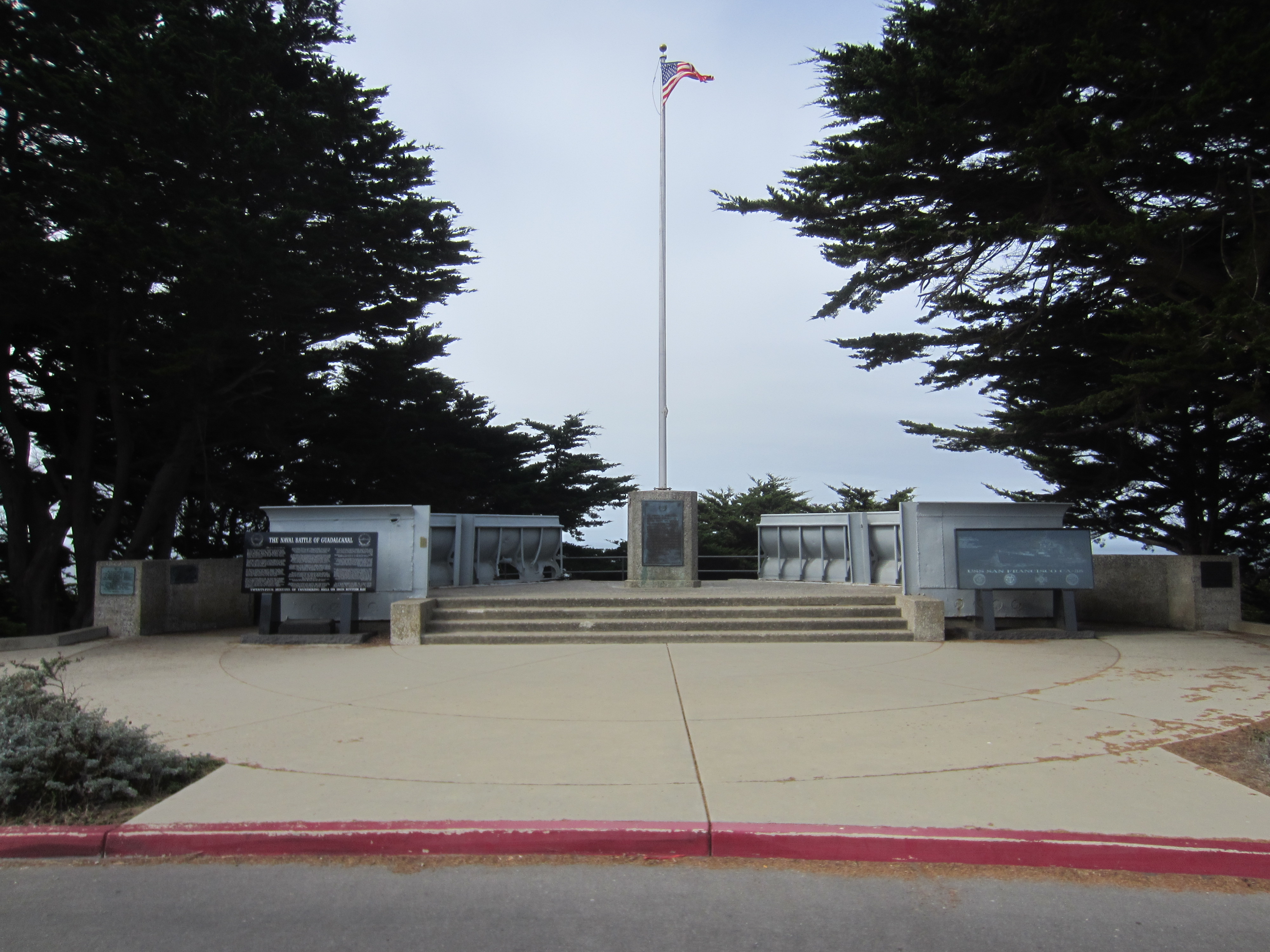
- For Casualties of the USS San Francisco
- Location: San Francisco, California

The USS San Francisco Memorial is a war memorial installed in San Francisco's Lands End, in the U.S. state of California. The memorial has a plaque commemorating the approximately 100 sailors and seven Marines who died aboard the cruiser USS San Francisco. The memorial is "oriented towards Guadalcanal" and consists of "a shell pocked section of USS San Francisco‘s bridge wings", which were removed, unrepaired, after the battle. "The site (sic) of heavy gauge steel perforated like paper captures the fury and horror of that night better than any sculpture ever could."
