= Sutro Heights Park =

Public park in western San Francisco, California

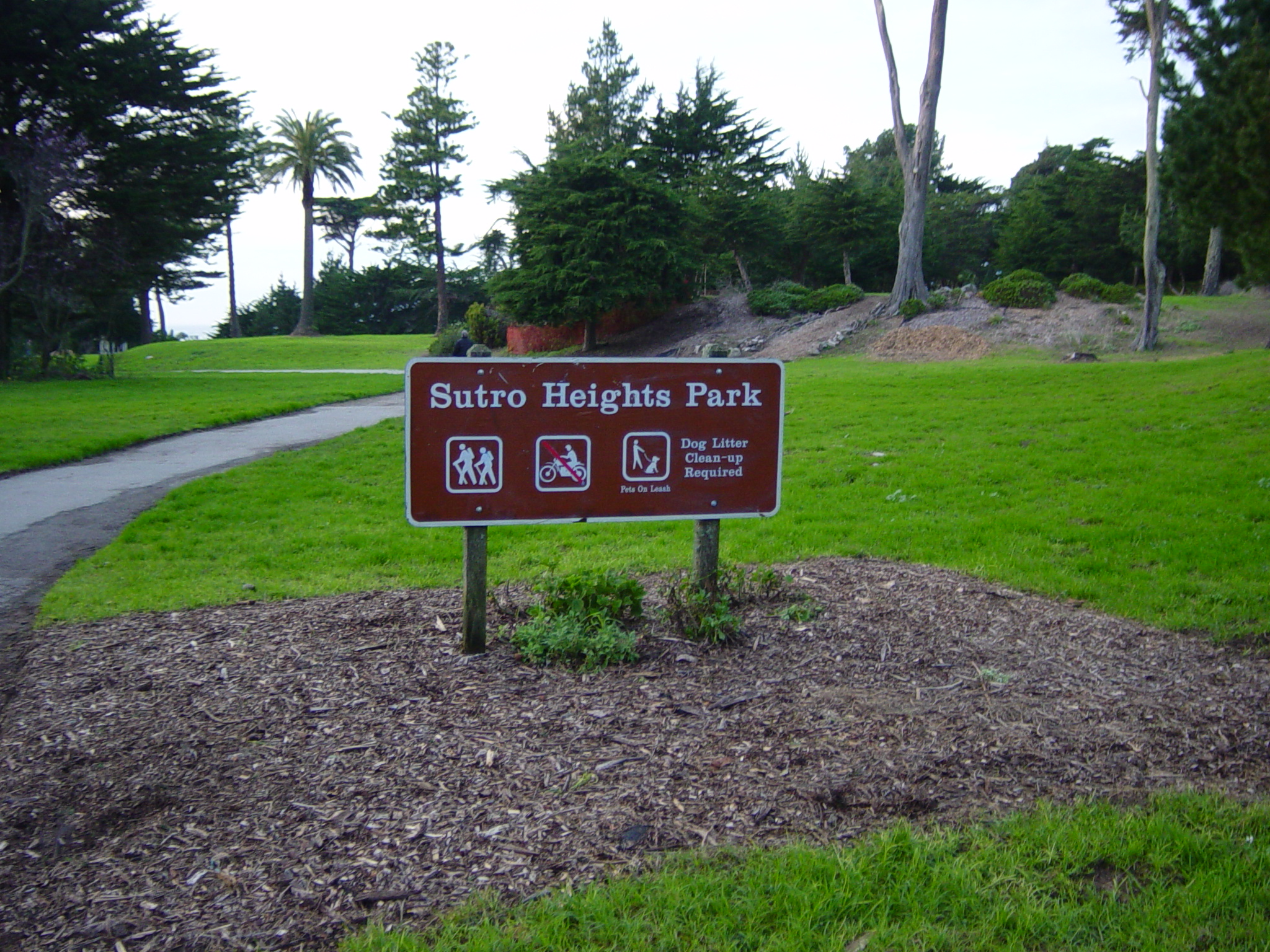

- Location within San Francisco County Location within California Location within the United States
- Location: Richmond District, San Francisco, California
- Coordinates: 37°46′42″N 122°30′40″W
- Area: 18 acres (7.3 ha)
- Operator: Golden Gate National Recreation Area

Sutro Heights Park is a historic public park in the Outer Richmond District located on the West Side of San Francisco, California. It is within the Golden Gate National Recreation Area and the Sutro Historic District.

It is located above the Cliff House in the Lands End area, with views of the Seal Rocks, Ocean Beach, and the Pacific Ocean.

== History ==
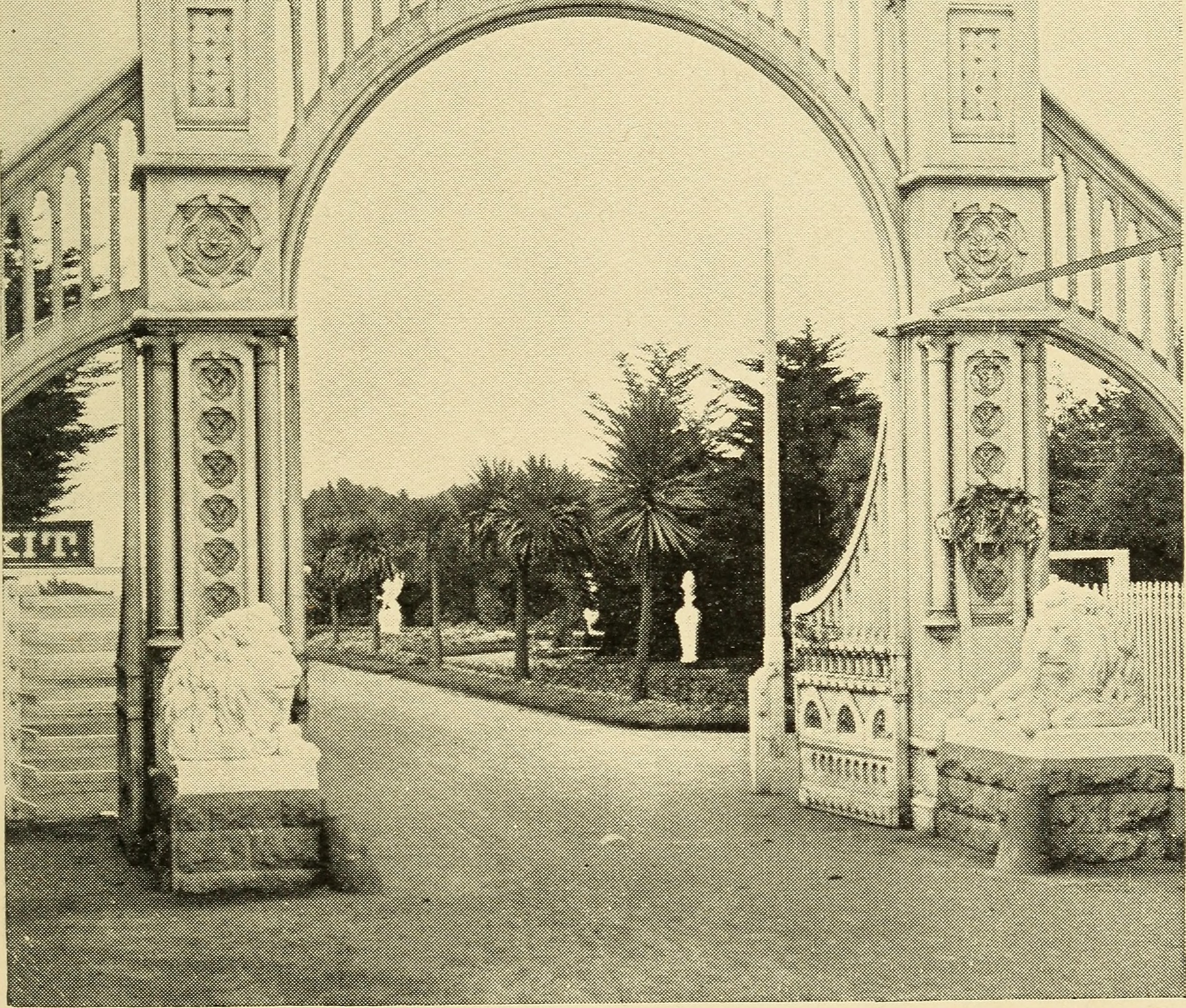
Entrance to Sutro Heights gardens, 1895

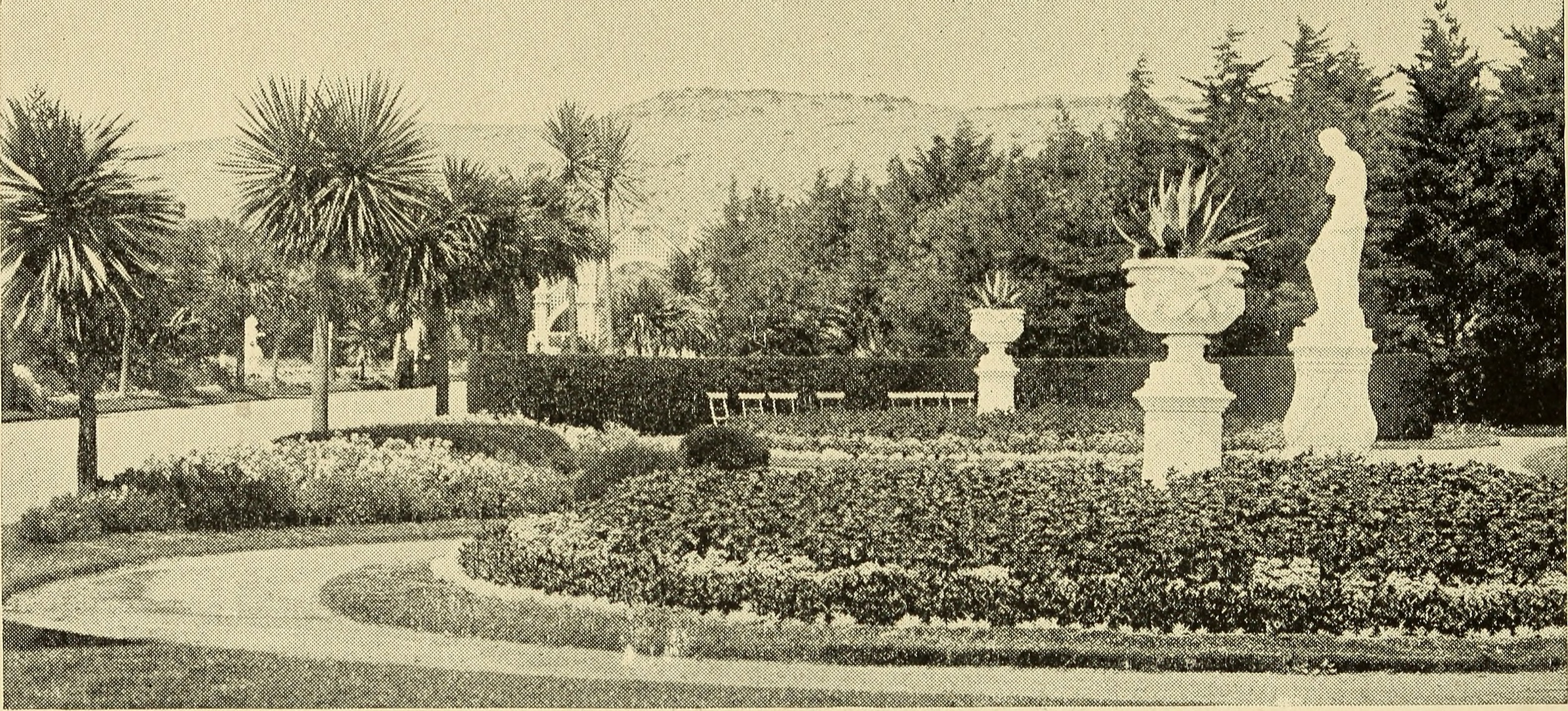
Sutro Heights gardens, 1895

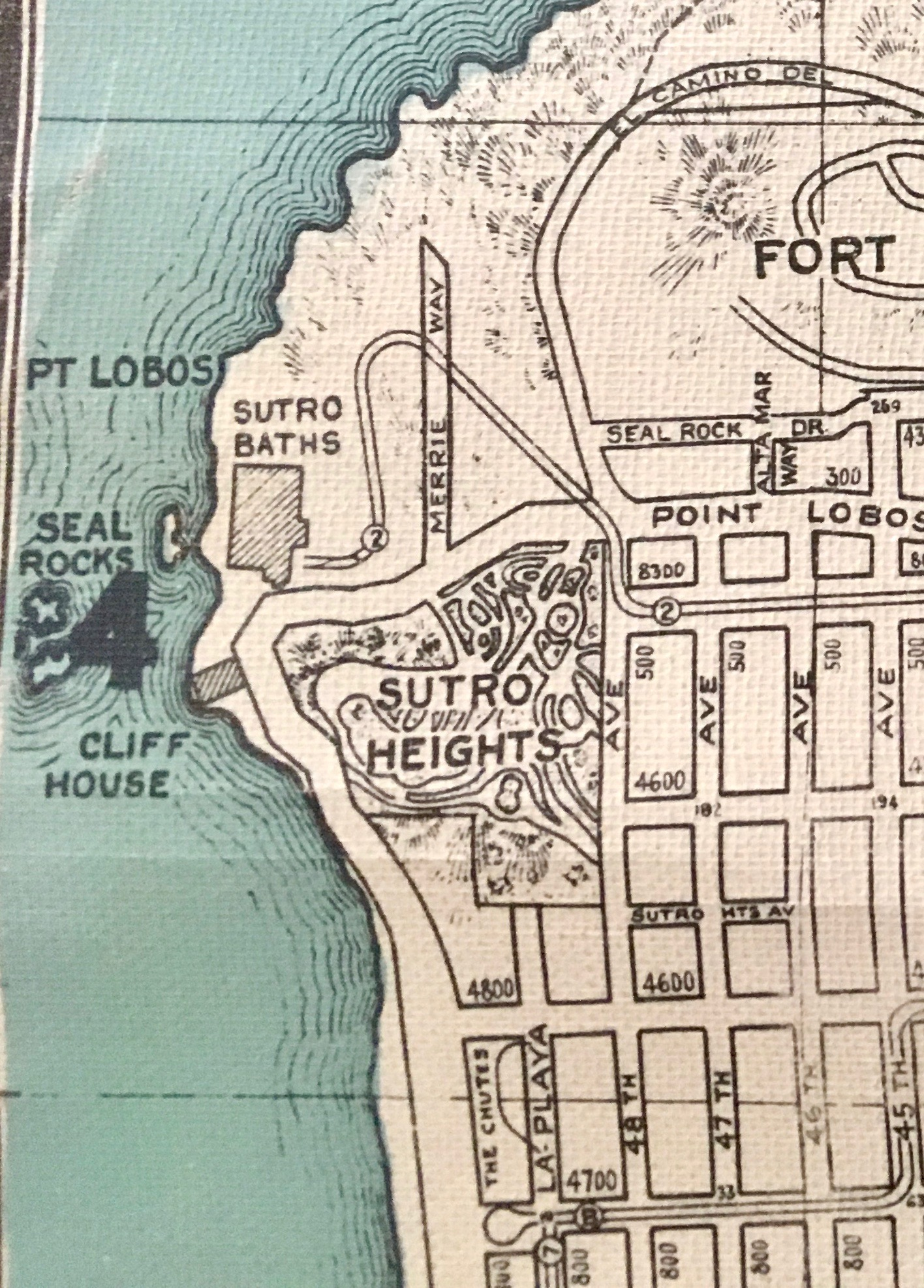
Street map, 1937

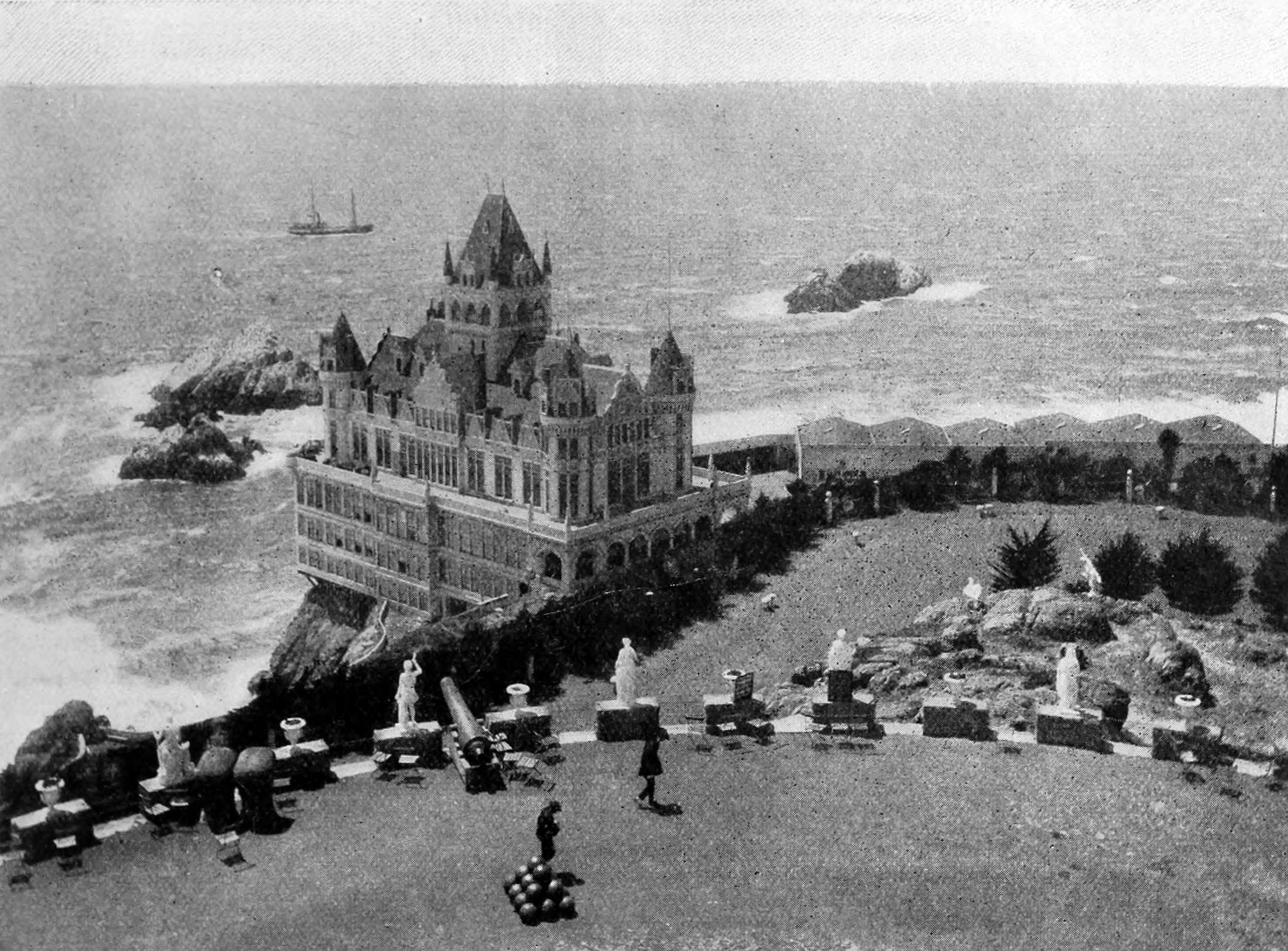
From observation plaza, towards the second Cliff House

The 18-acre (7.3-hectare) park is on the site of the former "Sutro Heights" estate of Adolph Sutro, a Comstock Lode silver baron, and a major land owner/developer in and mayor of San Francisco.

In 1881, Adolf Sutro purchased 22 acres (8.9 ha) of undeveloped land south of Point Lobos (San Francisco) and north of Ocean Beach at the western edge of the city. It included a promontory overlooking the Pacific, with scenic views of the Marin Headlands, Mount Tamalpais, and the Golden Gate. Sutro built his mansion on a rocky ledge there, above the first Cliff House.

The grounds consisted of a spacious turreted mansion, a carriage house, and outbuildings set in expansive gardens. The estate dominated the Lands End area, with an elaborate entrance gate. He spent in excess of a million dollars to recreate an Italian style garden. It was filled with fountains, planted urns, and statues, Victorian flower beds, hedge mazes, parterres, forests of trees, a glass plant conservatory, and other garden structures. Vista points included the "observation plaza" overlooking the Cliff House, and the "Dolce far Niente Balcony," a long terrace-like structure along the cliff overlooking Ocean Beach. To provide garden decorations, he imported over 200 concrete replicas of Greek and Roman statuary from Belgium, to provide examples of European culture to visitors.

By 1883 Sutro opened his estate's gardens, named Sutro Heights, to the public and allowed strolling the grounds for the donation of a dime. That small fee helped to pay the 17 gardeners, machinists, and drivers he employed to maintain the grounds.

Other features he developed on his land holdings in the Lands End area include: the Sutro Baths (1894–1964), the second and elaborate Victorian style Cliff House (1896–1907) and an amusement park named Sutro Pleasure Grounds at Merrie Way (1896–1898). To provide inexpensive transportation for visitors to these he built a passenger steam train from downtown San Francisco to Lands End.

Adolph Sutro died in 1898, land rich but cash poor following his frustrating tenure as Mayor of San Francisco. His daughter Emma Sutro Merritt moved to the Sutro Heights estate then. As she aged she could not maintain the grounds, and the house became seriously deteriorated, though she lived there until her death in 1938. Throughout the 1920s, ‘30s, and ‘40s, people took away many of the rose garden plantings and vandalized the statues.

== Park ==
The Sutro family donated the estate to the City of San Francisco in 1938. In 1939 the Works Progress Administration (WPA) demolished the residence. Remaining statuary was removed, with the exception of The Lions, copies of those in London's Trafalgar Square at the entrance gate, and a statue of Diana the Huntress (Artemis), a concrete copy of the Louvre's Diana, itself a Roman copy of a Greek statue. The 18 acres (7.3 ha) city park then opened.

Sutro Heights Park is no longer a city park, it is part of the Golden Gate National Recreation Area. It is maintained by a neighborhood group, Friends of the GGNRA, many of whom live on the surrounding streets.

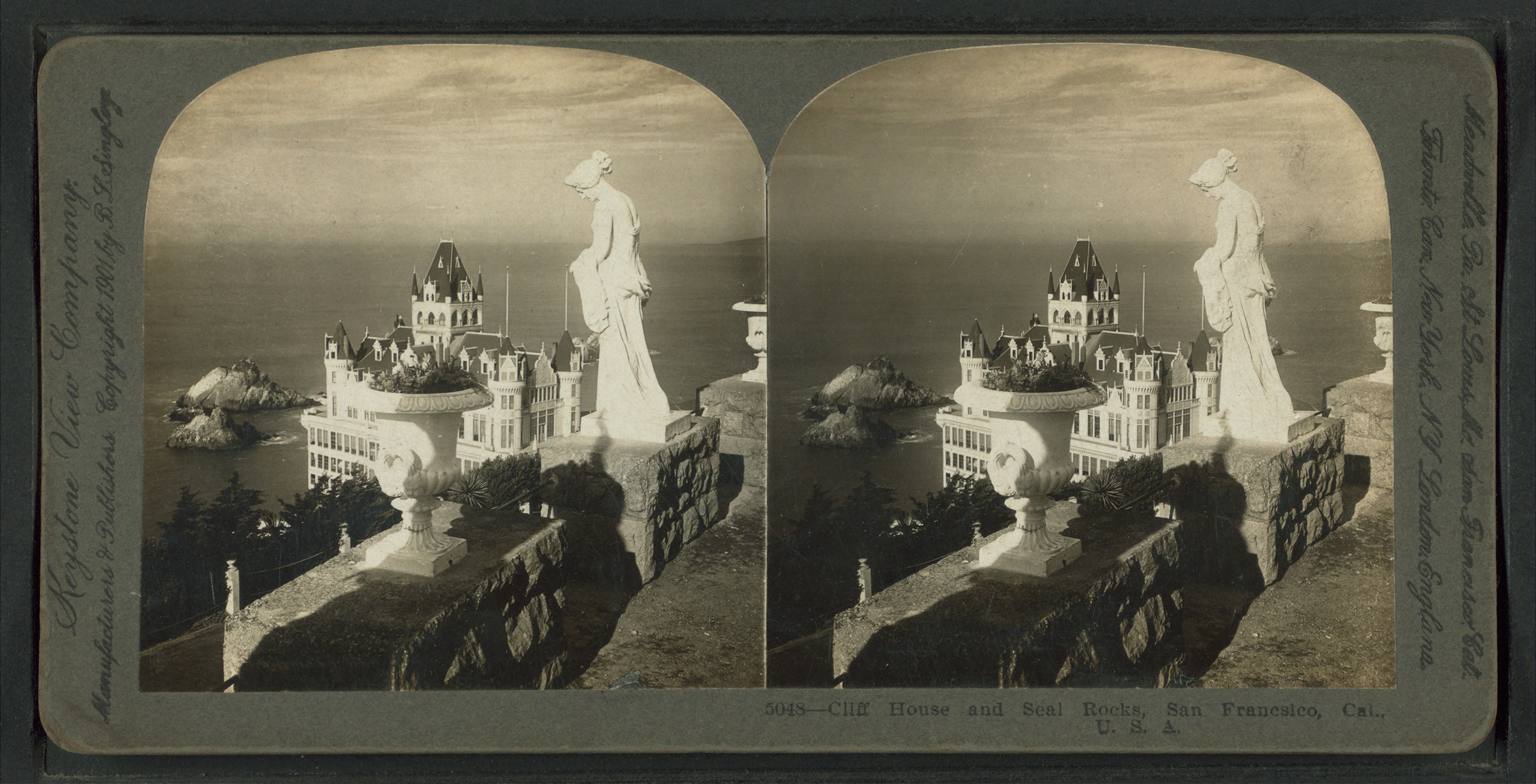
Cliff House, Seal Rocks, and statue in Sutro Heights, c. 1896–1907

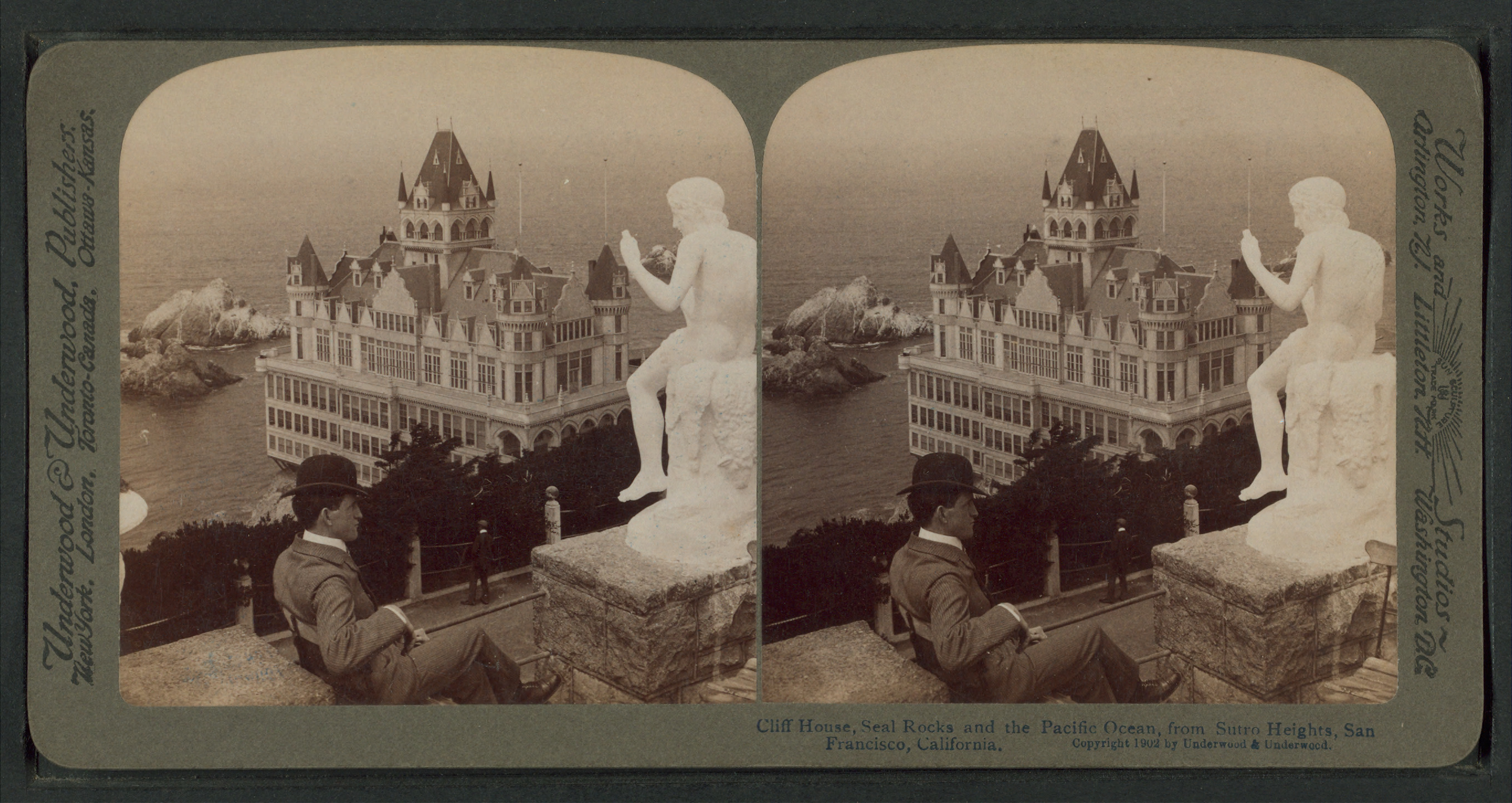
Second Cliff House from Sutro Heights gardens, c. 1896–1907

Sutro Heights

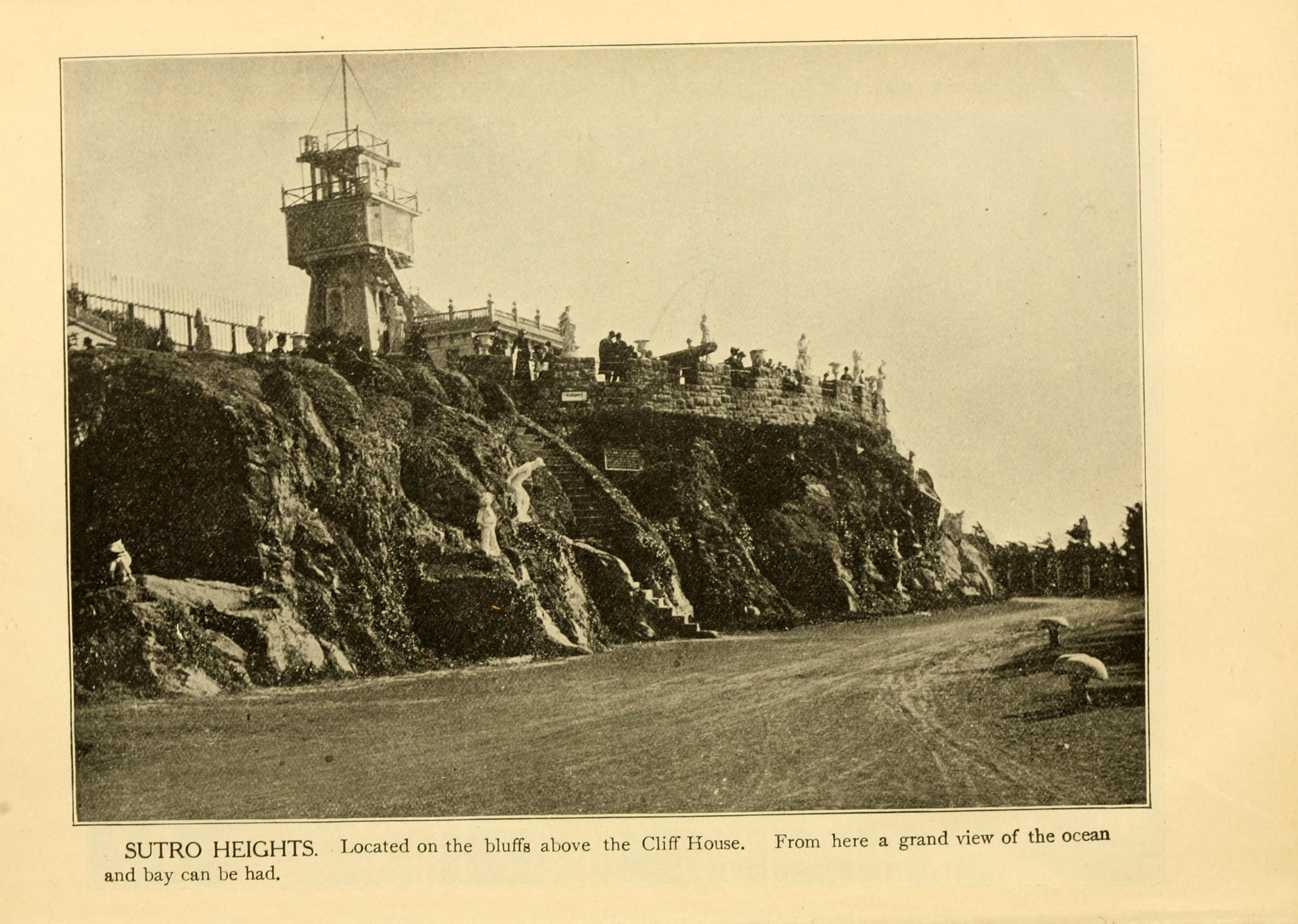
SUTRO HEIGHTS. Located on the bluffs above the Cliff House. From here a grand view of the ocean and bay can be had.

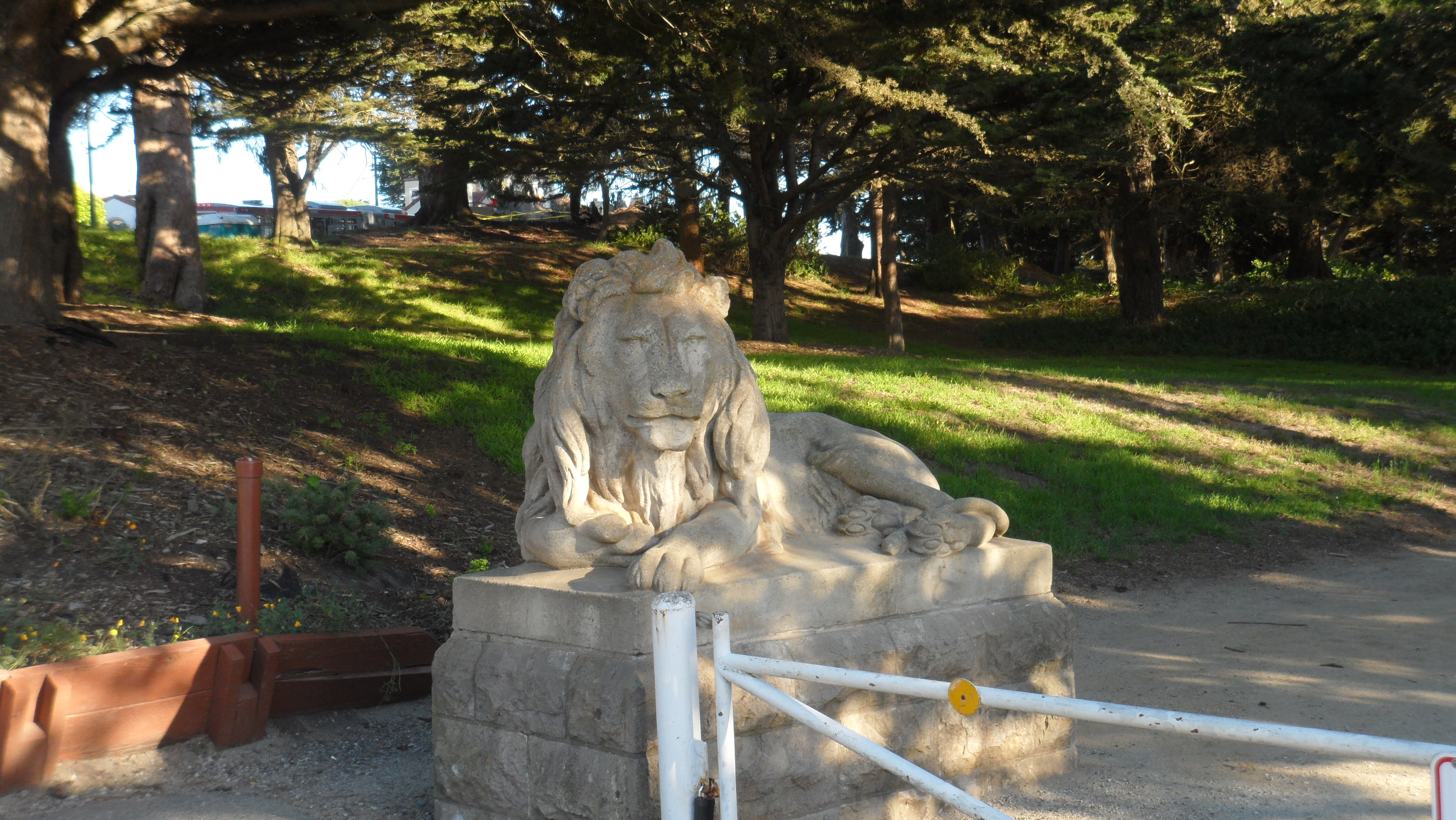

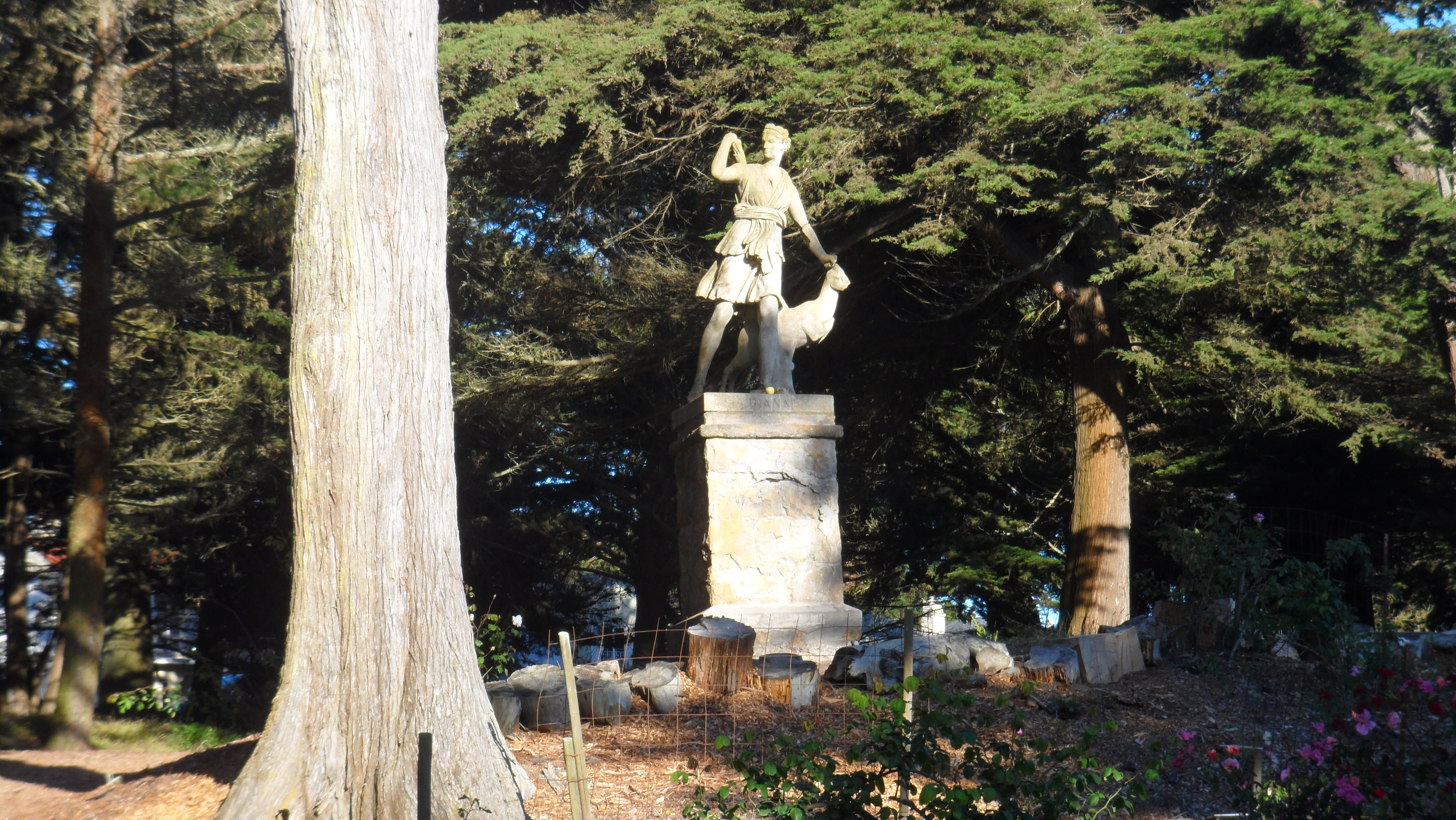

== See also ==
- Cliff House, San Francisco
- Lands End, San Francisco
- Sutro Baths
- 49-Mile Scenic Drive
- Golden Gate National Recreation Area
