= Lurline Baths =

Salt water pool in San Francisco, California

External videos
- Lurline Baths, Thomas A. Edison, Inc., 1897. Available through the National Screening Room at the Library of Congress.

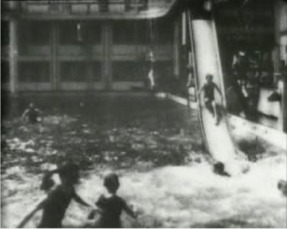
Lurline Baths seen in an 1897 Thomas Edison film

1897 Thomas Edison film featuring the Lurline Baths

The Lurline Baths were public salt water baths built in 1894 in San Francisco, California, at the corner of Bush and Larkin streets. The Lurline Baths closed in 1936. The Lurline Pier, also known as the Olympic Pier, at Ocean Beach between Anza and Balboa Streets was built to protect the intake pipe that provided seawater to the baths. The pier existed until about 1966.

The Olympic Salt Water Company owned the baths, which included a swimming pool and water slide. Founded in 1892, the company also supplied water to the Olympic Club as well as smaller commercial baths. Use of sea water for bathing and in swimming pools was common in the 19th century before pollution became an issue. The company built a water distribution system of the intake pipe located 600 feet offshore, almost 4 miles of iron pipe along present-day Geary Boulevard, a water pump, and the reservoir tank located on Laurel Heights. Gravity brought the water to downtown and the customers.

The baths were immortalized by Thomas Edison in August 1897 when he captured 20 seconds (50 feet) of film featuring scenes from the Lurline pool; the main feature is the water slide with some going down in a sitting position and others lying down, head first or feet first.

== See also ==
- Sutro Baths
