= Lands End (San Francisco) =

Park in San Francisco, U.S.

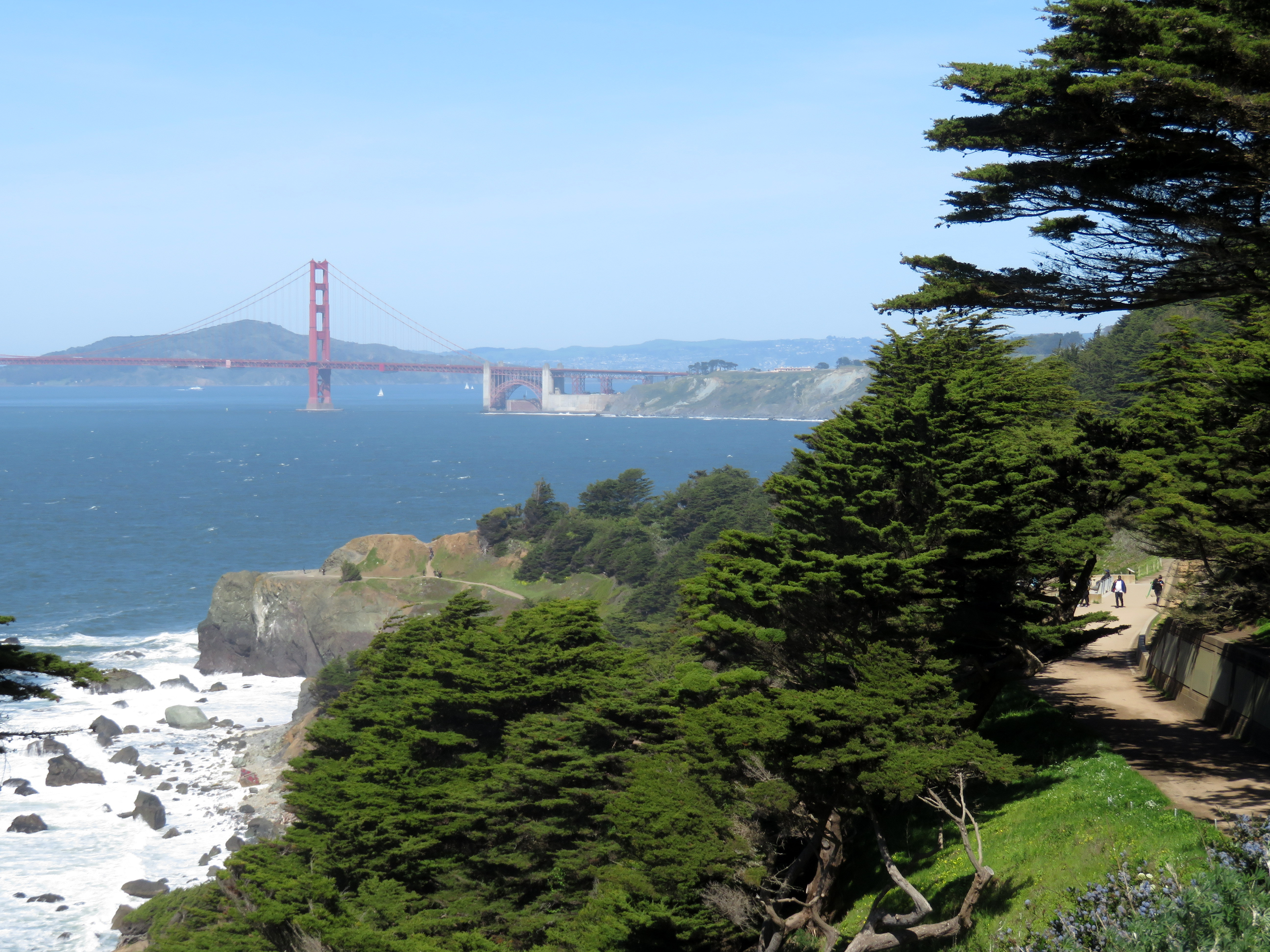
- The Coastal Trail through Lands End, looking north toward the Golden Gate Bridge.

- Location within San Francisco County Location within California Location within the United States
- Location: San Francisco, California, United States
- Coordinates: 37°47′06″N 122°30′20″W
- Operator: Golden Gate National Parks Conservancy
- Website: Official website

Lands End is a park in San Francisco within the larger Golden Gate National Recreation Area. It is also the geographic name of a specific promontory next to the Pacific Ocean on the northwest side of the park. The park is in large part a rocky and windswept shoreline at the mouth of the Golden Gate, situated between the Sutro District and Lincoln Park and abutting Fort Miley Military Reservation. Numerous hiking trails follow the former railbeds of the Ferries and Cliff House Railway along the cliffs and also down to the shore.

== Overview ==
The most-traveled trail in Lands End is the Coastal Trail, a section of the California Coastal Trail that follows the railbed of the old Cliff House Railway. This trail is handicap-accessible until the Mile Rock Overlook, and bike accessible until the Eagles Point steps. A spur trail takes users to Mile Rock Point and Mile Rock Beach, which offer views of the Golden Gate.

The San Francisco Crosstown Trail terminates at Lands End.

A memorial to USS San Francisco stands in the park, at the southern end of the park's section of the Coastal Trail. Additionally, Lands End contains the ruins of the Sutro Baths. Other historic sites include numerous shipwrecks, which are visible at low tides from the Coastal Trail and Mile Rock. A visitor center, Lands End Lookout, opened on April 28, 2012.

== History ==
The Yelamu Ohlone tribe lived at Lands End before Spanish settlement began in 1776. After the California gold rush, entrepreneurs designed the new Cliff House as a fashionable resort for the wealthy. A private company constructed a new road called Point Lobos Avenue. By the 1860s, a horse-drawn stagecoach made the trip every Sunday from crowded downtown San Francisco out to Lands End. During the 1880s, millionaire Adolph Sutro constructed a passenger steam train from downtown to Lands End for the affordable fare of 5¢. In 1891, an old miner called Charles Jackson announced that he had discovered a vein of bituminous coal under the cliffs at Dead Man’s Point, on Sutro's land; Sutro had a tunnel dug 200 feet under the railroad track and confirmed the find, but the mine was never exploited.

== Geography ==
The Lands End unit of Golden Gate National Recreation Area (GGNRA) is adjacent to Lincoln Park, a San Francisco city park that includes a city-owned golf course and the Legion of Honor Museum, as well as the Fort Miley Military Reservation, which largely consists of the San Francisco VA Medical Center. The GGNRA land largely surrounds Lincoln Park and Fort Miley, to the north and west of these areas. The Lands End GGNRA unit largely consists of scenic cliffside areas overlooking the Pacific Ocean, and is centered on the Coastal Trail and several branch trails. The section of the Coastal Trail in Lands End leads from the northern terminus of 32nd Avenue in the wealthy Sea Cliff neighborhood, past the high headland that includes Lincoln Park, and then following the coastal headlands downhill to the west and south, to Point Lobos Avenue, where the park then adjoins Sutro Heights Park and the Cliff House.

The coastline of the Lands End area includes several promontories that have historically been of importance in navigation in the approach to the Golden Gate. One such point is Lands End, which gives its name to the larger area. Lands End point is northeast of the Legion of Honor and south of the offshore Mile Rock, which in turn gives its name to Mile Rock Beach, which is in a cove adjacent to Lands End. This area can be reached by the Lands End Trail, which branches off from the Coastal Trail. The point was the site of the Lands End Labyrinth. Dead Man's Point and Eagle's Point are two smaller promontories on the park's coastline to the east of Lands End.

Another important promontory is Point Lobos (not to be confused with Point Lobos in Monterey County), on the far west side of the park, immediately above the ruins of the Sutro Baths. It can be reached by the Sutro Bath trail and includes a scenic overlook. Several tunnels that used to deliver sea water to the Sutro Baths are cut through the headland that makes up Point Lobos. Point Lobos is also sometimes called "Parallel Point", after a schooner named the Parallel that was shipwrecked there in 1887.

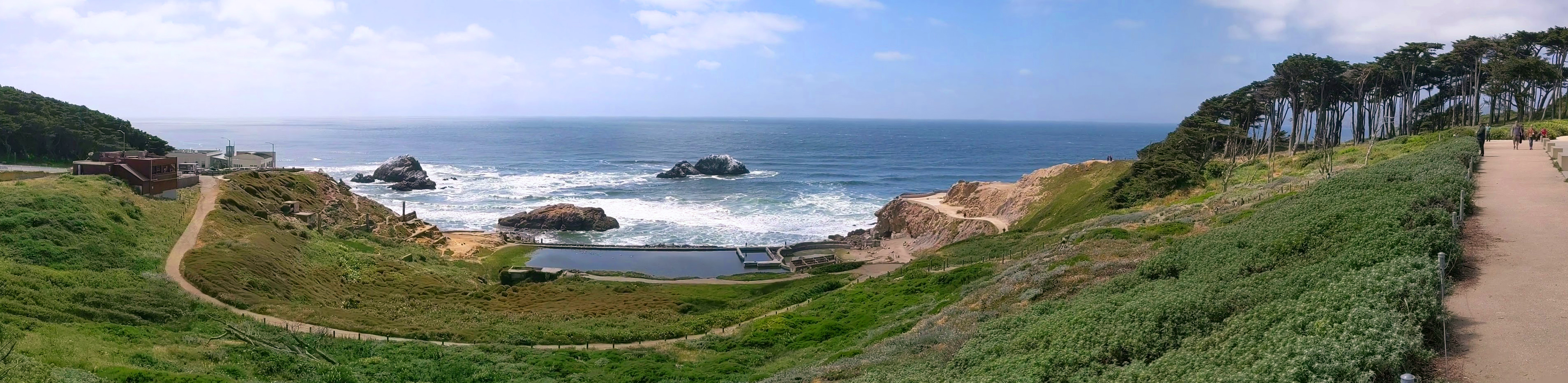
View from Lands End Lookout

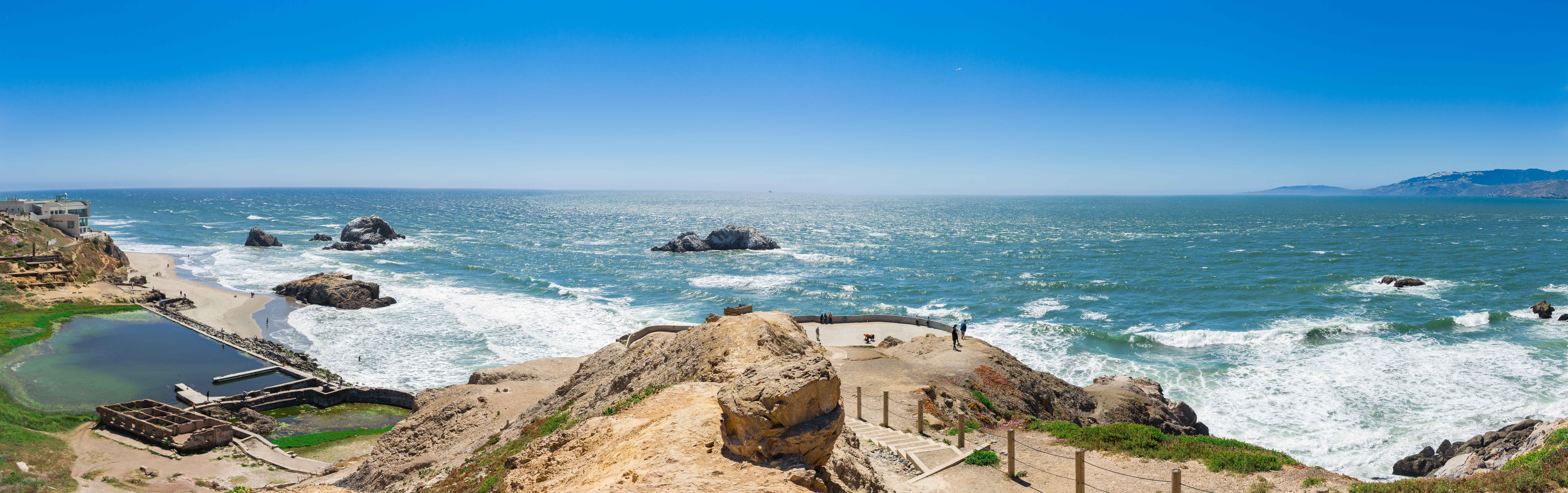
View from an outcropping at Point Lobos

== Geology ==
The sea cliffs of Lands End are clastic rocks ranging from 100-200 feet high. Carved out of bedrock, the sea cliffs are made from Franciscan Complex [formerly known as Franciscan formation] with graywacke sandstone and shale.

There are three terranes that meet along the Lands End coast. To the west is the San Bruno Mountain terrane at Point Lobos, in the middle, is the melange, to the east, along the coast at Lincoln Park is the Marin Headlands terrane.

The cliffs are constantly under pressure to collapse as they are prone to landslides happening from serpentine and sheared rocks. Other factors that have contributed to landslides in the area are uneven surfaces, swelling clay, extensive rainfall, earthquakes, and human disturbances. Erosion has also impacted the landscape as it ended the #1 California streetcar line running through Lands End, alongside the Lands End Station and the El Camino del Mar. The Sutro Baths and Sutro Heights continue to erode by smaller landslides and erosion.

== Climate and vegetation ==
The climate consists of rainfall during the winter months of November through March, while summer climate often has droughts. Fog is also common from late afternoon through the night in the summer, which is influenced by the pressure from the cold California Current and Pacific Ocean.

The fog and wind from the Pacific Ocean also contribute to key characteristics of the common native plants, which are salt-tolerant and low. These plants include the toyon, Douglas iris, seaside daisy, silver bush lupine, and San Francisco wallflower 5. Additionally, the Northern coastal scrubs are dominated by coyote bush with fog and salt making these coastal sites more diverse.

Up until the 1930s, before the planting of pine, eucalyptus, and cypress, the headlands lacked trees besides willows. Over time, they began crowding the existing native plants, and the NPS called for restoration efforts to thin down the tree strands for meadow areas and adding native plants back in.

== Labyrinth ==
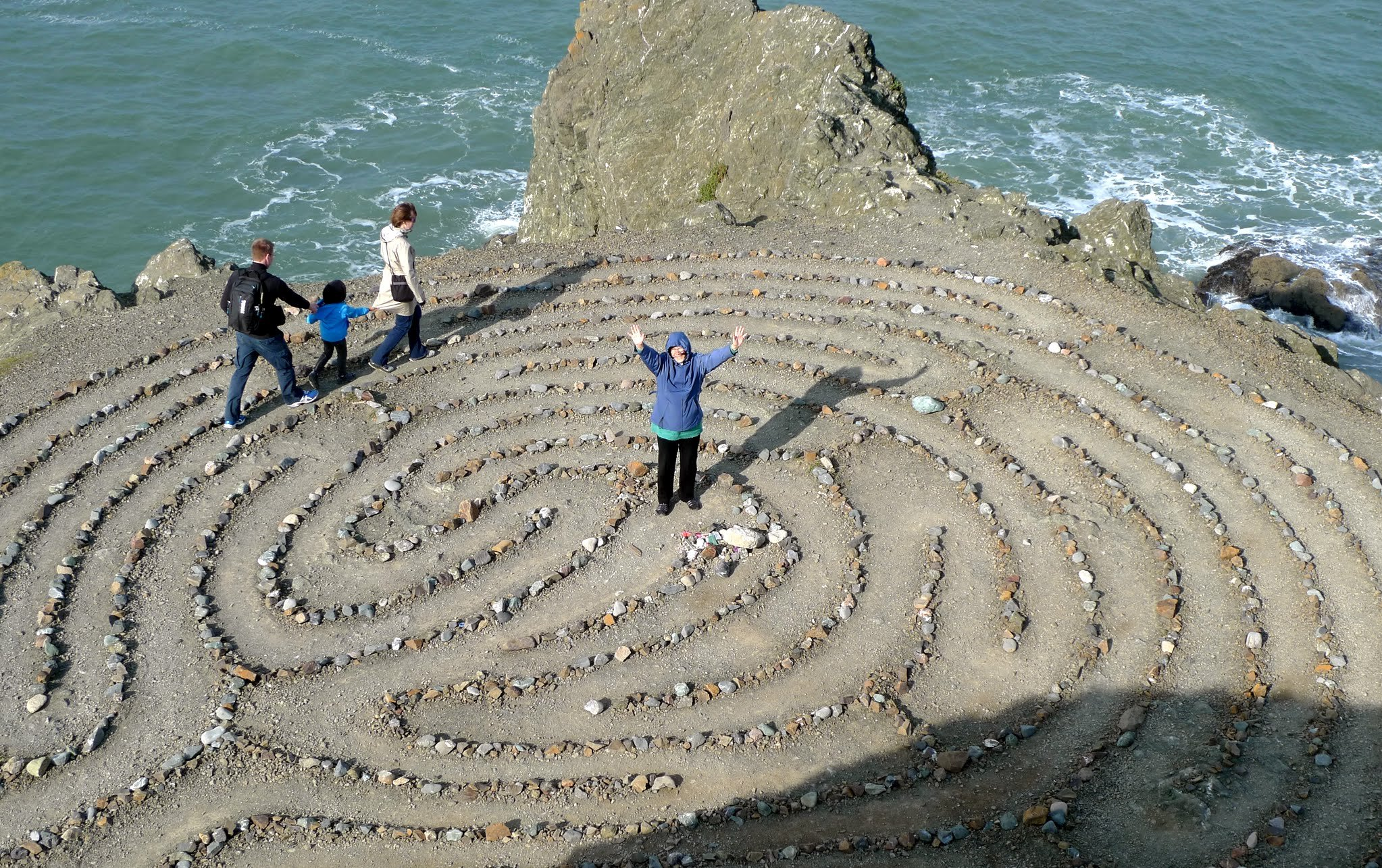
The Hidden Labyrinth at Lands End, 2011

Along the Coastal Trail at Lands End, local artist Eduardo Aguilera constructed a "hidden labyrinth" overlooking Golden Gate Bridge in 2004. It has been vandalized numerous times and was destroyed in August 2015, but was rebuilt a month later by the artist with the help of 50 volunteers. As of 2021, the labyrinth ceased to exist.

== See also ==
- List of beaches in California
- List of California state parks
