= Wave motor =

Wave motors were machines designed and built in the late 19th and early 20th century to harness the power of wave or tidal energy. Many experiments were planned or built in California employing various methods. The earliest wave motors were not intended for the creation of electricity. Prior to 1880, wave motors were designed to operate non-electrically to power vehicles or mills.
