= Sutro =

Sutro is a surname. Notable people with the surname include:

- Abraham Sutro (1784–1869), German rabbi in Gelsenkirchen
- Adolph Sutro (1830–1898), Mayor of San Francisco
- Florence Sutro (1865–1906), musician and painter, sister-in-law of Adolph and Otto Sutro
- Otto Sutro (1833–1896), Adolph's brother, a musician of Baltimore
- Alfred Sutro (1863–1933), British playwright
- Rose and Ottilie Sutro (1870–1957 and 1872–1970), daughters of Otto, one of the first piano duo teams
- John Sutro (1903–1985), British film producer
- John Sutro (American football) (born 1940)

== See also ==
- Sutro, Nevada
- Sutro Tunnel in Nevada
- Sutro District in San Francisco, containing:
  - Sutro Baths
  - Sutro Heights Park
- Mount Sutro in San Francisco
  - Sutro Tower on Mount Sutro
- Sutro Library, San Francisco branch of the California State Library
- Sutro's gum tree ranch in San Francisco's Glen Canyon Park
