= Sutro, Nevada =

- Ghost town
- Location within the state of Nevada Sutro, Nevada (the United States)
- Coordinates: 39°16′48″N 119°35′03″W
- Country: United States
- State: Nevada
- County: Lyon
- Elevation: 4,478 ft (1,365 m)
- Time zone: UTC-8 (Pacific (PST))
  - Summer (DST): UTC-7 (PDT)
- GNIS feature ID: 856145

Sutro, Nevada is a ghost town in Lyon County, Nevada, near where the Sutro Tunnel is located.

== History ==
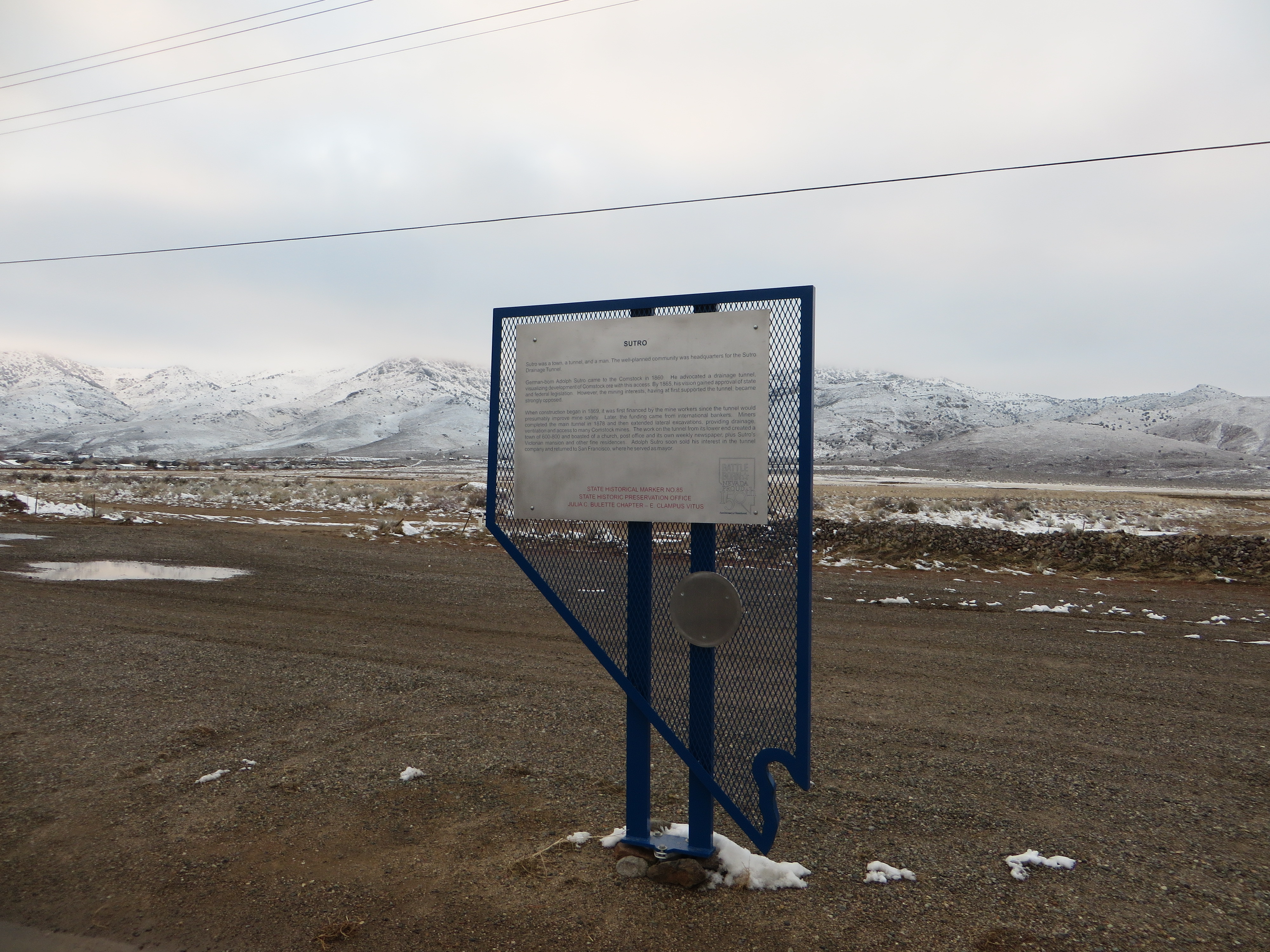
Historical marker in Sutro

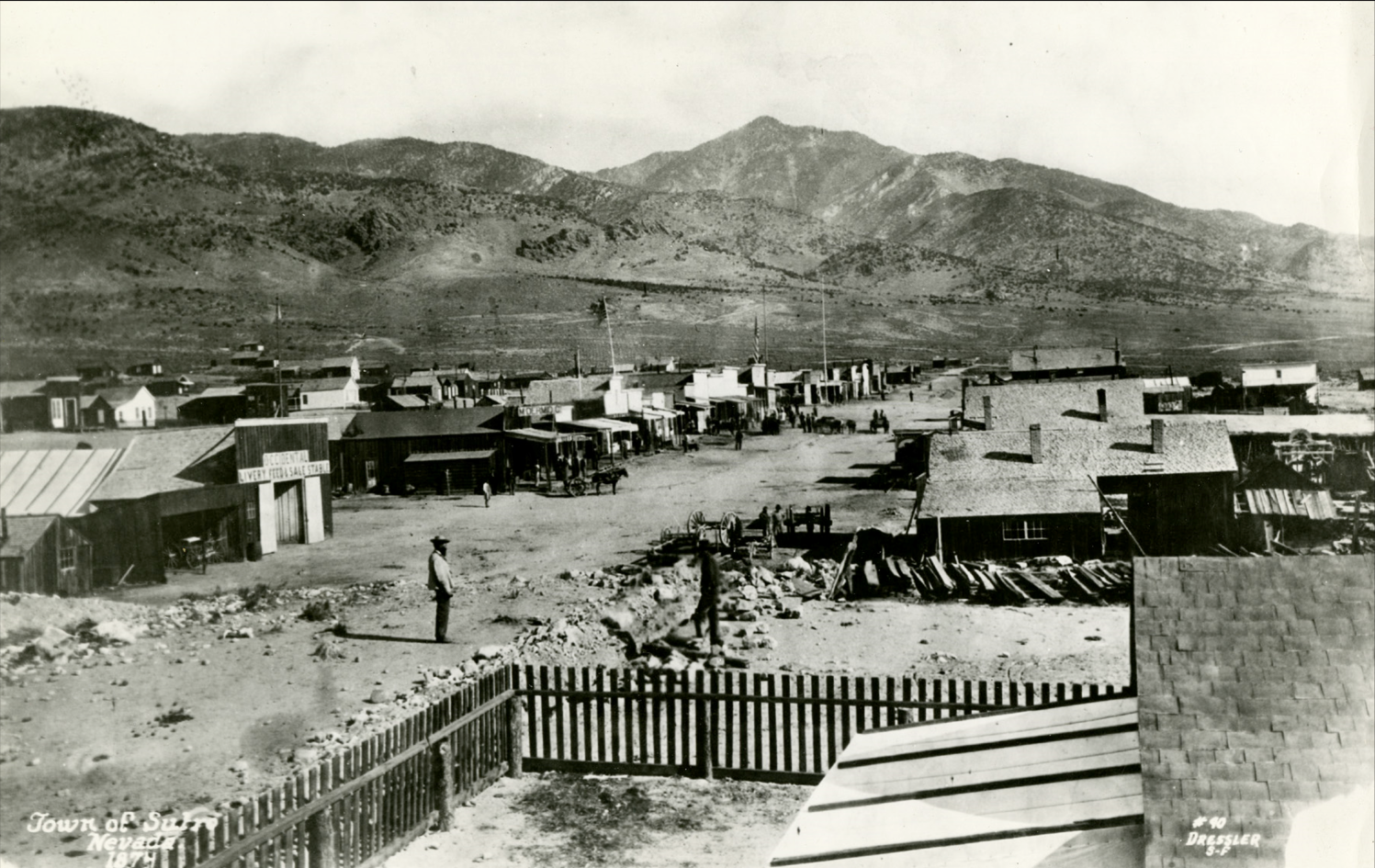
The town of Sutro Nevada, taken in 1874

Sutro was founded by Adolph Sutro, an immigrant of Prussia, Germany. He came to the United States in 1850, and while in San Francisco he heard news about a gold rush in Washoe County. He left San Francisco to explore the region around the Comstock Lode, building a number of mills and ovens to recover the gold and silver from the ore. In 1860, he had a dream to build a massive tunnel to expand drainage and airflow to the Comstock Lode. After a fire on April 7, 1869, killed 45 miners due to suffocation, construction began on October 19, 1869, and the main tunnel was completed in 1878.

During construction, the company town of Sutro was created at the lower end of the tunnel. At one time, boasting a population of 600-800 people, a church, a weekly newspaper, and a post office that was in operation from March 1872 until October 1920.

It is Nevada Historical Marker number 85.

The "Friends of Sutro Tunnel" are working to preserve this significant part of Nevada's mining history by restoring the Sutro Tunnel Site. The goal of the project is to not only preserve the site's historical integrity, but to also make it safe and accessible for visitors. Phase One of the project is currently underway with the focus being on ongoing site cleanup and protecting remaining structures from further deterioration.
