= Alexander Hamilton Handy =

American judge (1809–1883)

Alexander Hamilton Handy (December 25, 1809 – September 12, 1883) was a Mississippi attorney who served on the Mississippi Supreme Court from 1853 to 1867, sitting as Chief Justice of Mississippi from 1864 to 1867.

== Biography ==
Handy was born in Somerset County, Maryland on December 25, 1809, the son of Betsey (née Wilson) and George Handy. He studied at the Washington Academy and was admitted to the bar in 1834. After marrying, he moved to Mississippi with his family, in 1836. In 1853, he was elected as an associate justice on the High Court of Errors and Appeals and was reelected in 1860, and again in 1865. on April 18, 1864, he was made Chief Justice, where he served until October 1, 1867. He resigned his office due to the Reconstruction-era subjection of the court to military power by the Federal government. Thereafter, he returned to Baltimore, Maryland where he practiced law and taught at the University of Maryland Law School. In 1871, he moved back to Canton, Mississippi where he died on September 12, 1883.

Handy was a secessionist, opining of the "black" Republican Party that:

The first act of the black republican party will be to exclude slavery from all the territories, from the District of Columbia, the arsenals and the forts, by the action of the general government. That would be a recognition that slavery is a sin, and confine the institution to its present limits. The moment that slavery is pronounced a moral evil, a sin, by the general government, that moment the safety of the rights of the south will be entirely gone.

— Judge Alexander Hamilton Handy, February 1861.

== Personal life ==
In 1835, he married Susan Wilson Stuart. His daughter Arianna Handy married German-Jewish immigrant musician and conductor Otto Sutro (also brother of San Francisco mayor Adolph Sutro). His granddaughters were the piano duettists Rose and Ottilie Sutro.

Political offices
Preceded by William Yerger	Justice of the Supreme Court of Mississippi; 1853–1867	Succeeded by Court abolished
