= Violin Concerto No. 1 (Bruch) =

Violin concerto by Max Bruch

Violin Concerto
- No. 1
- by Max Bruch
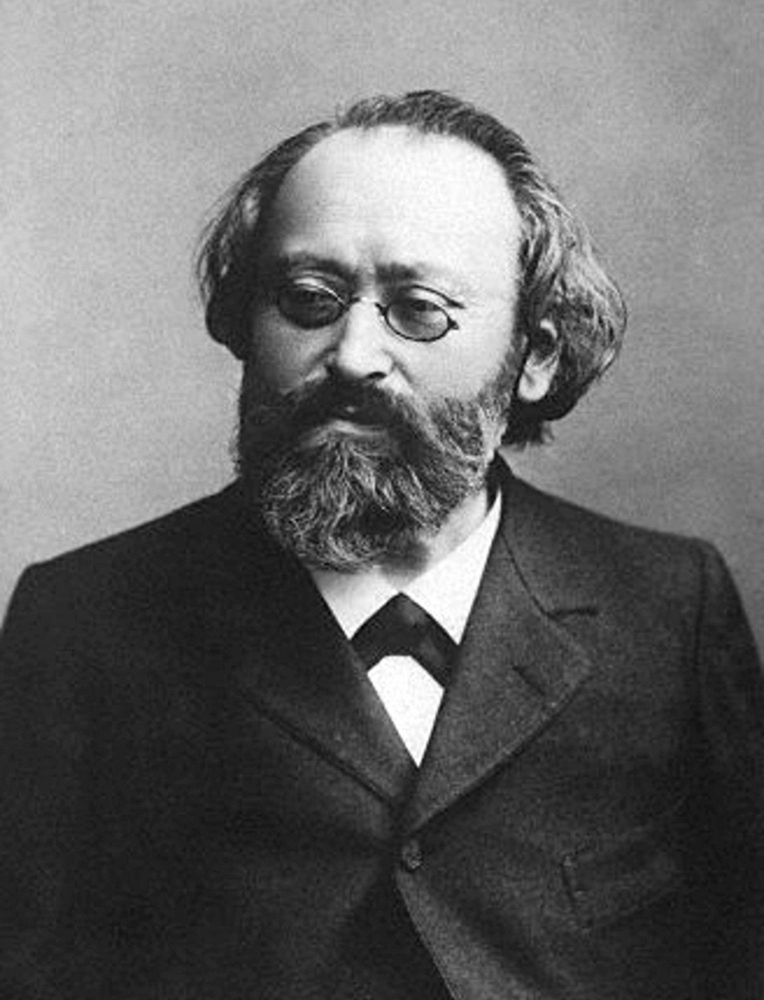
- Key: G minor
- Opus: 26
- Period: Romantic
- Genre: Concerto
- Composed: 1866
- Movements: 3
- Scoring: Violin and Orchestra

Premiere
- Date: April 24, 1866

Max Bruch's Violin Concerto No. 1 in G minor, Op. 26, is one of the most popular violin concertos in solo violin repertoire and, along with the Scottish Fantasy, the composer's most famous work. It is considered the richest and most seductive out of the four great German violin concertos: Beethoven, Brahms, Bruch, and Mendelssohn. It has been recorded often.

== History ==
The concerto was first completed in 1866 and the first performance was given on 24 April 1866 by Otto von Königslow, with Bruch conducting. The concerto was then considerably revised with help from celebrated violinist Joseph Joachim and completed in its present form in 1867. The premiere of the revised concerto was given by Joachim in Bremen on 7 January 1868, with Karl Martin Rheinthaler conducting.

=== Fate of the score ===
Bruch sold the score to the publisher N. Simrock outright for a small lump sum — but he kept a copy of his own. At the end of World War I, he was destitute, having been unable to enforce the payment of royalties for his other works because of chaotic world-wide economic conditions. He sent his autograph to the duo-pianists Rose and Ottilie Sutro (for whom he had written his Concerto for Two Pianos and Orchestra, Op. 88a, in 1912), so that they could sell it in the United States and send him the money. Bruch died in October 1920, without ever receiving any money.

The Sutro sisters decided to keep the score themselves, but they claimed to have sold it and sent Bruch's family some worthless German paper money as the alleged proceeds of the alleged sale. They always refused to divulge any details of the supposed purchaser. In 1949, they sold the autograph to Mary Flagler Cary, whose collection, including the Bruch concerto, now resides at the Pierpont Morgan Public Library in New York City.

== Music ==
External audio
- Performed by Itzhak Perlman with the Concertgebouw Orchestra under Bernard Haitink
- I. Vorspiel (Allegro moderato)
- II. Adagio
- III. Finale (Allegro energico)

The work is scored for solo violin and a standard classical orchestra consisting of two flutes, two oboes, two clarinets, two bassoons, four horns, two trumpets, timpani, and strings.

The concerto is in three movements:

1. Vorspiel: Allegro moderato (in G minor)
2. Adagio (in E♭ major)
3. Finale: Allegro energico (in G major)

=== I. Vorspiel: Allegro moderato ===
The first movement is unusual in that it is a Vorspiel, a prelude, to the second movement and is directly linked to it. The piece starts off slowly, with the melody first taken by the flutes, and then the solo violin becomes audible with a short cadenza. This repeats again, serving as an introduction to the main portion of the movement, which contains a strong first theme and a very melodic, and generally slower, second theme. The movement ends as it began, with the two short cadenzas more virtuosic than before, and the orchestra's final tutti flows into the second movement, connected by a single low note from the first violins.

=== II. Adagio ===
The second movement is a slow movement that is often admired for its melody. It is generally considered to be the heart of the concerto. The themes, presented by the violin, are underscored by a constantly moving orchestra part, keeping the movement alive and helping it flow from one part to the next.

=== III. Finale: Allegro energico ===
The third movement, the finale, opens with an intense, yet quiet, orchestral introduction that yields to the soloist's statement of the energetic theme in brilliant double stops. It is very much like a dance that moves at a comfortably fast and energetic tempo. The second subject is a fine example of Romantic lyricism, a slower melody which cuts into the movement several times, before the dance theme returns with its fireworks. The piece ends with a Presto con fuoco section (literally meaning fast, and on fire), leading to a fiery finish that gets higher as it gets faster and louder and eventually concludes with two short, yet grand, chords.

== Lasting popularity ==
Bruch also composed two more violin concertos, but neither has gained as much fame as his first, which continues to be very popular in both repertoire and audience terms. This was a source of great frustration for Bruch, who wrote to Simrock:

Nothing compares to the laziness, stupidity and dullness of many German violinists. Every fortnight another one comes to me wanting to play the first concerto. I have now become rude; and have told them: 'I cannot listen to this concerto any more – did I perhaps write just this one? Go away and once and for all play the other concertos, which are just as good, if not better.'

In 1903 Bruch visited Naples, and local violinists gathered near where he was staying to salute him. Bruch complained:

On the corner of the Via Toledo they stand there, ready to break out with my first violin concerto as soon as I allow myself to be seen. (They can all go to the devil! As if I had not written other equally good concertos!)

In 1996, it was voted the number one work in the Classic FM Hall of Fame by the station's listeners. In its profile of Bruch, Classic FM described the violin concerto as "one of the best works of the Romantic period".

In October 2019, the concerto was the subject of BBC Radio 4's Tales from the Stave with Joshua Bell seeing the original manuscript for the first time.
