= Fannie Morris Spencer =

American composer and organist

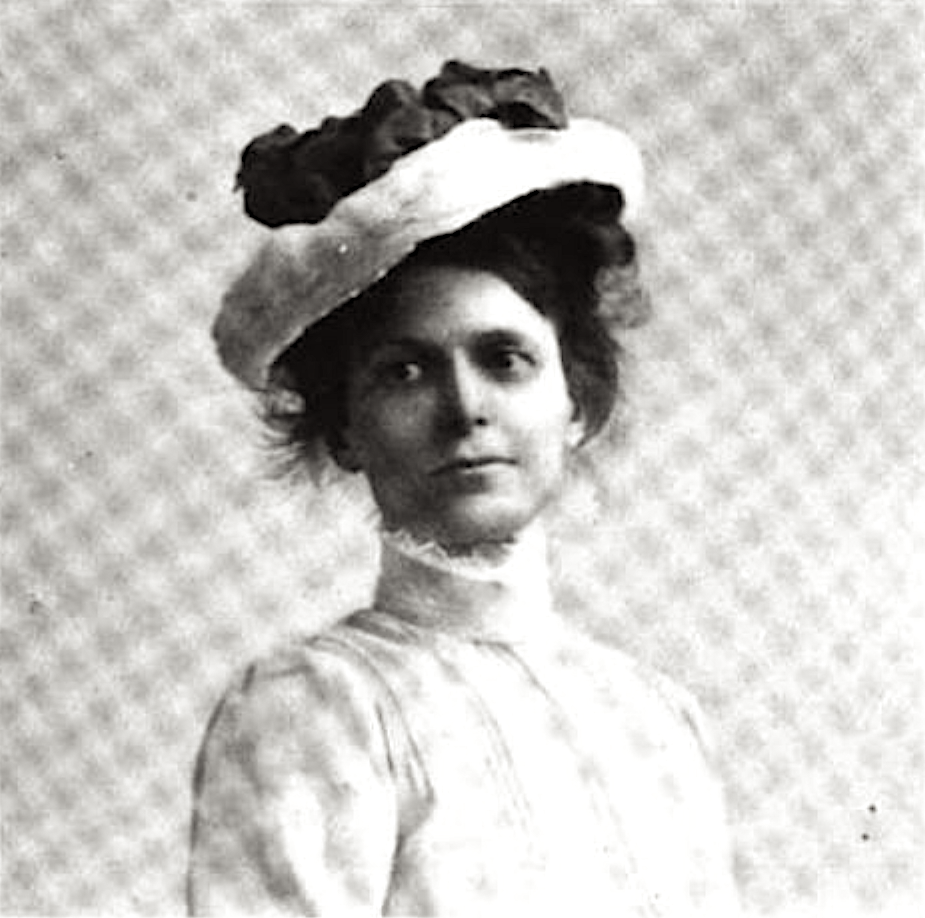
Spencer in a 1908 publication.

Fannie Morris Spencer (August 15, 1865 – April 9, 1943) was an American composer and organist who wrote a collection of 32 hymns and was a founding member of the American Guild of Organists.

Spencer was born in Newburgh, New York, to Cynthia McCollum and Timothy W. Spencer. She studied music in New York City with Alexander Lambert and Samuel P. Warren, then taught and worked as a church organist. She taught at the Dr. Holbrook’s Military School and Miss Fuller’s School for Girls in Ossining, and at Miss Spence’s School for Girls (today the Spence School) in New York City. She was an organist at Fourth Presbyterian Church, Lexington Avenue Baptist Church, and Pilgrim Congregational Church, all in New York City.

Spencer chaired the music committee of the Professional Women’s League and served as vice president of the New York State Music Teachers Association, where she worked with Florence Sutro. She also chaired the music committee of the 1895 Cotton States and International Exposition in Atlanta. In 1896, Spencer was one of 145 organists (and only four women) to found the American Guild of Organists. She gave organ recitals at churches throughout America, including two recitals at the 1901 Pan American Exposition.

Spencer’s music was published by Oliver Ditson, G. Schirmer Inc., James Hotchkiss Rogers, Novello & Co. (today the Wise Music Group), Ewer & Co., and Phelps Music Co. Her compositions included:

== Organ ==
- 32 Hymn Tunes (collection)
- Magnificat in C
- Magnificat in G

== Vocal ==
- “As Pants the Hart”
- “Awake My Love”
- “Bethlehem”
- “Homeward”
- “Lord’s Prayer”
- “O Lord, Rebuke Me Not”
- “Unless”
- “Well-a-Day”
- “When I Know”
