= Otto Sutro =

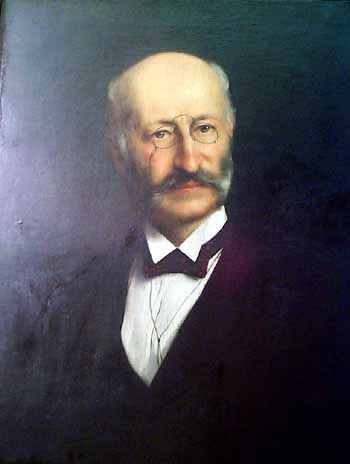
- Otto Sutro
- Born: 1833; Aachen, Germany
- Died: January 19, 1896 (age 63)
- Occupation: Musician
- Spouse: Arianna Handy
- Children: Rose and Ottilie Sutro
- Family: Adolph Sutro (brother); Alexander Hamilton Handy (father-in-law); Florence Sutro (sister-in-law)

Otto Sutro (1833 – January 19, 1896) was a German-born American organist, conductor, minor composer, publisher and music store owner, and a leading figure in the musical life of Baltimore, Maryland.

== Biography ==
Sutro was born to a Jewish family in Aachen, Germany. He has six brothers and three sisters. His brother Adolph Sutro became the first Jewish Mayor of San Francisco and built the Sutro Baths. His brother Theodore Sutro, husband of Florence Sutro, was seminal in the building and financing the Sutro Tunnel first proposed by his brother Adolph. He studied the organ with Nicolas Lemmens in Brussels and moved to the United States in 1851, undertaking further studies at the Peabody Institute. He hosted a musical appreciation society known as the Wednesday Club. With fellow alum Fritz Finke, Sutro helped found the Oratorio Society of Baltimore, and became its main conductor.

== Personal life ==
He married Arianna Handy, a pianist, singer, and daughter of a former chief justice of Mississippi, Alexander Hamilton Handy. They had two daughters, Rose and Ottilie Sutro, who were the first recognised piano-duo team. Sutro sat for portrait artist David Dalhoff Neal in 1889 (see image). Rapheal Tuck & Son created a litho art card Character Otto Sutro.
