= Max Bruch =

German composer (1838–1920)

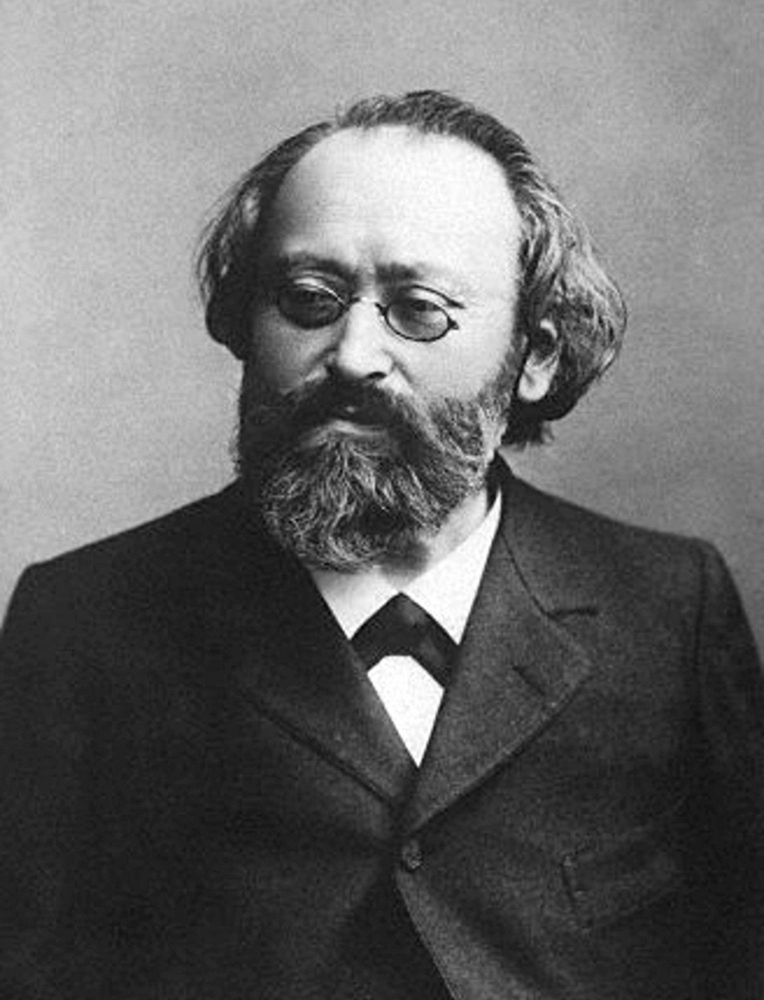
- Born: 6 January 1838; Cologne, Prussia
- Died: 2 October 1920 (aged 82); Berlin-Friedenau, Germany
- Era: Late Romantic
- Works: List of compositions
- Spouse: Clara Tuczek (m. 1881; died 1919)

Signature
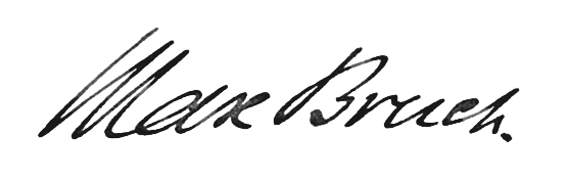

Max Bruch (Note: In the literature his full name appears either as Max Christian Friedrich Bruch or Max Karl August Bruch) (6 January 1838 – 2 October 1920) was a German Romantic composer, violinist, teacher, and conductor who wrote more than 200 works, including three violin concertos, the first of which has become a staple of the violin repertoire.

== Early life and education ==
Max Bruch was born in 1838 in Cologne to Wilhelmine (née Almenräder), a singer, and August Carl Friedrich Bruch, an attorney who became vice president of the Cologne police. Max had a sister, Mathilde ("Till"). He received his early musical training under the composer and pianist Ferdinand Hiller, to whom Robert Schumann dedicated his Piano Concerto in A minor. The Bohemian composer and piano virtuoso Ignaz Moscheles recognized Bruch's aptitude.

At the age of nine, Bruch wrote his first composition, a song for his mother's birthday. From then on, music was his passion. His studies were enthusiastically supported by his parents. His many early works included motets, psalm settings, piano pieces, violin sonatas, a string quartet, and even orchestral works such as the prelude to a planned opera, Joan of Arc. Few of these early works have survived.

Bruch's first music theory lesson was in 1849 in Bonn. It was given by Professor Heinrich Carl Breidenstein, a friend of his father's. At this time, Bruch was staying at an estate in Bergisch Gladbach, where he wrote much of his music. The farm belonged to an attorney and notary named Neissen, who lived there with his unmarried sister. Later, the estate was bought by the Zanders family, who owned a large paper mill. In later years, Maria Zanders became a friend and patron to Bruch.

The young Bruch was taught French and English conversation by his father, who was very wealthy.

== Career ==
After briefly studying philosophy and art in Bonn (1859), Bruch had a long career as a teacher, conductor, and composer, moving among musical posts in Germany: Mannheim (1862–1864), Koblenz (1865–1867), Sondershausen (1867–1870), Berlin (1870–1872), and Bonn, where he spent 1873–78 working privately. At the height of his career he spent three seasons as conductor of the Liverpool Philharmonic Society (1880–83).

He taught composition at the Berlin Hochschule für Musik from 1890 until his retirement in 1910. His notable students included the Italian composer Ottorino Respighi, English composer Ralph Vaughan Williams, American pianist Rudolph Reuter, and the German pianist, composer, and writer Clara Mathilda Faisst (1872–1948). See: List of music students by teacher: A to B#Max Bruch.

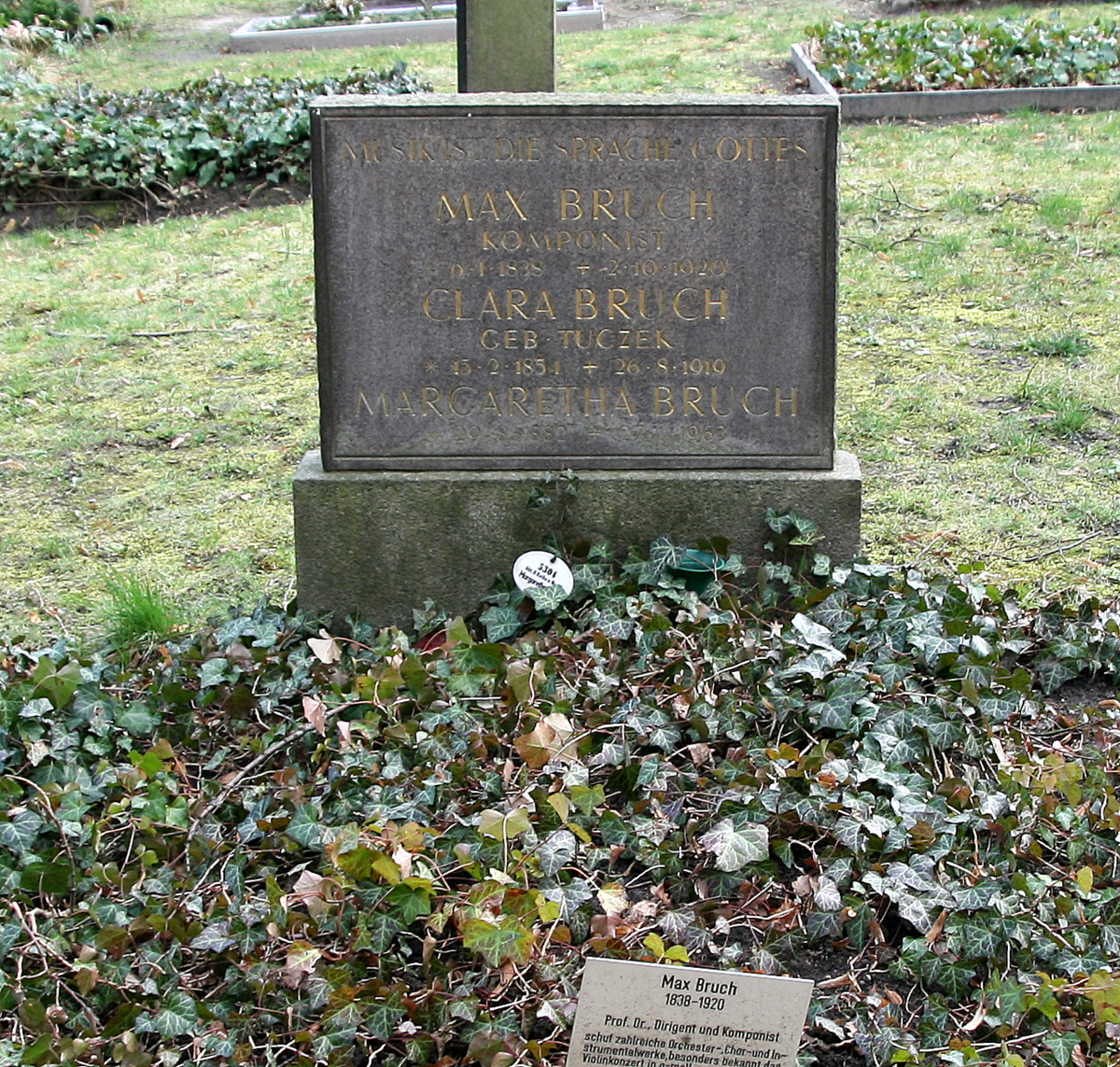
Bruch's grave, at the Old St. Matthäus churchyard at Berlin-Schöneberg

== Personal life and final years ==
Bruch married Clara Tuczek, a singer whom he had met on tour in Berlin, on 3 January 1881. She is believed to have been born on 15 February 1854 and thus 26 at the time of the marriage; some sources suggest she was 16. She belonged to a musical family; her sister was composer Felicia Tuczek. The couple returned to Liverpool where Bruch was conductor of the Liverpool Philharmonic Society (1880–83) and took lodgings in the Sefton Park area. Their daughter, Margaretha, who later became a noted author and champion of her father's life and works, was born in Liverpool in 1882. Their first son, Max Felix Bruch, was born on 31 May 1884 in Breslau and showed great aptitude for music at an early age. They had two further sons, Hans and Ewald. Of the four children, only Max Jr. and Ewald married, but neither had children of their own, and so Bruch's direct family line ended with Ewald's death in 1974.

== Death ==
Bruch died in his home in Berlin-Friedenau in 1920. He was buried next to his wife Clara, who had died on 26 August 1919, at the Old St. Matthäus churchyard at Berlin-Schöneberg. Margaretha Bruch later had carved on the gravestone, "Music is the language of God."

== Works ==
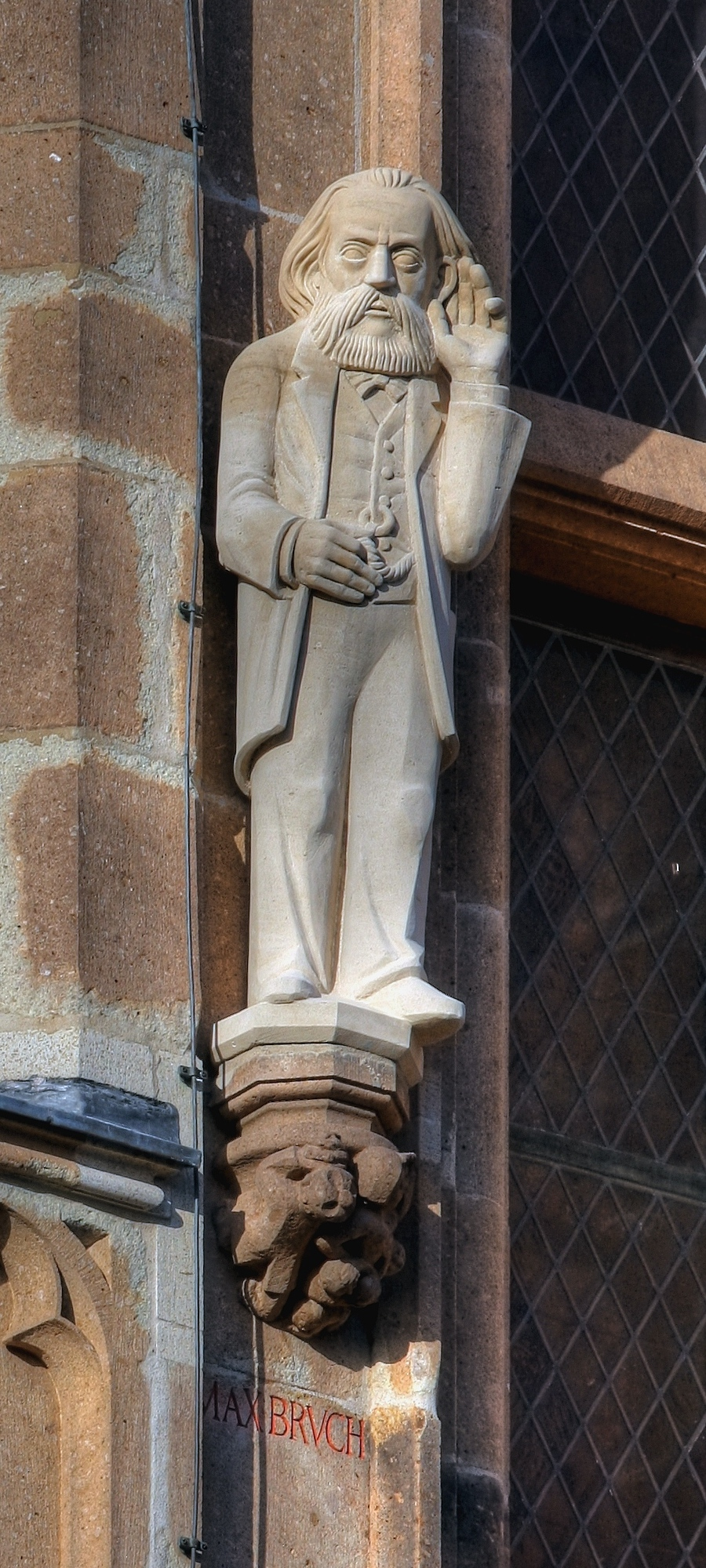
Sculpture of Bruch on the restored tower of the Cologne City Hall

Bruch's complex and well-structured works in the German Romantic musical tradition placed him in the camp of Romantic classicism exemplified by Johannes Brahms, rather than the opposing "New Music" of Franz Liszt and Richard Wagner. In his time, Bruch was known primarily as a choral composer and, to his chagrin, was often overshadowed by his friend Brahms, who was more popular and widely regarded.

Today, as it was during his life, Bruch's Violin Concerto No. 1, in G minor, Op. 26 (1866) is one of the most popular Romantic violin concertos. It uses several techniques from Felix Mendelssohn's Violin Concerto in E minor, including the linking of movements, as well as omitting the Classical opening orchestral exposition and other conservative formal structural devices of earlier concertos. Joseph Joachim was the main person he referred to while composing and developing his concerto, and it was Joachim's revisions that made it to the final, published version of the piece. Despite these modifications to the conventional Romantic style, Bruch often was considered a conservative composer.

The two other works of Bruch that still are widely played, also were written for solo string instrument with orchestra: the Scottish Fantasy for violin and orchestra, which includes an arrangement of the tune "Hey Tuttie Tatie", best known for its use in the song "Scots Wha Hae" by Robert Burns; and the Kol Nidrei, Op. 47, for cello and orchestra (subtitled "Adagio on Hebrew Melodies for Violoncello and Orchestra"), which begins and ends with the solo cello's setting of the Kol Nidre ("All Vows ... ") incantation that opens the Jewish (Ashkenazic) Yom Kippur service. This work may well have inspired Ernest Bloch's Schelomo (subtitled "Hebrew Rhapsody") of 1916, an even more passionate and extended one-movement composition, also with a Jewish subject and also for solo cello and orchestra.

The success of Kol Nidrei led to an assumption by many that Bruch was of Jewish ancestry, although Bruch himself denied this and there is no evidence that he was Jewish. As far as can be ascertained, none of his ancestors were Jews. Bruch was given the middle name Christian and was raised Protestant. On one occasion he was even recorded making an antisemitic comment in the wake of Germany's defeat in World War I. Ironically, despite repeated denials by Bruch's surviving family, so long as the Nazi Party was in power (1933–1945), performance of his music was restricted because he was considered a "possible Jew" for having written music with an openly Jewish theme. As a result, his music was largely forgotten in German-speaking countries.

In the realm of chamber music, Bruch is not well known, although his "Eight Pieces for Clarinet, Viola, and Piano" are occasionally revived, there being very little other music written for this rare combination of instruments. As with Brahms and Weber who produced clarinet compositions with a particular clarinetist in mind, so did Bruch write these trios for a particular clarinettist, his own son Max. He also wrote many other pieces in the chamber music tradition, including his septet, which is noteworthy. His first major chamber pieces, composed at the start of his career, are two string quartets that are similar in tone and intensity to Schumann's string quartets (Op. 41). The composition of his second piano quintet is intriguing, as he began the composition while conductor of the Liverpool Philharmonic Society. Although written for amateurs, it is a fair composition and was completed only after Bruch, having left Liverpool, was gently persuaded to finish the last movement.

Sir Donald Tovey wrote "I find myself entirely in agreement with the writer of the article in Grove's Dictionary who says that Bruch's greatest mastery lies in the treatment of chorus and orchestra." Tovey went on to praise in particular Odysseus: Szenen aus der Odyssee (Odysseus: Scenes from The Odyssey), op. 41, for chorus, soloists and orchestra, and a Kyrie and Sanctus.

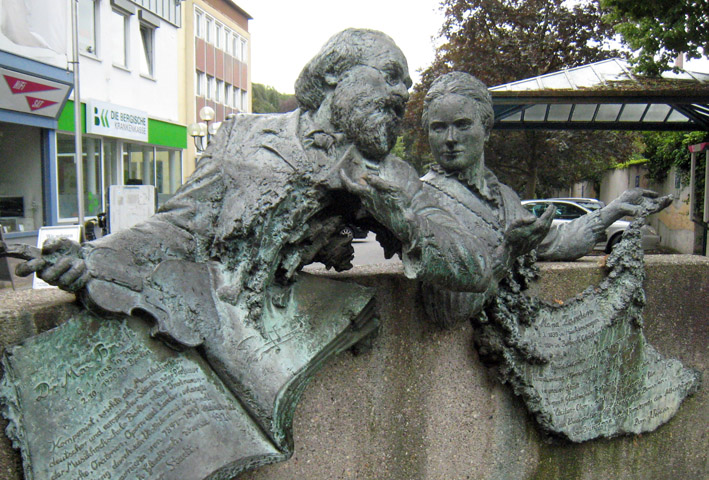
Memorial for Bruch and Maria Zanders in the pedestrian zone of Bergisch Gladbach city centre

In 1918, toward the end of his life, Bruch once more considered smaller ensembles with the composition of two string quintets, of which one served as the basis for a string octet, written in 1920 for four violins, two violas, cello, and a double bass. This octet is somewhat at odds with the innovative style of the decade. While composers such as Schönberg and Stravinsky were part of the forward-looking modern trend, Bruch and others sought to remain within the Romantic tradition, avoiding the era's revolutionary spirit. All three of these late chamber works exhibit a 'concertante' style in which the first violin part is predominant and contains much of the musical interest. By the time they came to be performed professionally for the first time, in the 1930s, Bruch's reputation had deteriorated and he was known only for the famous Concerto.

Bruch's other works include his two less well-known concerti for violin and orchestra, No. 2 in D minor (1878) and No. 3 in D minor (1891) (which Bruch regarded as at least as fine as the famous first); as well as a Concerto for Clarinet, Viola, and Orchestra, and many more pieces for violin, viola, or cello, and orchestra. His three symphonies contain distinctive German Romantic melodic writing that is orchestrated effectively.

To this output he added three orchestral suites in later life, of which the third has a remarkable history. Its origin can be found in Capri, where Bruch had witnessed a procession in which a tune was played on a tuba that "could very well be the basis of a funeral march", and would be the basis of this suite, which he finished in 1909. The American Sutro sisters piano duo, Rose and Ottilie Sutro, however, had asked Bruch for a concerto specifically for them, which he produced by arranging this suite into a double piano concerto, but only to be played within the Americas and not beyond. The Concerto in A flat minor for Two Pianos and Orchestra, Op. 88a, was finished in 1912 for the Sutros, but was never played in the original version. They performed the work only twice, in two different versions of their own. The score was withdrawn in 1917 and rediscovered only after Ottilie Sutro's death in 1970. The sisters also played a major part in the fate of the manuscript of the Violin Concerto No. 1: Bruch had sent it to them to be sold in the United States, but they kept it and sold it only for their own profit.

Violinists Joseph Joachim and Willy Hess advised Bruch on his writing for that instrument, and Hess premiered some of his works, including the Concert Piece for Violin and Orchestra, Op. 84, which was composed for him.
