= Sutro District =

National Park Service historic district in western San Francisco within the GGNRA

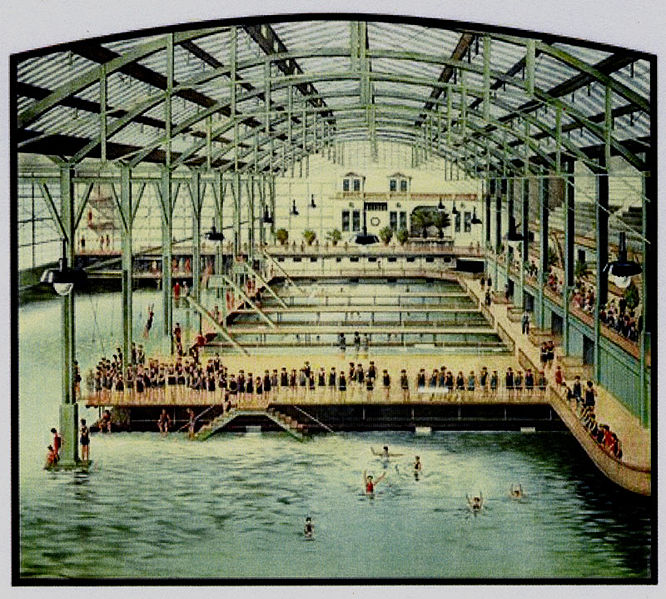
Main plunge, Sutro Baths (1896).

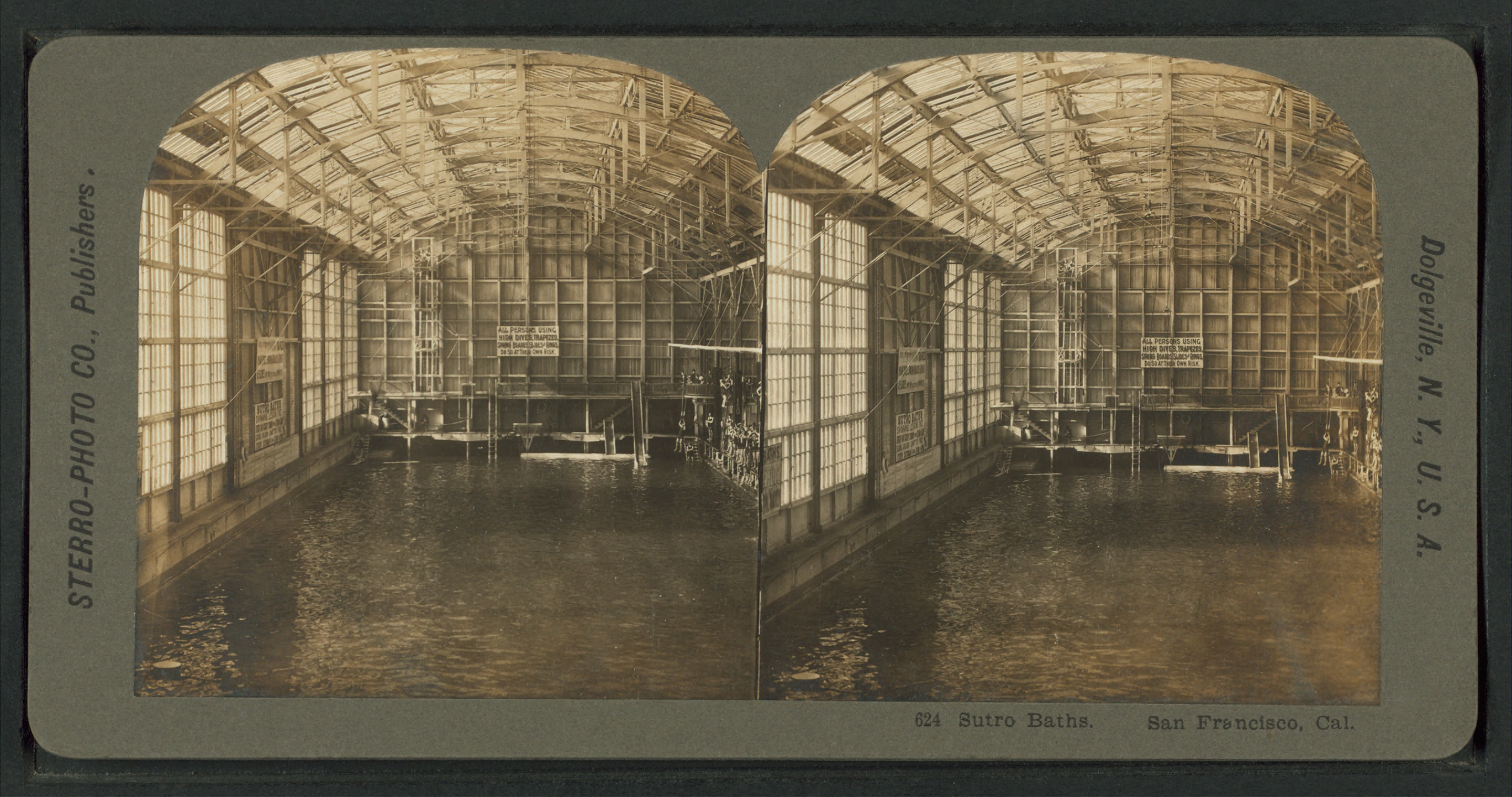
Main plunge, Sutro Baths.

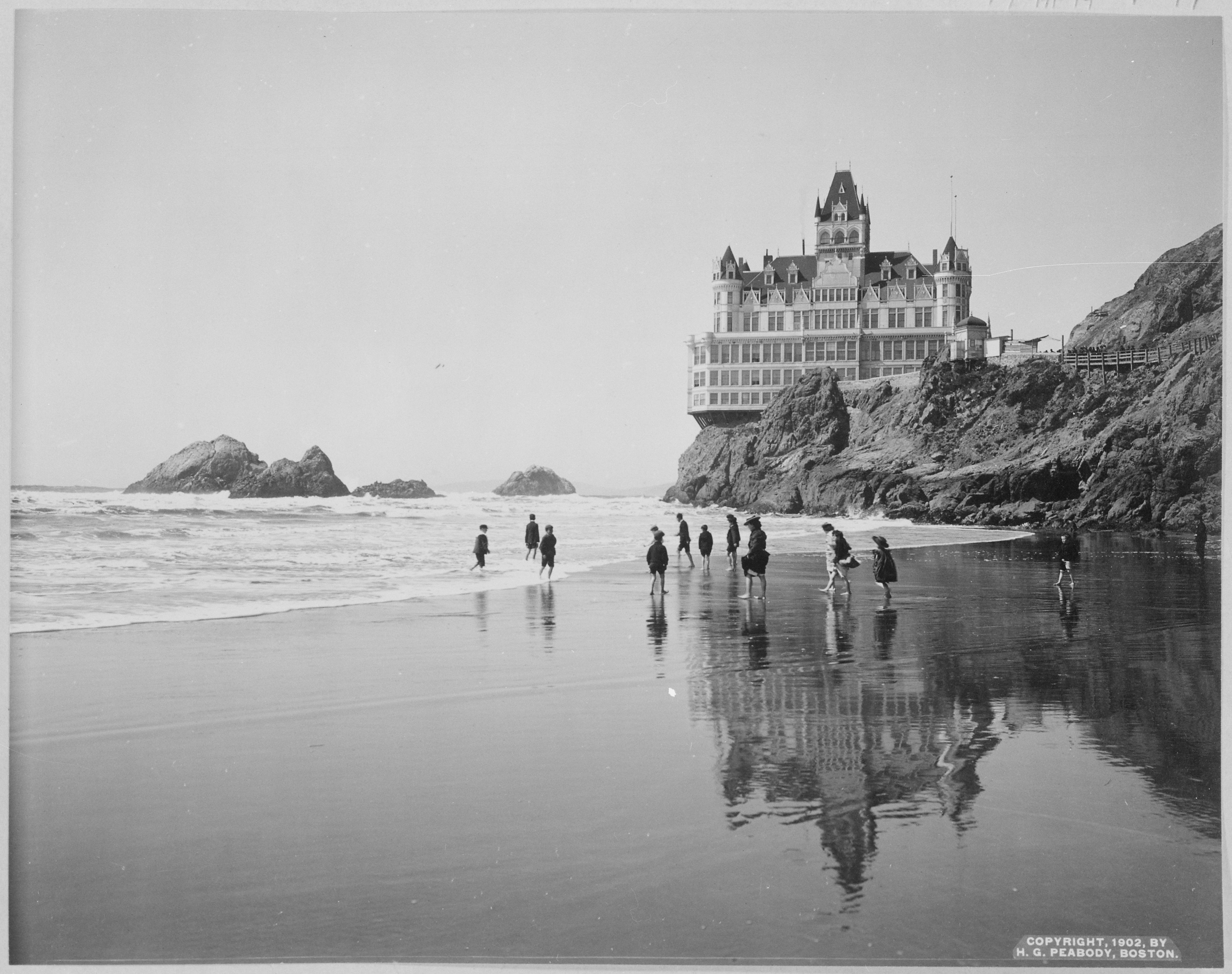
The second Cliff House and Seal Rocks.

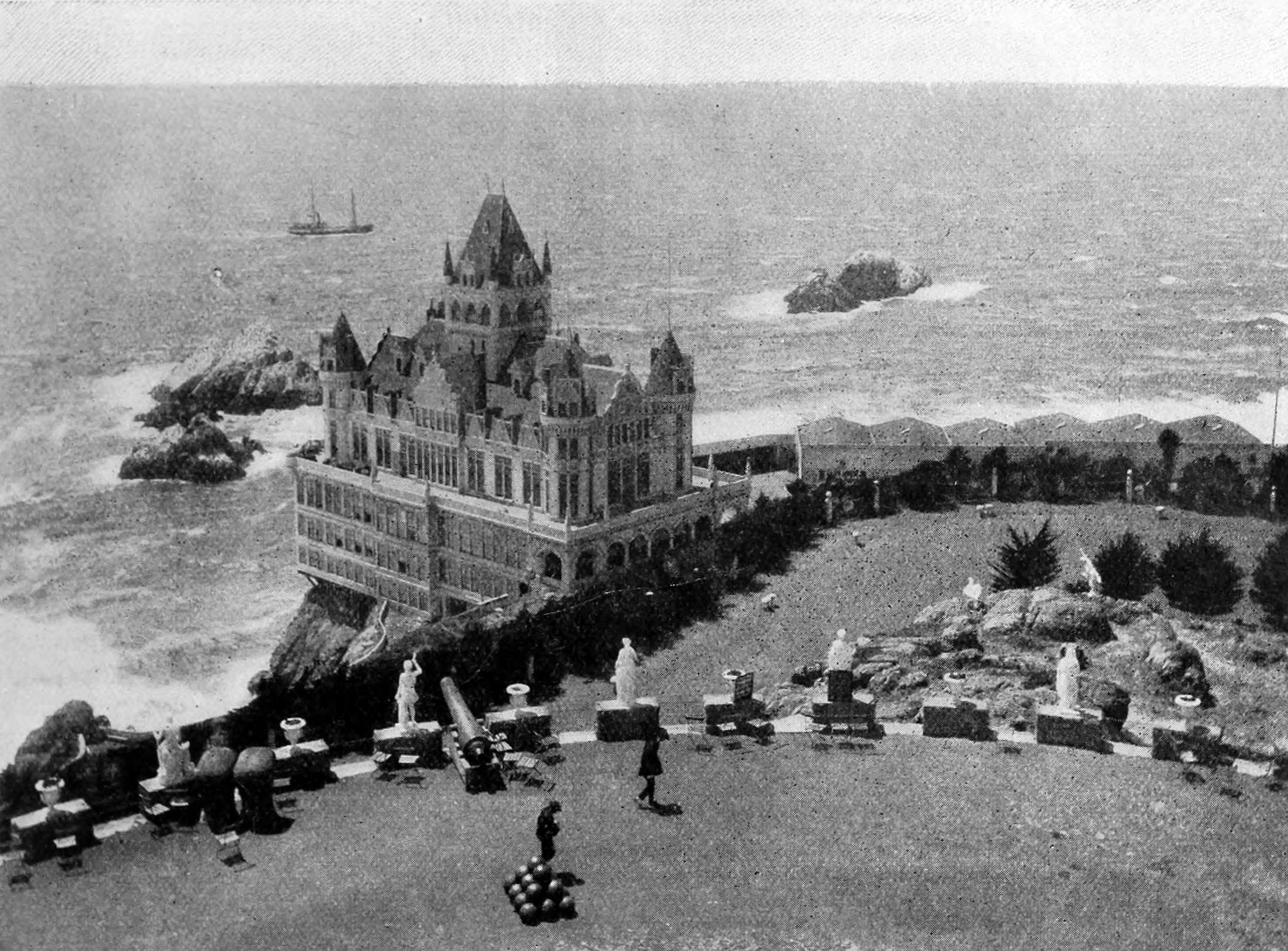
The second Cliff House, from the Sutro Heights estate gardens.

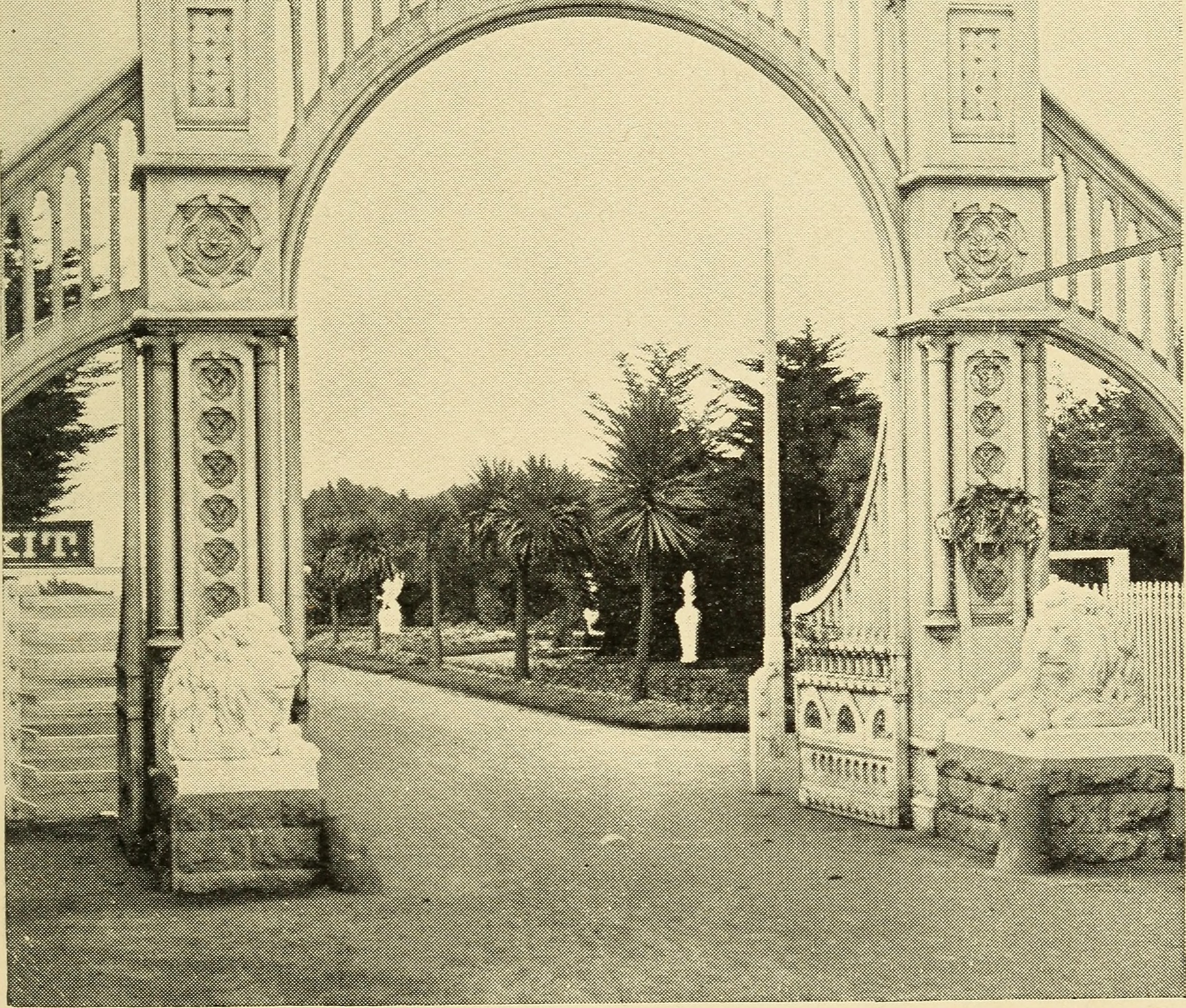
Sutro Heights gardens (1895).

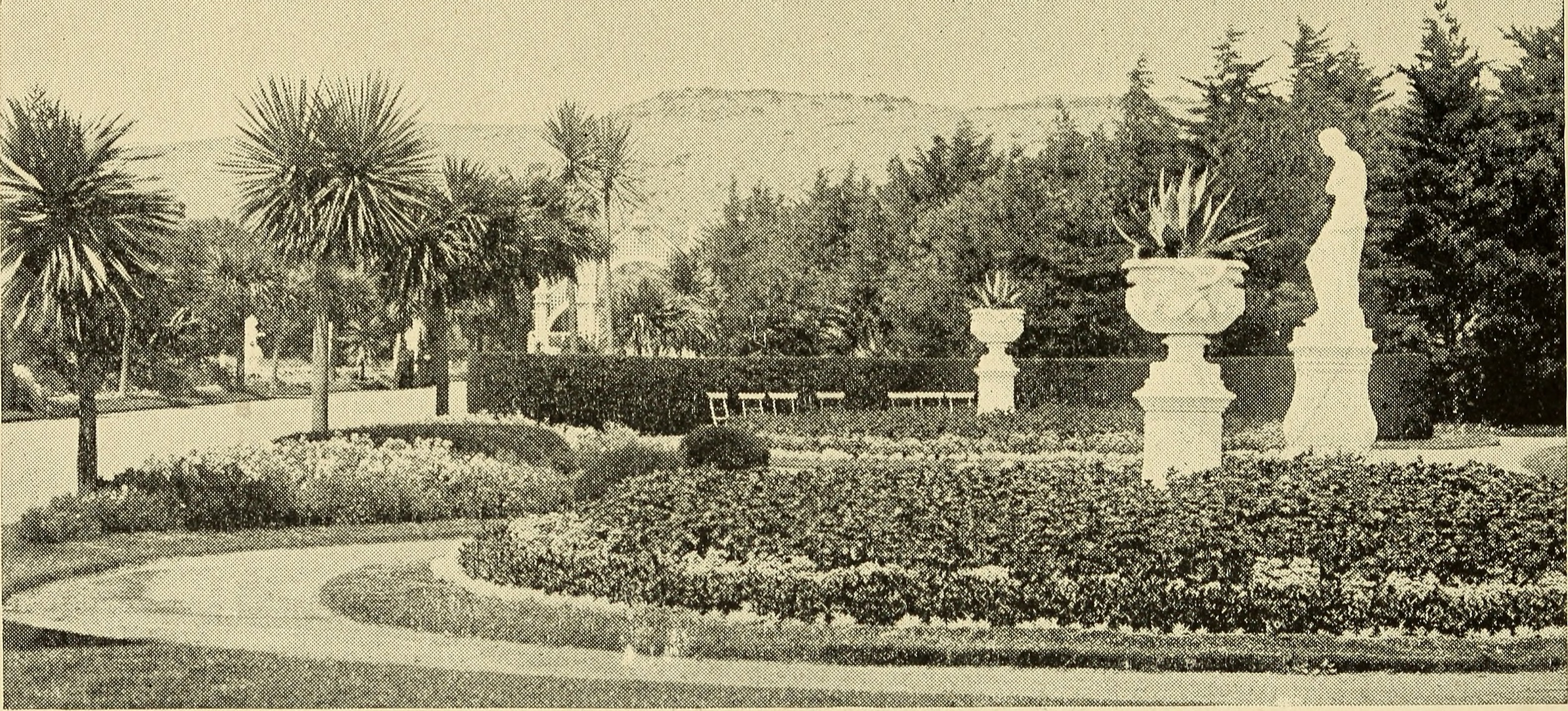
Sutro Heights gardens (1895).

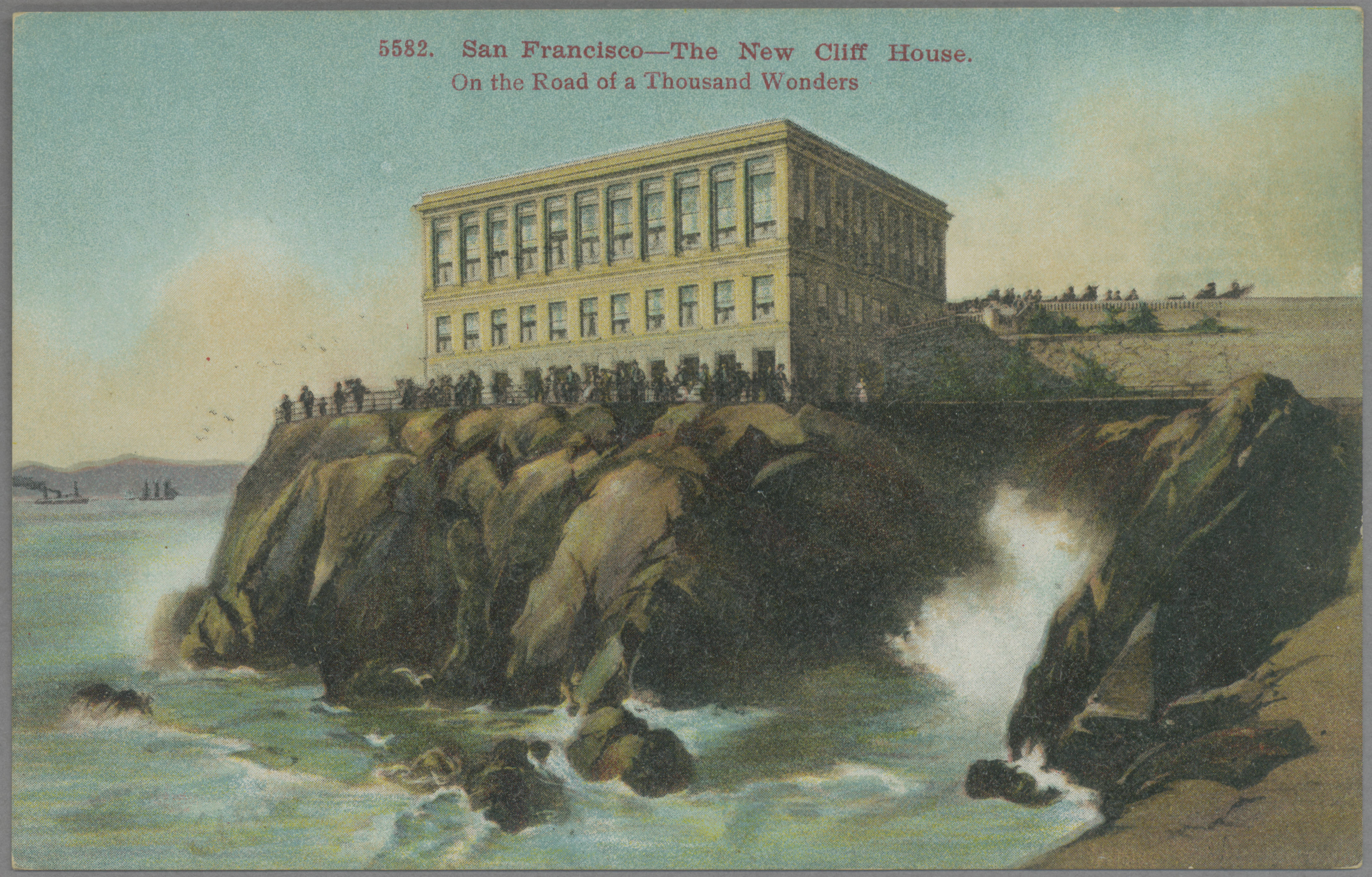
The third Cliff House.

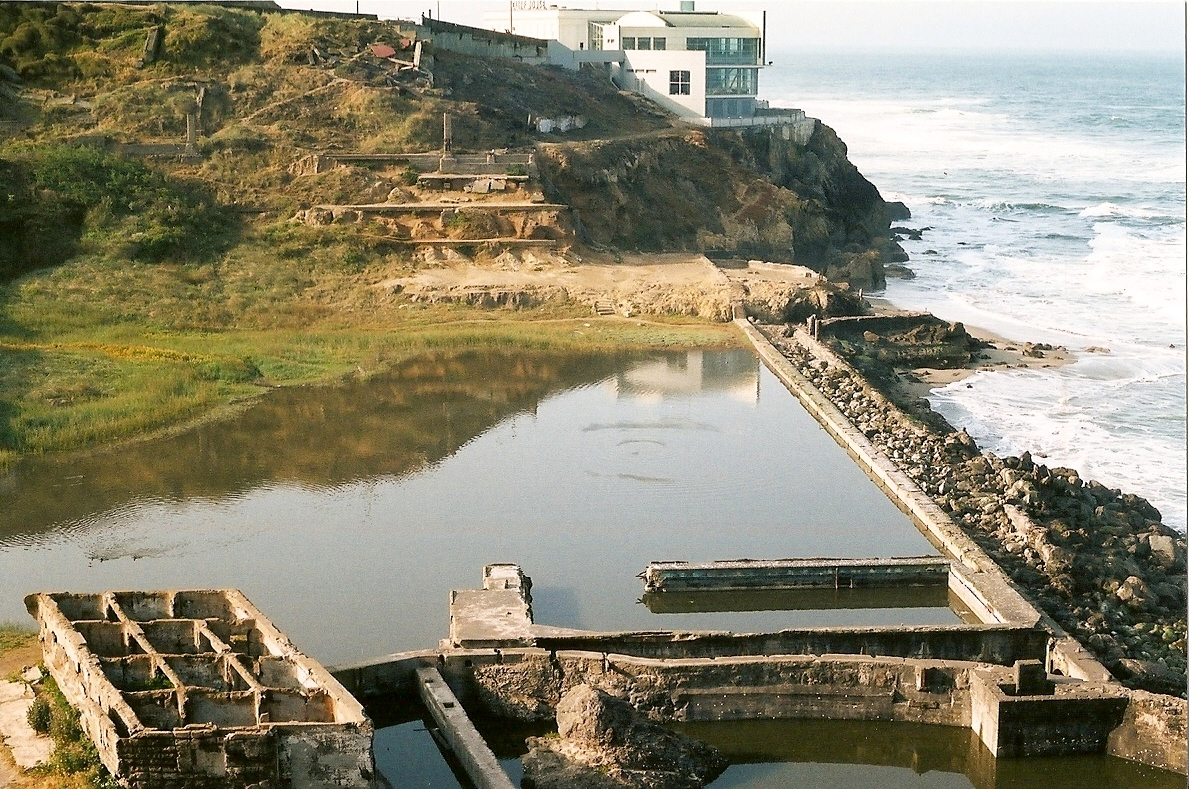
Sutro Baths ruins and fourth Cliff House (2008).

The Sutro Historic District is a National Park Service historic district in the Lands End area of the Outer Richmond District in western San Francisco, California. It is within the Golden Gate National Recreation Area, since being acquired by the National Park Service in 1977.

The historic district includes attractions along Point Lobos Avenue at the coast originally built by Adolph Sutro, a Comstock Lode silver baron, and a major land owner/developer in and mayor of San Francisco. The 49-Mile Scenic Drive passes through it.

== History ==
=== Adolf Sutro Era ===
In 1881, Adolf Sutro purchased 22 acres (89,000 m^{2}) of undeveloped land south of Point Lobos (San Francisco) and north of Ocean Beach at the western edge of the city. It included a promontory overlooking the Pacific, with scenic views of the Marin Headlands, Mount Tamalpais, and the Golden Gate. Sutro built his residence on a rocky ledge there, above the first Cliff House. The property had scenic views of the Pacific Ocean, Ocean Beach, Seal Rocks, the first and second Cliff House, Marin Headlands, Mount Tamalpais, and the Golden Gate.

Features Sutro developed on his land holdings in the Lands End area include:

- Sutro Heights Park, on the site of the former Sutro Heights estate of Adolph Sutro. He opened the extensive gardens to the public in 1885. They were a city park from 1938 to 1976, when the City of San Francisco transferred ownership of Sutro Heights to the National Park Service, to be managed as part of the Golden Gate National Recreation Area.
- Sutro's Aquarium (opened 1887), a concrete basin located in a cove just north of the Cliff House, fed fresh seawater by a 8 feet (2.4 m) high and 153 feet (47 m) long tunnel cut through an adjacent cliff. A heated, glass- enclosed pool was sited on higher ground above the tidal basin and featured a stocked supply of more exotic sea creatures.
- Sutro Baths (1894–1964), a massive public bath house and freshwater swimming facility. It included six saltwater swimming tanks of varying sizes, shapes, and water temperatures, tiers of bleacher-like seats, providing seating for thousands of spectators, and a massive arched glass roof made from 100,000 square feet of stained glass and supported by 600 tons of iron girders.
- Cliff House (1896–1907), the second and elaborate Victorian chateau-style palace building.
- Sutro Pleasure Grounds at Merrie Way (1896–1898), a grand amusement park.

The Park and Ocean Railroad had provided relatively expensive transport to the Cliff House via Golden Gate Park. To provide inexpensive and more scenic transportation for visitors to the "Sutro District" features, in 1885 he invested significantly in The Cliff House and Ferries Railroad, a new passenger steam train line from downtown San Francisco via Point Lobos to the Sutro Heights area.

=== Post−Sutro Era ===
Adolph Sutro died in 1898. His daughter Emma Sutro Merritt then moved into the Sutro Heights estate. Until the early 1920s the gardens remained in relatively good condition with the plantings maintained in a state of maturity. In 1920, the ownership of Sutro Heights was transferred to the City of San Francisco under the condition that it be "forever held and maintained as a free public resort or park under the name of Sutro Heights." Between 1920 and 1933 the Merritts continued to allow visitors access to Sutro Heights, but provided for minimal maintenance of the site.

The second Cliff House burned to the ground in 1907. The third Cliff House was a lower Neoclassical style structure designed by Reid & Reid. It opened in 1909 and prospered until 1918, when the involvement of the United States in World War I required closure of all establishments within a half mile of Fort Miley Military Reservation to the north on Point Lobos (San Francisco). The Cliff House closed once more in 1925, not to reopen again until 1937.

In 1933, at the request of Emma Sutro Merritt, the City of San Francisco agreed to assume maintenance of Sutro Heights but there was no major improvement or rehabilitation of the grounds. The garden's condition declined after maintenance responsibility was deeded to the city, and it accelerated after her death in 1938.

In 1937, the city submitted a proposal to the Works Progress Administration (WPA) for the rehabilitation of the grounds at Sutro Heights. When Emma Sutro Merritt died in residence at Sutro Heights in 1938, the WPA was in the process of further stabilizing the western slopes with an elaborate series of artificial concrete cliffs. Following her death, the WPA proceeded to demolish the aging Sutro residence, then in a state of serious disrepair, and also the remains of the conservatory, entrance gates, and Dolce far Niente Balcony vista point.

During World War II, Sutro Heights was closed for security reasons because of its proximity to Fort Miley Military Reservation. In 1949 the City of San Francisco commissioned a plan for the rehabilitation of the park. Little of the plan was implemented, except converting most of the planting beds to lawns. Between the late 1940s and the 1970s there was considerable vandalism and neglect at Sutro Heights Park.

In 1951, battered still further by an even steeper drop in attendance at the Sutro Baths during World War II, Gustav Sutro offered the property for sale. George K. Whitney, owner of the Cliff House and nearby Playland at the Beach at Ocean Beach purchased it. He converted all of the swimming tanks to one large ice skating complex. Robert D. Fraser, a controversial developer, acquired the property in 1964 intending to build an apartment tower. In June 1966 a fire at Sutro Baths burned the once-grand structure to its foundations, and resulting sentiments impeded Fraser's development plan.

=== National Park Service ===
National Park Service management efforts since the City of San Francisco transferred ownership of Sutro Heights Park to it in 1977 are to identify and preserve the historic features remaining on the site. Concrete headers, planters, fountains, and statues were removed for storage and cataloging. Reproductions of the remaining statues, including the entrance gate lions, and the Stag and Diana, were cast and re-erected on the site.

In 1976, the National Park Service acquired the ownership of the Sutro Baths site. The site is heavily visited by people who examine the remains of the baths and experience the feeling and setting of the site. In 1977, the National Park Service also acquired the ownership of the third Cliff House that was built in 1909.

=== Historic district ===
The National Park Service applied to have the area listed as a historic district on the National Register of Historic Places in 2000, under the proposed names Sutro Historic Landscape District and/or Adolph Sutro Historic District. The historic district listing was unsuccessful, but the Camera Obscura at the Cliff House was added to the National Register.

== Present day ==
The Sutro Historic District, including Sutro Heights Park and the Sutro Baths site, continue to provide open space for strolling, exploring history, wildlife viewing, picnicking, and other recreation activities. The historic Cliff House and Camera Obscura are still visitor attractions.

The National Park Service−Golden Gate National Recreation Area has on site interpretive history programs and events, and various historical information/images websites and online history documents (see References + External links below).

== See also ==
- 49-Mile Scenic Drive
- List of San Francisco Designated Landmarks
- National Register of Historic Places listings in San Francisco, California
