= Concerto for Two Pianos and Orchestra (Bruch) =

1912 composition by Max Bruch

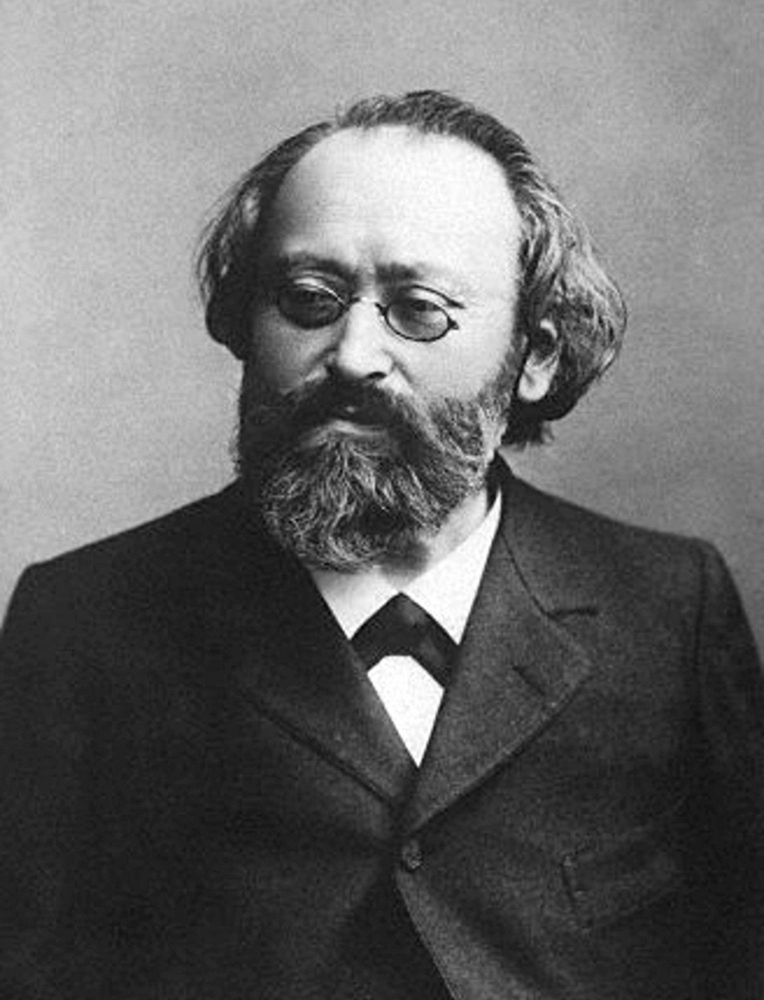
Max Bruch

The Concerto for Two Pianos and Orchestra, Op. 88a, was written by Max Bruch in 1912. It is in four movements, written in the rarely seen key of A♭ minor, and takes about 25 minutes to perform.

It is sometimes referred to as Bruch's Double Concerto, although this could also refer to his Concerto for Clarinet, Viola, and Orchestra, Op. 88 (1911). There are claims that the two-piano concerto is based on the earlier concerto, but thematically these two works seem to have little or nothing in common, and this supposed relationship seems to be an erroneous assumption based purely on the works having similar opus numbers.

== Structure ==
The movements are:

1. Andante sostenuto
2. Andante con moto – Allegro molto vivace
3. Adagio ma non troppo
4. Andante – Allegro

== History ==
In 1911, Bruch had heard the American duo-pianist sisters Rose and Ottilie Sutro play his Fantasy in D minor for 2 pianos, Op. 11, and was so delighted that he agreed to write a double concerto for them.

Bruch did not write an entirely fresh piece, but reworked music he had been writing for his planned Suite No. 3 for Organ and Orchestra (also referred to as his Orchestral Suite No. 3). The Suite used some melodies that Bruch had heard on Good Friday 1904, while convalescing in Capri, and these melodies appear in the concerto.

Bruch gave the Sutro sisters the sole performing rights to the work. Without Bruch's permission, however, they rewrote the concerto themselves to suit their pianistic abilities, copyrighting their version and depositing it with the Library of Congress in 1916. They performed the premiere of this version with the Philadelphia Orchestra under Leopold Stokowski on 29 December 1916. In 1917 they played a further revised version of the work, with the number of movements reduced from four to three, with the New York Philharmonic under Josef Stránský. Bruch himself conducted a private rehearsal of the concerto with the Sutro sisters in Berlin, but gave permission for it to be played only in the United States (it is not clear from the source which version this was; apparently he knew that the Sutros had made revisions, but to what extent is not known).

The Sutros withdrew the concerto after the second performance and never played it again. They never played Bruch's original version at all. But they continued to make revisions to their version, amounting to thousands of changes, the last by Ottilie as late as 1961 (Rose having died in 1957). Ottilie died in September 1970, aged 98. Some of her miscellaneous scores, manuscripts and newspaper cuttings were auctioned in January 1971. The pianist Nathan Twining purchased a box of unidentified papers for $11, and it proved to contain the autograph score of Rose and Ottilie's version of Bruch's concerto, a work unknown to him. The orchestral parts for the original version were bought by other people at the same auction, and Twining managed to track them down and buy the parts back from them. He and Martin Berkofsky then reconstructed Bruch's original version, and they recorded it for the first time in November 1973, with the London Symphony Orchestra under Antal Doráti.

The concerto has also been arranged as a work for six hands at three pianos, by Wilhelm Brückner-Rüggeberg.

The knowledge of the existence of the concerto has its own peculiar history. It was listed in the 5th edition (1954) of Grove's Dictionary, as Op. 88, but it was not listed in the New Grove in 1980 at all. It now appears in references as Op. 88a.

== Recordings ==
In addition to the 1973 premiere recording mentioned above, the Concerto for Two Pianos and Orchestra has been recorded by:

- Güher and Süher Pekinel, with the Philharmonia Orchestra under Sir Neville Marriner
- Martin Berkofsky again, this time with David Hagan, with the Berlin Symphony Orchestra under Lutz Herbig
- Katia and Marielle Labèque, with the Philharmonia under Semyon Bychkov
- Robert Cowan and Joan Yarborough, with the Royal Philharmonic Orchestra under Paul Freeman.
