= Florence Sutro =

American lawyer and organizer

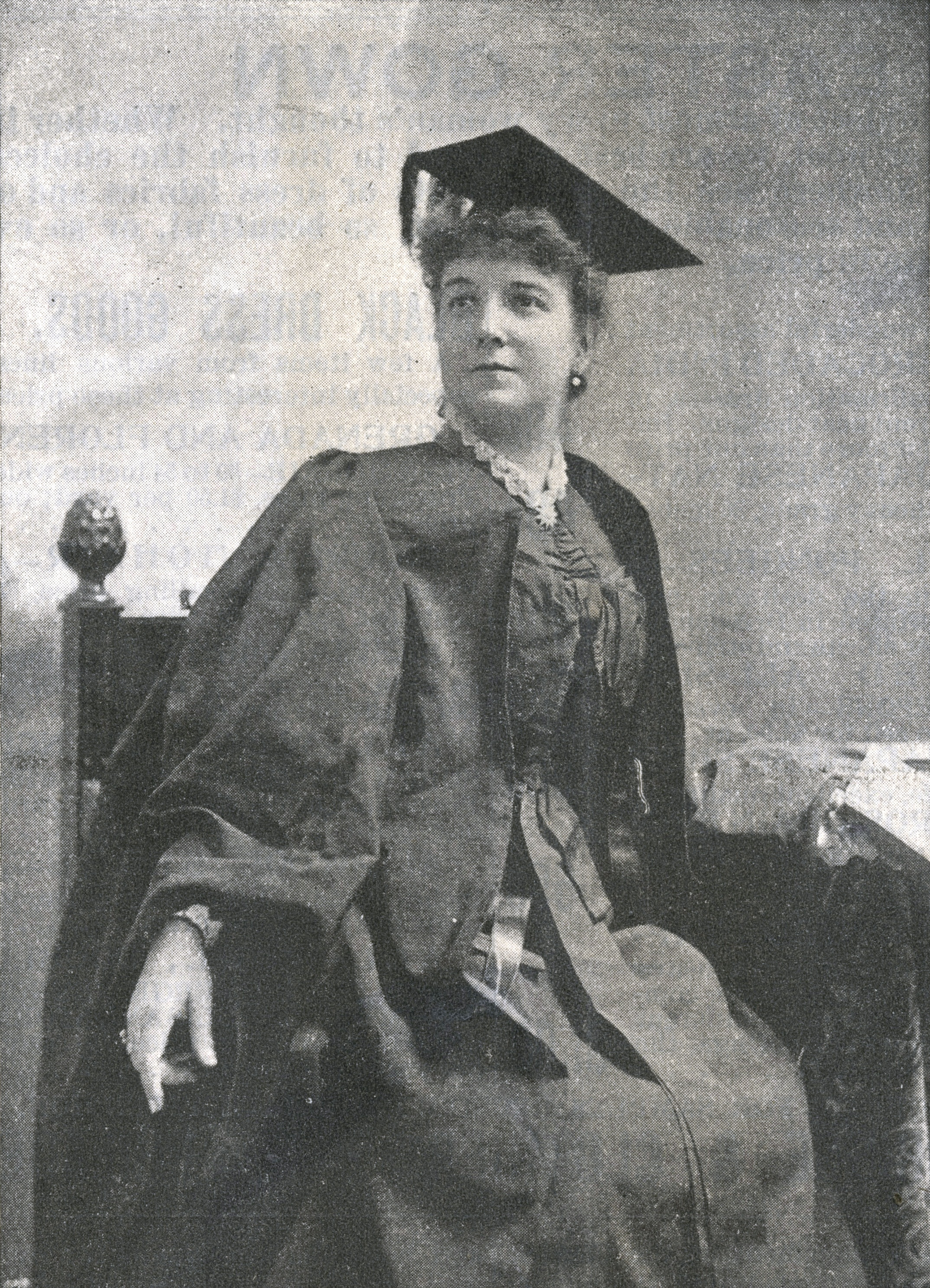
- Sutro in 1896 (photograph by Aimé Dupont, first published in The Home Journal, March 18, 1896
- Born: Florence Edith Clinton; May 1, 1865; England
- Died: April 27, 1906 (aged 41); New York City, US
- Occupations: lawyer, organizer
- Spouse: Theodore Sutro
- Relatives: Otto Sutro (brother-in-law); Adolph Sutro (brother-in-law)

Florence Sutro (May 1, 1865 – April 27, 1906), sometimes known as Mrs. Theodore Sutro, was a lawyer and organizer, most known for creating the National Federation of Women's Music Clubs and being its first president.

== Biography ==
Florence Edith Clinton was born in England. Her father was Harry W. Clinton (1837—1893), son of Captain Harry and Mary Elizabeth (Villiers) Clinton. On her father's side she was descended from George Clinton the younger son of the 6th Earl of Lincoln, within the Clinton family lineage. Her mother was Frances Clinton (born Greenwood) (1839–1869). After her mother's death, her father immigrated with the family to Brooklyn, New York. She showed considerable musical talent as a child. At the age of 13 she won first prize of $1,000 in a contest with 950 other children for her playing of Franz Liszt's Hungarian Rhapsody No. 2. She attended the Grand Conservatory of New York where she was the first woman to graduate with the degree of Doctor of Music.

She married Theodore Sutro (1845–1927), a lawyer and financier and brother of Otto Sutro and Adolph Sutro, on October 1, 1884. She thus became part of society in both social and intellectual circles, while devoting time to painting and music. "As a pianist she excels both in execution and sympathetic touch, while her canvases are welcome features at many of the exhibitions of the National Academy of Design." Encouraged by her husband, she took up the study of law attending women's classes at the City College of New York. Upon graduating in 1891, she was the class valedictorian and delivered the graduation address, "Why I Study Law", which labeled her "a speaker of wonderful magnetism and clearness." Quoting from the address: "Law is beautiful...This great sense of union and order which pervades all life" makes the study of law "one of the most broadest means possible for attaining to true culture." Although declining to enter the Bar, Sutro authored Women in Music and Law in 1895 which included an extensive list of women composers and their compositions.

She devoted her energies to charitable organizations (such as being the vice-president of the New York Kindergarten and Potted-Plant Association). She was involved in the 1893 World's Columbian Exposition festivities in Chicago during which the Infanta Eulalia of Spain visited the United States. Sutro traveled extensively through the United States, and "was one of the few women to have visited the Grand Canyon" (as stated in an 1893 biographical entry).

Theodore and Florence Sutro were active advocates for women's suffrage. "The society women of New-York want to vote. Having reached this determination, they have set about accomplishing their desire in the energetic manner characteristic of them on all occasions. Without any particular display of flags or brass bands, they organized themselves for action, and the Constitutional Convention, when it meets May 8 at Albany, will be confronted with the results in no uncertain manner."

In the spring of 1895 she was painted by the Swiss-born American artist Adolfo Müller-Ury. According to The New York Times, Mrs. Sutro exhibited the portrait to a group of her friends who admired it at a reception she held at her home on April 13, 1895. It was exhibited at the National Academy of Design, March/April 1896, No. 328, as Portrait of Mrs. Theodore Sutro and listed as lent by the sitter. A review of the exhibition stated that "There are also a number of portraits of women, among the best of which is one of Mrs. Theodore Sutro, by A. Muller-Ury."

She died of pleurisy and of "complication of diseases" at her home on 320 West 102nd Street in New York City, and was buried at Woodlawn Cemetery.

== National Federation of Women's Music Clubs ==
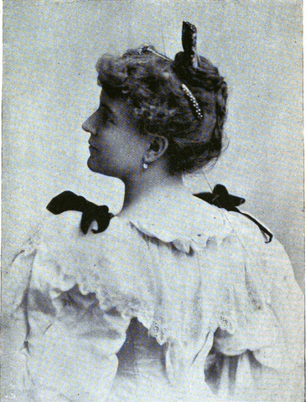
Florence Sutro (1895)

One of Florence Sutro's most important contributions was the creation of the National Federation of Women's Music Clubs. In the 1890s she was president of the Woman's Department of the Music Teachers National Association (MTNA). In her address to the MTNA of June 25, 1897, she stated that men have not given women the chance to excel in music due to existing prejudice. To remedy that situation she created a Woman's Department" of the MTNA. She foretold of a large growth in women active in musical composition and other areas due to the growing opportunities, such as those provided by women's colleges. In her address, she notes the growing numbers of women involved not only in music making but in music research, experimentation, and ethnography. The musical program at the MTNA conference included works by Adele Aus der Ohe, Maude Valerie White, Cecil Chaminade, Celeste D. Heckster, Fannie Morris Spencer, Mrs. Korn, Mrs. Danziger-Rosebault, Laura Sedgwick Collins, Amy Beach, Margaret Ruthven Lang and Amy Fay.

As a result of her work with the MTNA, Sutro announced the creation of the National Federation of Women's Music Clubs at the conclusion of the MTNA meeting on June 28, 1897, at which 48 clubs were represented. The purpose of the organization was to "establish a feeling of fraternity among musical clubs, by frequent correspondence and an annual meeting. But a minor cause for consideration lies in the fact that clubs joining the federation may engage artists together, the benefit of which is mutual to both club and artist." Sutro was the temporary chairperson. Sutro was elected temporary head, until elections were to be held at the initial meeting in Chicago in January 1898. Sutro, who had spent months organization a national organization, expected to be elected president. But political infighting led by Rose Thomas (wife of conductor Theodore Thomas) and Mrs. Edwin F. Uhl, resulted in the election of Uhl. Sutro later explained that Thomas and Uhl had tried to form a group for amateur women musicians four year earlier but had failed. Thus it was jealously that led them to unseat Sutro, with no remuneration of the expenses for which she paid out of her own savings. Even though she expressed deep hurt at the way she was treated, Sutro was thankful that there was now a National Federation of Women's Music Clubs. At the Federation's 1899 meeting Mrs. Uhl was again elected president. In subsequent years, the Sutro's work and the Federation's New York origins were not even mentioned. By 1903 Sutro asserted in local New York periodicals that she was the founder of the Federation.

Despite the group conflict with which the Federation was born, by 1903 Musical Courier filled at least three-quarters of a page with the activities of women's clubs, indicating their successful proliferation throughout the United States.

== Books ==
- Women in Music and Law (New York: Author's Publishing Company, 1895)
