= Rose and Ottilie Sutro =

American piano duo sisters

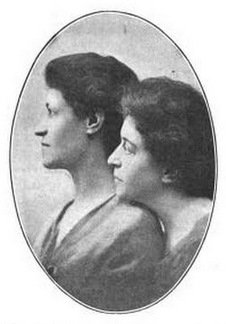
Rose and Ottilie Sutro, from a 1917 advertisement.

Rose Sutro (15 September 1870 – 11 January 1957) and Ottilie Sutro (4 January 1872 – 12 September 1970) were American sisters who were notable as one of the first recognised duo-piano teams. It has been claimed they were the first such team, but Willi and Louis Thern preceded them by almost 30 years. They were also noted confidence tricksters, repeatedly swindling the German composer Max Bruch by taking advantage of his trusting nature - first, by making and publishing unauthorized changes to his Concerto for Two Pianos and Orchestra in A♭ minor, and second, stealing and absconding with the autograph copy of his Violin Concerto No. 1 in G minor, later selling it in 1949.

== Biography ==
Rose Laura Sutro and Ottilie Sutro were both born in Baltimore. Their parents were Otto Sutro (a German-born Jewish organist, composer, music publisher, and conductor of the Oratorio Society of Baltimore); and Arianna née Handy (a pianist, singer, and daughter of a former chief justice of Mississippi, Alexander Hamilton Handy). Their uncle was Adolph Sutro, Mayor of San Francisco and founder of the Sutro Baths.

They were initially taught the piano by their mother. They studied in Berlin at the Royal Hochschule für Musik under Karl Heinrich Barth, and made their debut in London in July 1894. Their American debut was with the Seidl Society in Brooklyn, New York on 13 November of the same year, in a Bach concerto.

Ottilie injured her hand in 1904, making her unable to perform until 1910. She made an arrangement for two pianos of Frédéric Chopin's Nocturne No. 2 in E♭, Op. 9, No. 2, which has been recorded by Anthony Goldstone and Caroline Clemmow. She also arranged Edward MacDowell's Dirge, and, with William Henry Humiston, MacDowell's Love Song, Op. 48, No. 2.

For Duo-Art, they recorded the "Entrée de fête" from Charles Gounod's Suite concertante and Dvořák's Slavonic Dance No. 1 in C.

Rose died in Baltimore in 1957, aged 86, and Ottilie in 1970, aged 98.

== The Sutros and Max Bruch ==
Max Bruch was so pleased with Rose and Ottilie's playing of his Fantasy in D minor for 2 pianos, Op. 11, in 1911, that he agreed to write a concerto for them. In 1912, he wrote the Concerto for Two Pianos and Orchestra in A♭ minor, Op. 88a, which was a reworking of music he had written for a planned suite for organ and orchestra. Bruch gave them the sole performing rights to the concerto. Without Bruch's permission, however, they rewrote the work themselves to suit their pianistic abilities, altered the orchestration, copyrighted their version and deposited it with the Library of Congress in 1916. They performed the premiere of this version with the Philadelphia Orchestra under Leopold Stokowski on 29 December 1916. In 1917 they played a further revised version of the work, with the number of movements reduced from four to three, with the New York Philharmonic under Josef Stránský. Bruch himself conducted a private rehearsal of the work with the Sutro sisters in Berlin, but gave permission for it to be played only in the United States (it is not clear from the source which version this was; apparently he knew that the Sutros had made revisions, but to what extent is not known).

The Sutros withdrew the concerto after the second performance and never played it again; they never played Bruch's original version at all. But they continued to make revisions to their version, amounting to thousands of changes, the last by Ottilie as late as 1961 (Rose having died in 1957). Ottilie died in September 1970, aged 98, only three days before Rose's centenary. Some of her miscellaneous scores, manuscripts and newspaper cuttings were auctioned in January 1971. The pianist Nathan Twining (pianist) purchased a box of unidentified papers for $11, and it proved to contain the autograph score of Rose and Ottilie's version of Bruch's concerto, a work unknown to him. The orchestral parts for the original version were bought by other people at the same auction, and Twining managed to track them down and buy the parts back from them. He and Martin Berkofsky then reconstructed Bruch's original version, and they recorded it for the first time in November 1973, with the London Symphony Orchestra under Antal Doráti.

Rose and Ottilie Sutro were also heavily involved in the fate of the manuscript of Bruch's best-known work, his Violin Concerto No. 1 in G minor. Bruch had sold the score to the publisher August Cranz outright for a small lump sum (250 Talers) - but he kept a copy of his own. At the end of World War I, he was destitute, having been unable to enforce the payment of royalties for his other works due to chaotic worldwide economic conditions. He sent the autograph to the Sutros, so that they could sell it in the United States and send him the money. Bruch died in October 1920, without ever receiving any money from the Sutro sisters. They had decided to keep the score themselves, but they claimed to have sold it, and sent Bruch's family some worthless German paper money as the alleged proceeds of the alleged sale. They persistently refused to divulge any details of the purchaser. In 1949, they sold the autograph to Mary Flagler Cary, whose collection, including the Bruch concerto, now resides at the Morgan Library & Museum in New York City.
