= National Federation of Women's Music Clubs =

American women's club

The National Federation of Women's Music Clubs was founded by Florence Sutro (1865 – 1906), who was herself a musician and painter. She was its first president.
