= Adolph Sutro =

24th Mayor of San Francisco from 1895 to 1897

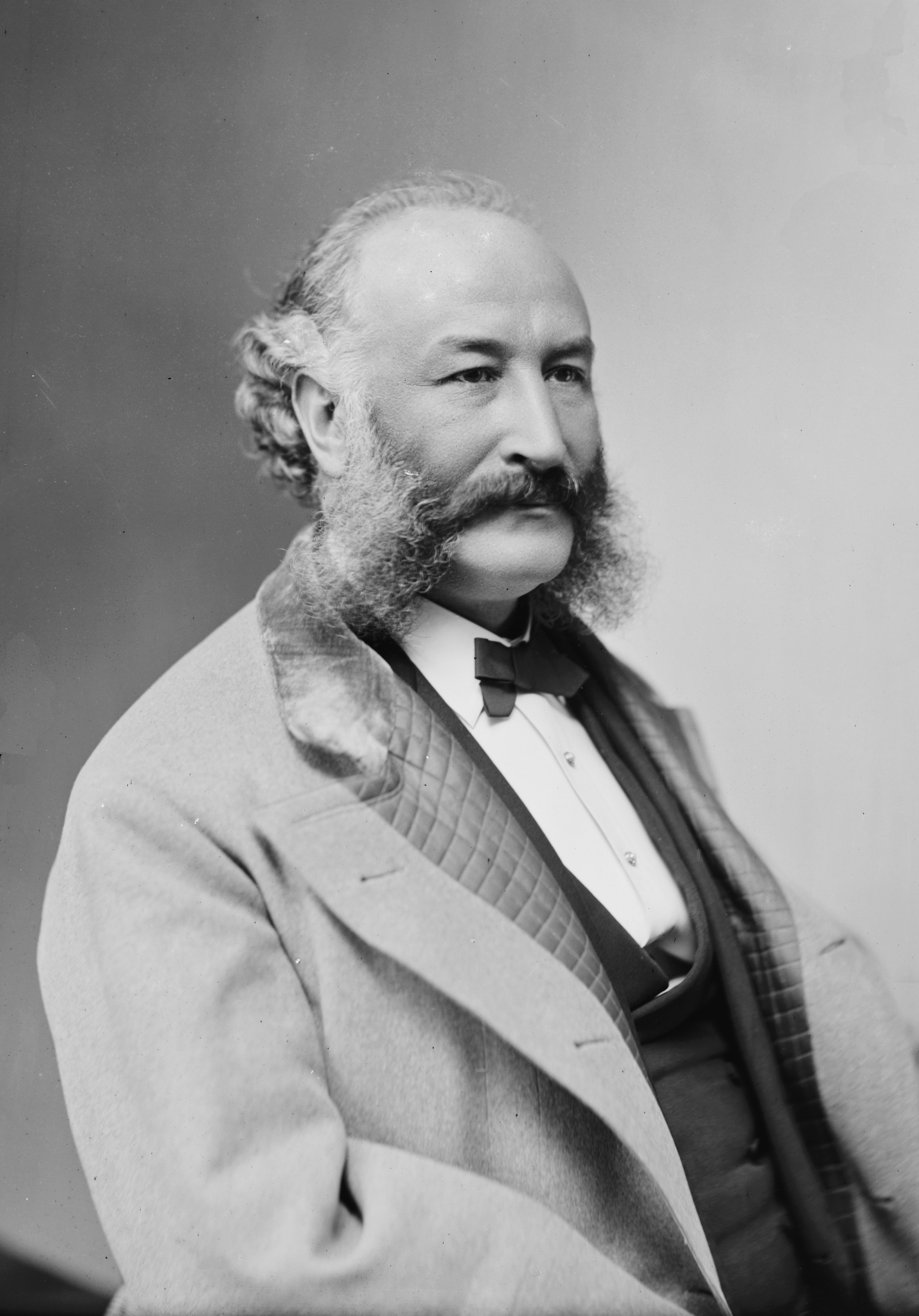
- Portrait by Brady c. 1865–1880

24th Mayor of San Francisco
- In office January 7, 1895 – January 3, 1897
- Preceded by: Levi Richard Ellert
- Succeeded by: James D. Phelan

Personal details
- Born: Adolph Heinrich Joseph Sutro; April 29, 1830 Aachen, Prussia
- Died: August 8, 1898 (aged 68) San Francisco, California, U.S.
- Resting place: Home of Peace Cemetery
- Party: Populist
- Profession: Businessman

Adolph Heinrich Joseph Sutro (April 29, 1830 – August 8, 1898) was a German-American engineer, politician and philanthropist who served as the 24th mayor of San Francisco from 1895 until 1897. Born a German Jew, he moved to Virginia City, Nevada and made a fortune at the Comstock Lode. Several places in San Francisco bear his name in remembrance of his life and contributions to the city.

== Early life ==
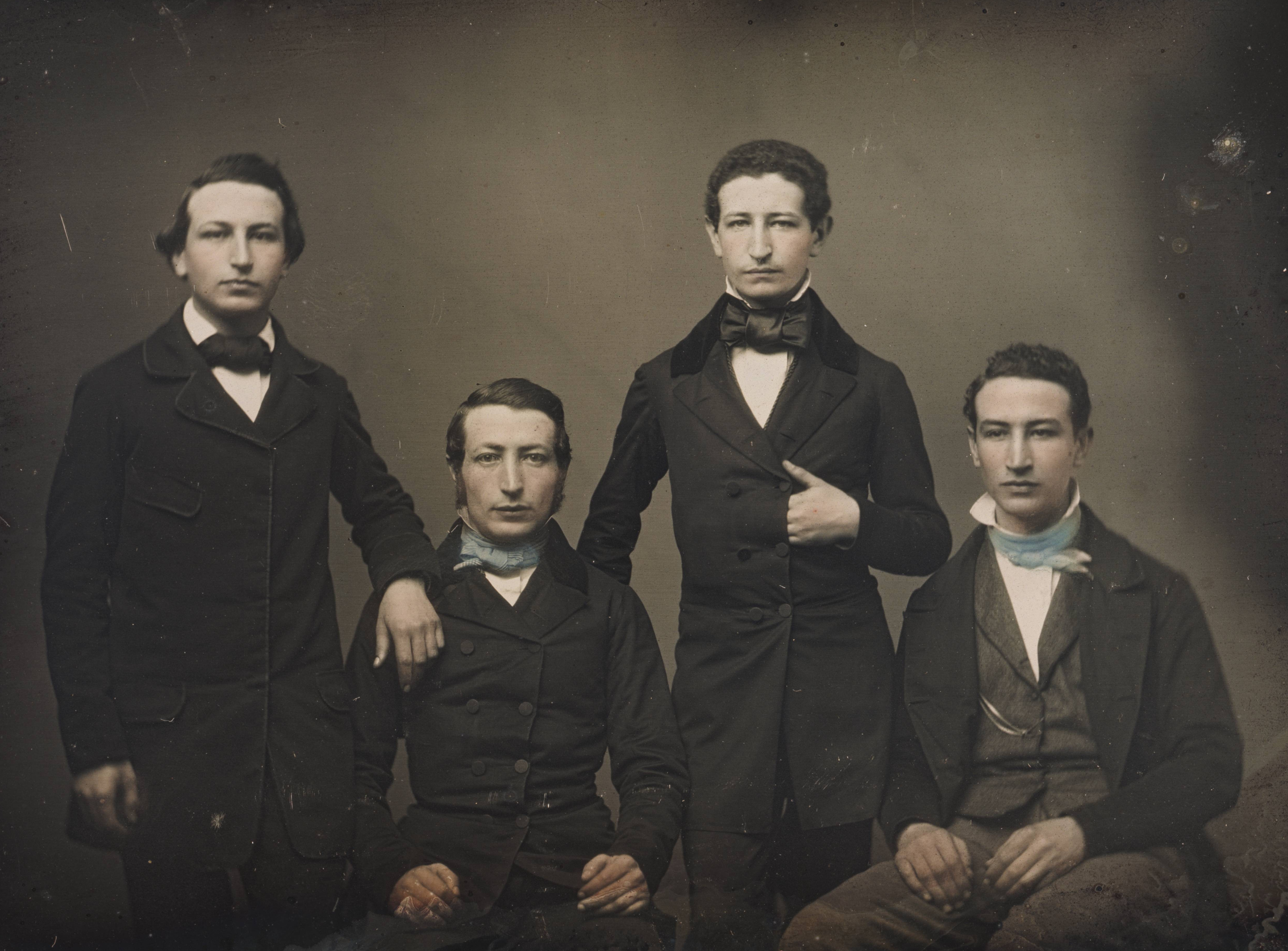
Sutro, his brother, and cousins

Born to a Jewish family in Aachen, Rhine Province, Prussia (today North Rhine-Westphalia, Germany), Sutro was the oldest of eleven children of Rosa (Warendorff) and Emanuel Sutro. He spent his youth working in his father's cloth factory and at school. After his father's death, he and one of his brothers, Sali (né Emanuel Sali Sutro; 1827–1908), began running the cloth factory.

The Prussian rebellion in 1848 caused the family to leave for America in 1850 and settle in Baltimore. Soon after, Adolph left for California and arrived in San Francisco on November 21, 1851. Adolph held a number of positions in San Francisco and eventually owned several tobacco shops.

== Sutro Tunnel ==
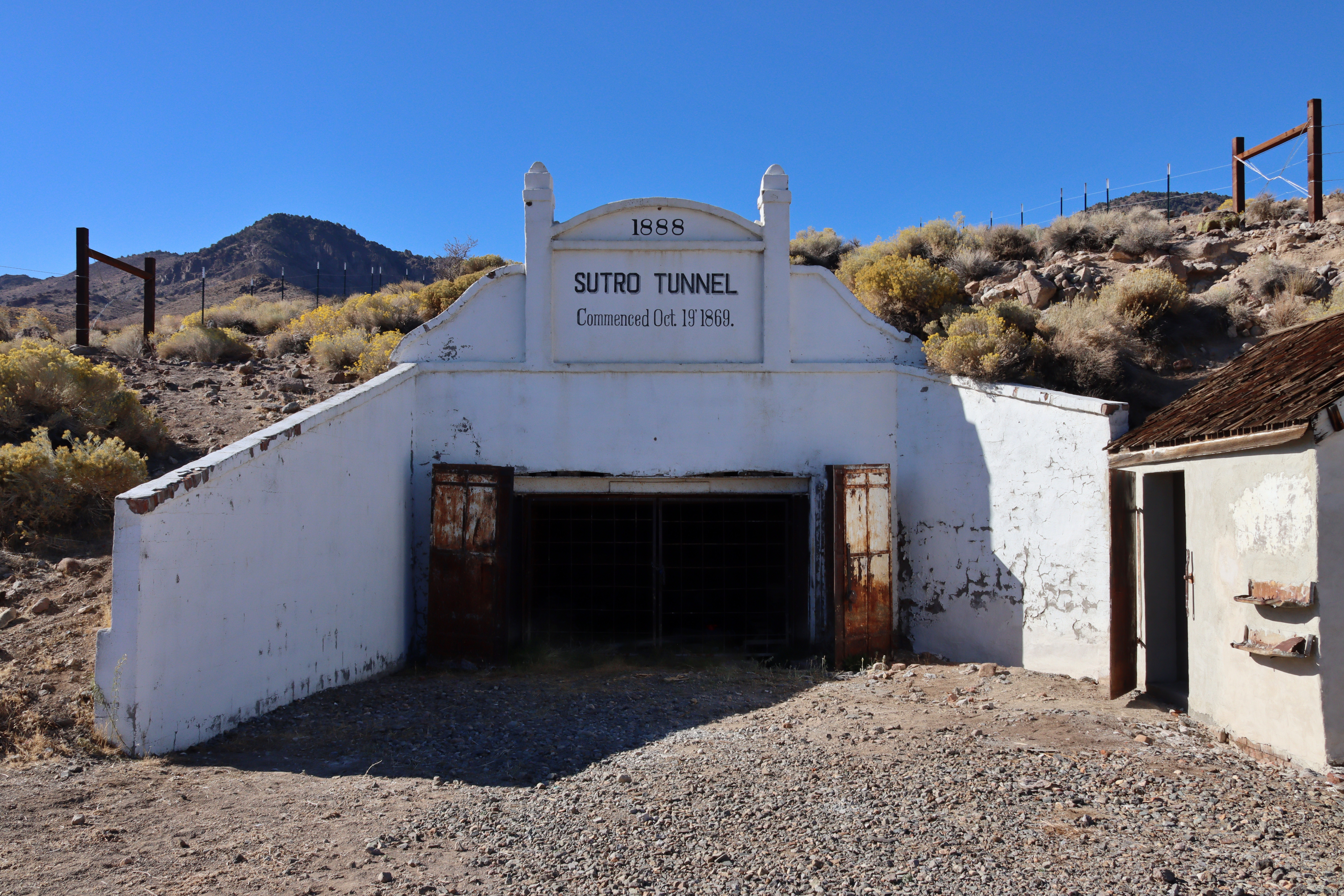
Entrance to Sutro Tunnel

In 1860, Sutro left San Francisco for Virginia City, Nevada after silver was found in the Comstock Lode with plans to continue selling cigars. He soon devised a concept for a tunnel to drain water from the mines and eliminate the threat of flooding. This concept became the Sutro Tunnel.

In 1865 Sutro incorporated the Sutro Tunnel Company and was granted an exclusive charter to build the tunnel by the U.S. Congress in 1866. The project encountered financial difficulties, due in part to William Ralston (1826–1875) of the Bank of California, who originally agreed to finance the project but later rescinded the offer. Over time, Sutro found other investors, including miners in the area. Sutro won miners's support after a disaster at the Yellow Jacket Mine on April 7, 1869, allowing him to lobby the Miner's Union in support of the Sutro Tunnel and begin construction on October 19, 1869.

According to historian Samuel Dickson (né Samuel Benjamin Dinkelspiel; 1889–1974), " ... Sutro set off blasts of dynamite, ... leading the way for tunnel diggers" during the tunnel's construction. The tunnel was completed in 1878 and made Sutro "the King of Comstock" because it could drain four million gallons of water daily and was rented by mine owners at an average of $10,000 a day.

After a year of running the tunnel, Adolph moved back to San Francisco. His brother Theodore Sutro took over the Sutro Tunnel Company. Theodore Sutro sold the Sutro Tunnel Company to Franklin Leonard, Sr., after Adolph's death.

== Adolph Sutro Sculpture ==
On October 19, 2026 the Friends of the Sutro Tunnel dedicated a 9' interpretive sculpture of Adolph Sutro adjacent to the Tunnel's portico.

The bronze sculpture was the creative work of internationally recognized Israeli sculptor and artist, Sam Philipe. It was donated by the Jewish American Society for Historic Preservation.

== Estate, baths, and home ==
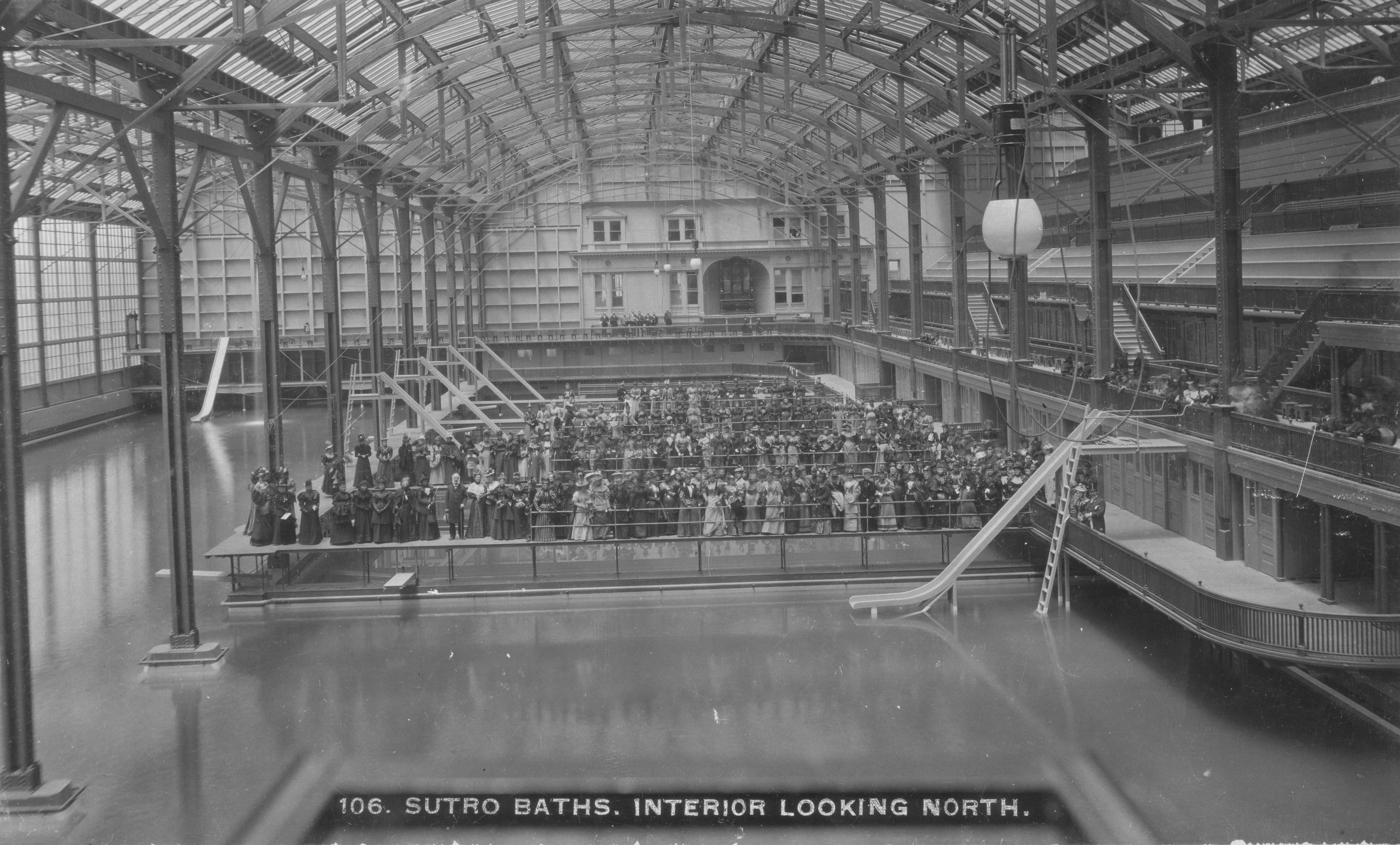
Adolph Sutro & Ladies of National Medical Convention inside the Sutro Baths, June 8, 1894

Sutro's wealth was increased by large real estate investments in San Francisco, where he became an entrepreneur and public figure after returning from the Comstock in 1879. These land investments included Mount Sutro, Land's End (the area where Lincoln Park and the Cliff House are today), and Mount Davidson, which was called "Blue Mountain" at the time.

Sutro invested most of his $900,000 savings on land acquisitions in San Francisco, eventually owning 1/12 of the city: "I took my money and invested in real estate…when everyone was scared and thought the city was going to the dogs. I bought every acre I could lay my hands on until I had 2,200 acres in this city." His largest acquisition was the entire northwestern portion of Rancho San Miguel, which he covered with eucalyptus trees over the years: "The people of the Pacific Coast…will wander through the majestic groves rising from the trees we are now planting, reverencing the memory of those whose foresight clothed the earth with emerald robes and made nature beautiful to look upon." Planting only eucalyptus trees became a controversial issue, as the plant smothered other endemic species and fires rapidly spread. Other lands were rented to the big Italian families that developed large agriculture operations and provided the Colombo Market with daily fresh picks.

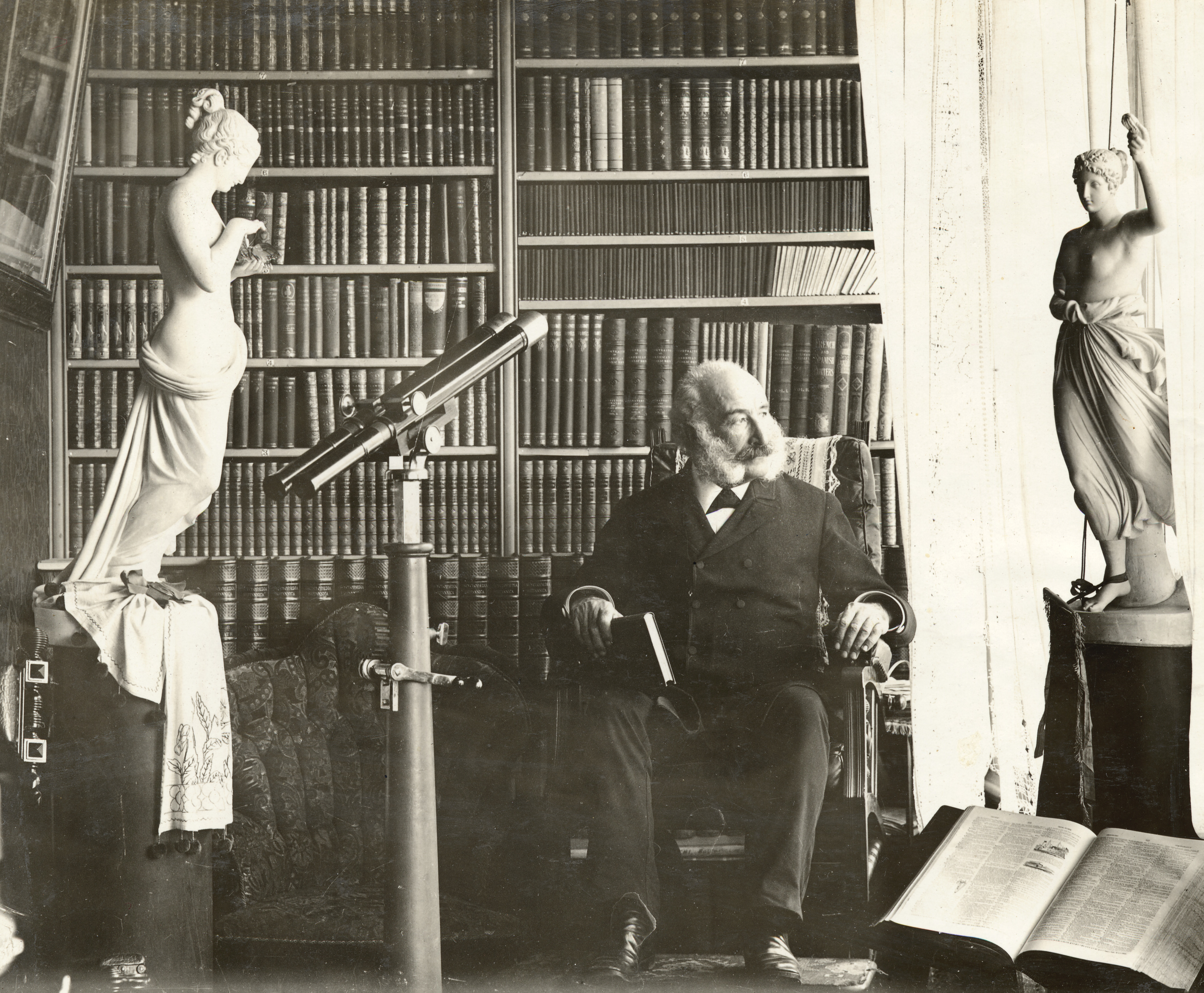
Sutro in his library c. 1890

Sutro opened his own estate to the public and was heralded as a populist for various astute acts of public generosity, such as opening an aquarium and a glass-enclosed entertainment complex called Sutro Baths in the Sutro District. Though the Baths were not opened until 1896, Sutro had been developing and marketing the project for years, attempting four separate times to insulate the site from waves using sea walls, the first three of which collapsed into the Pacific Ocean.

In 1896, Adolph Sutro built a new Cliff House, a seven-story Victorian Chateau, called by some, "the Gingerbread Palace", below his estate on the bluffs of Sutro Heights. This was the same year work began on the famous Sutro Baths, which included six of the largest indoor swimming pools north of the restaurant that included a museum, ice skating rink and other pleasure grounds. Great throngs of San Franciscans arrived on steam trains, bicycles, carts and horse wagons on Sunday excursions.

In 1894, Sutro, in preparation for the opening of the Cliff House, bought a large part of the collection of Woodward's Gardens, a combination zoo, amusement park, aquarium, and art gallery which had closed in 1891.

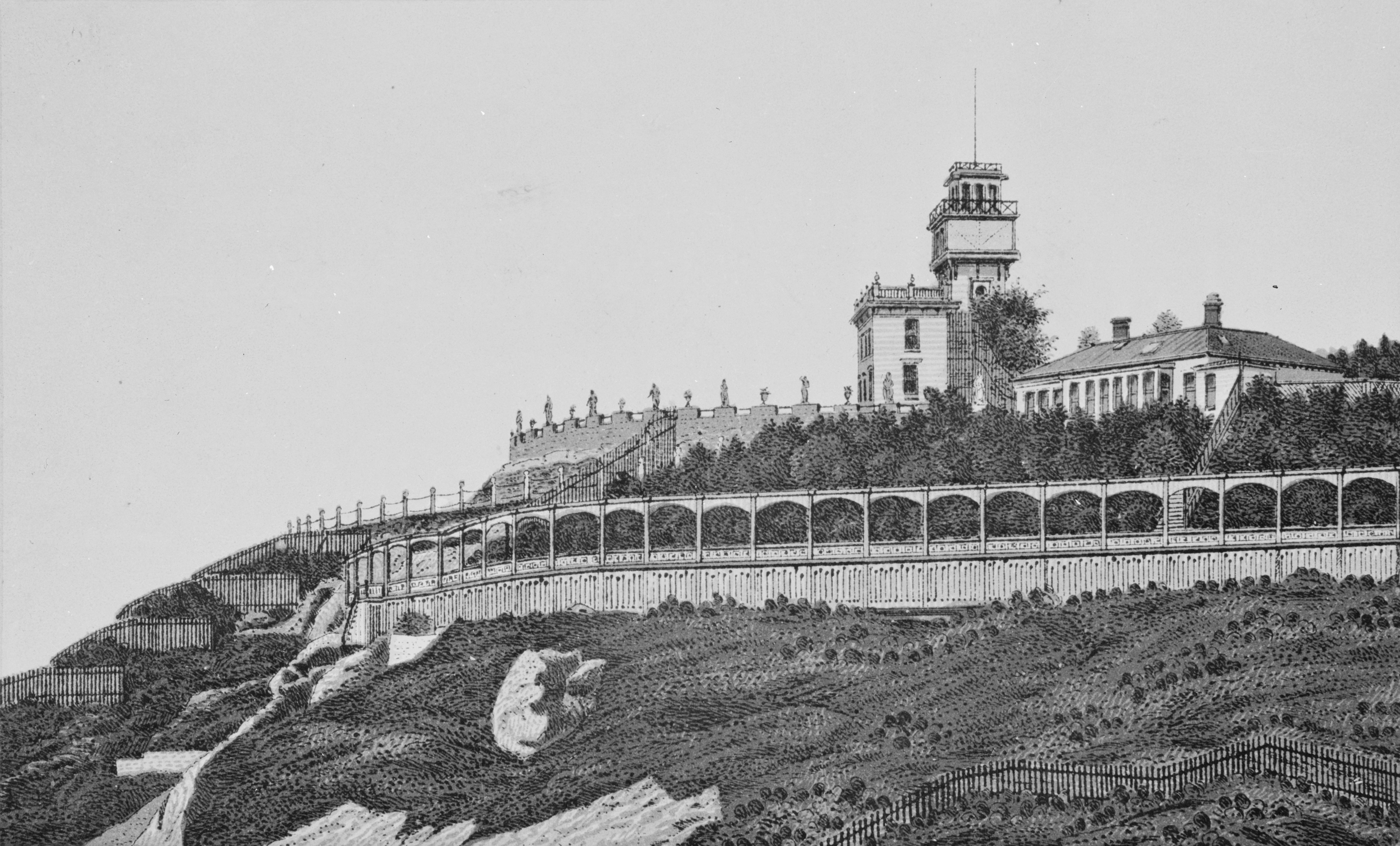
Sutro House

The Baths were saltwater and springwater pools, heated to varying degrees, and surrounded by a concert hall and museums stocked with treasures that Sutro had collected in his travels and from Woodward's Gardens. The baths became very popular despite their remote location, across the open dunes to the west of the populated areas of the city. This popularity was partly due to the low entry fee for visiting the Baths and riding the excursion railroad he built to reach them.

Sutro managed a great increase in the value of his outlying land investments as a direct result of the development burst that his vacationers' railroad spawned. He also increased the value of his lands by planting his property at Mount Sutro with saplings of fast-growing eucalyptus. This occurred at the same time as city Supervisors granted tax-free status to "forested" lands within city limits. Small fragments of the forest still exist. The largest is at Mount Sutro, where 61 acres (25 ha) are the property of the University of California, San Francisco, and another 19 are property of the City of San Francisco.

At his death in 1898, his properties in San Francisco were valued at $3 million.

=== Segregation at the baths ===
The Sutro Baths were segregated in the early years of their operation. In 1897, a black man named John Harris sued the Sutro Baths for refusing him entry because of his race. The case was tried in the San Francisco Superior Court, which ruled in Harris' favor.

=== Destruction of baths ===
A fire destroyed the baths complex in 1966 and all that remains now are ruins. The fire was later determined to be arson. Developers, planning to renovate the complex into apartments, collected the insurance money and abandoned the property.

== Mayor (1894–1896) ==
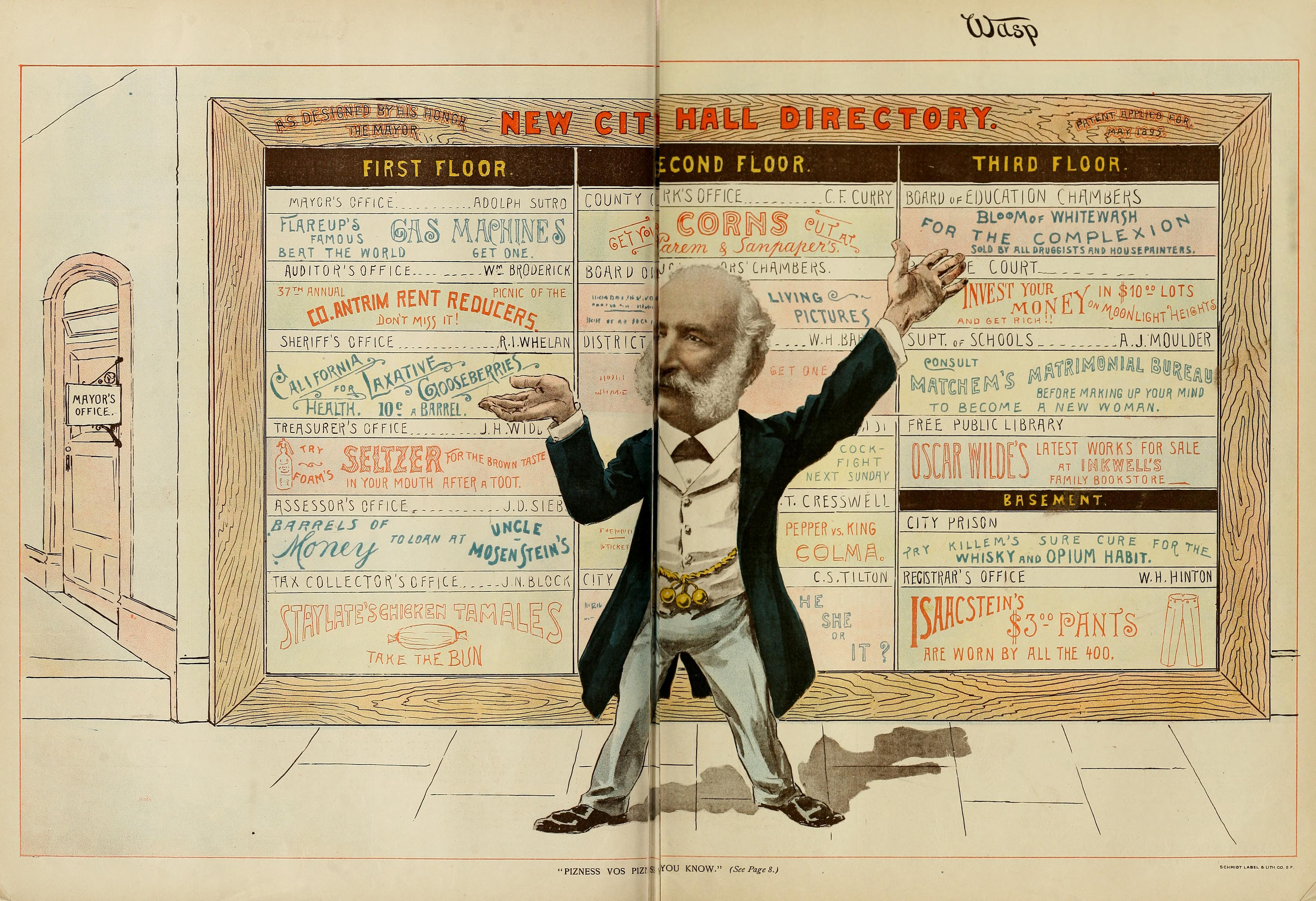
"Pizness Vos Pizness You Know," a caricature of Sutro published in The Wasp, June 1, 1895

Sutro's reputation as a provider of diversions and culture for the average person led the politically weak and radical Populist Party to draft him to run for mayor on their ticket. He won on an anti-big business platform, inveighing against the tight grip that the Southern Pacific Railroad had over local businesses. According to historian Alexander Saxton:

Sutro was not exactly a Populist, but he was enormously popular, and especially with workingmen since he was thought to have defended the honest miner of the Comstock against the "interests." More recently he had served San Francisco as philanthropist on the grand scale and especially had endeared himself by fighting the Southern Pacific's grip on the city streetcar system. Sutro would have won on any ticket, and he was in fact elected by a landslide. It is clear however that his victory represented a non-partisan tribute to a very highly esteemed old man rather than a mass conversion to Populist principle: for while Sutro polled 50 percent of the city's vote, the Populist gubernatorial candidate, J. V. Webster, received only 11 percent, considerably less than his state-wide showing.

Sutro was quickly considered a failed mayor, ill-suited for political work, and did not provide any popularity boost to the Populist party.

Having been in declining health for several years, Sutro died of pneumonia on August 8, 1898 at the age of 68. He left a large fortune in properties, in addition to several unresolved business and legal matters. As a result, protracted court battles over his estate by his heirs would continue for several years.

Many of Sutro's gifts to the city of San Francisco still exist and bear his name, such as Mount Sutro, originally Mount Parnassus (a lower hill nearby is the location of the Sutro Tower), and Sutro Heights and Sutro Heights Park. Sutro Baths was renovated as a skating rink and then was destroyed by an arson fire in 1966. The ruins of the baths (mostly the concrete foundations) still exist just north of the Cliff House. They are part of the Golden Gate National Recreation Area. (1894–1896)

== Family ==
In 1854, Sutro married Leah Harris (1832–1893). They had seven children:

1. Emma Laura Sutro, MD (1855–1938), who on March 27, 1883, married George Washington Merritt, MD (1855–1928)
2. Rose Victoria Sutro (1858–1942), who in 1887 married Count Pio Alberto Morbio (1849–1911). One of their daughters, Marguerite Helen Morbio (1890–1972), had been married from 1916 to 1919 to French Army aviator and nobleman, Count Anselme de Mailly-Châlon (1887–1929), great-grandson of Adrien Augustin Almaric (fr) (1792–1878), Count of Mailly, Marquis of Haucourt and Nesle, prince of Orange
3. Gustav Emmanuel Sutro (1859–1864)
4. Kate Sutro (1862–1913), who married Moritz Nussbaum (1850–1915), an allopathic physician, anatomy scholar and Professor of Biology at the University of Bonn
5. Charles Walter Sutro (1864–1936)
6. Edgar Ernest Sutro (1866–1922)
7. Clara Angela Sutro (1867–1924), who, on December 24, 1898, in Los Angeles, married Chicago attorney William John English (1845–1926), divorced him in 1912, and on July 7, 1915, in Paris, married Count Gilbert de Choiseul-Praslin (1882–1926), grandson of the French nobleman, Charles de Choiseul-Praslin (1805–1847), and son of Marie Elizabeth Forbes (1850–1932) – sister of Henry de Courcy Forbes (1849–1920). Clara and Gilbert divorced in 1921.

Leah filed for divorce from Adolph in 1879 and the two officially separated on July 3, 1880. Shortly after Adolph's death in 1898, Clara Louisa Kluge (1863–1943) claimed to be his widow by way of common law marriage. She retained attorney Van R. Paterson (1849–1902) and prevailed in securing financial support for her two children that she claimed Adolph had fathered:

8. Adolph Newton Sutro (1891–1981), who, in January 1926 in San Bernardino, married Olive Woodward Waibel (1901–1979)
9. Adolphine Charlotte Sutro (1892–1974), who married Elliott Lazier Fullerton (1885–1932)

A brother of Adolph, Otto Sutro (1833–1896), was an organist, conductor, and minor composer who was prominent in music in Baltimore, Maryland. Otto's daughters, Rose Laura Sutro (1870–1957) and Ottilie Sutro (1872–1970), were an internationally acclaimed piano-duo team.

Another brother, Theodore Sutro (1845–1927), a New York City lawyer, married Florence Sutro (née Florence Edith Clinton; 1865–1906), a musician, painter, and founding president of National Federation of Women's Music Clubs on September 18, 1884, in Manhattan.

In New York City in 1874, two brothers of Adolph Sutro, Ludwig and Hugo Sutro, established Sutro Brothers, an enterprise for the manufacture of braids and similar articles, which in time grew to large proportions. Upon the incorporation, in 1888, the firm was renamed Sutro Brothers Braid Company.

Cousins of Adolph Sutro, Charles and Gustav Sutro, founded Sutro & Company, a stockbroking company, in San Francisco in 1858. Sutro & Co. stayed independent until 1986 when it was bought by John Hancock Mutual Life Insurance Co. There it was merged with Tucker Anthony to form Tucker Anthony Sutro, which in turn was bought by Royal Bank of Canada in 2001.

== Portrayal on TV ==
The actor Robert Argent played Sutro in the 1957 episode (season 5, episode 17), "The Man Who Was Never Licked" of the TV show Death Valley Days, hosted by Stanley Andrews. William Hudson was cast in the same episode as Lucky Baldwin, a powerful, 19th-century California businessman.

== See also ==
- Luis Abadiano

== Bibliography ==
- Samuel Dickson, Tales of San Francisco (Stanford University Press, 1957)
