= Sutro Tunnel =

Coordinates: 39°16′48.39″N 119°35′3.6″W

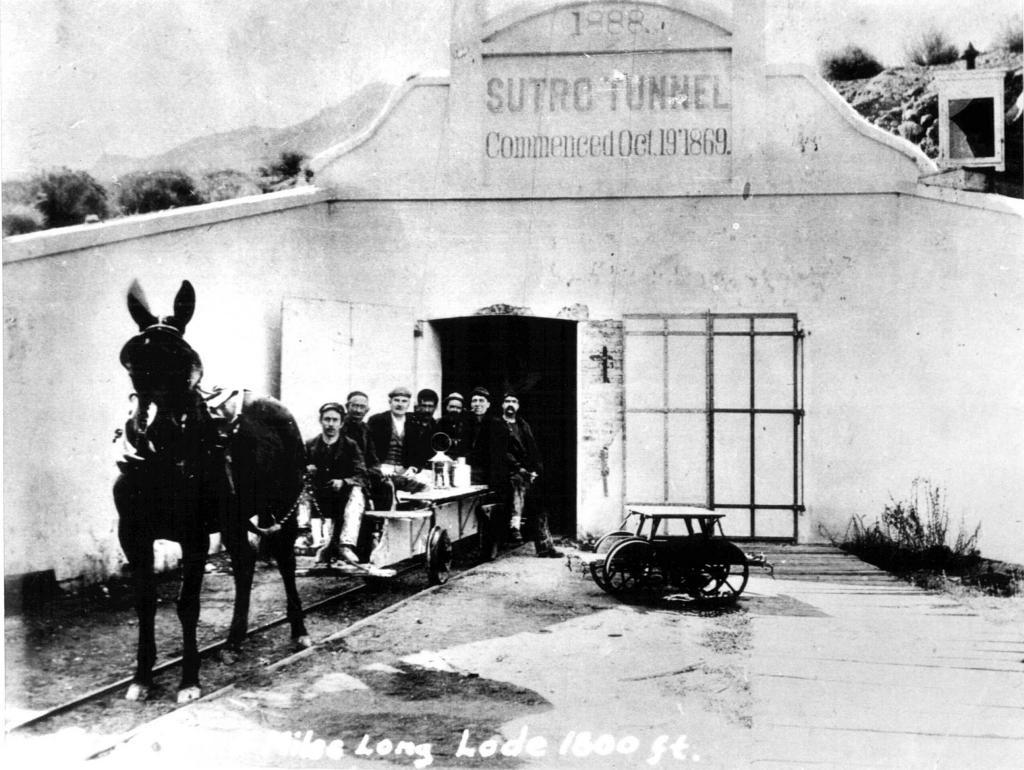
- The entrance to the Sutro Tunnel in the late 1800s
- Interactive map of Sutro Tunnel

Nevada Historical Marker
- Reference no.: 85

The Sutro Tunnel is a drainage tunnel (adit) connected to the Comstock Lode in Northern Nevada. It begins at Dayton, Nevada, and connects 3.88 miles (6.24 km) Northwest to the Savage mine in Virginia City, Nevada. The Sutro Tunnel pioneered the excavation of large drainage and access tunnels in the US. Later US mine drainage tunnels included the Argo Tunnel at Idaho Springs, Colorado, the Leadville and Yak tunnels at Leadville, Colorado, and the Roosevelt tunnel in the Cripple Creek district, Colorado.

== History ==
The tunnel was proposed by Adolph Sutro, a Prussian Jewish mining entrepreneur, in 1860. He promoted the drainage tunnel to allow access to deeper mineral exploration in the Comstock. Flooding and inadequate pumps had inhibited some exploration until that time.

By 1865, Sutro's idea had gained the approval of the state and US federal governments. The mining interests of the Comstock initially supported the project, but later opposed the idea. They feared that an alternate access point to the Comstock minerals would threaten their monopoly on the mining and milling of gold and silver in the Comstock.

Nonetheless, Sutro formed the Sutro Tunnel Company, selling stock certificates to raise funds for its construction, which began in 1869. Financing also came from local miners motivated by the prospect of improved mine safety. This motivation was further advocated by Sutro after the Yellowjacket mine disaster where dozens of miners were burned to death because they could not escape.

Arthur De Wint Foote worked on the tunnel in 1873, but was fired in 1874, having struck a flood of water in Shaft No. 2.

The main tunnel connected to the Savage Mine in 1878, the North and South branches were completed in 1879. Water was released from the mines on June 30 of 1879. Upon completion, Adolph Sutro sold his interest in the tunnel company. However, he stayed on as a board member and moved to San Francisco, later becoming mayor, building the Sutro Baths and much more. Adolph's brother Theodore Sutro then took over control of the Sutro Tunnel Company until 1894 when he then sold it to Franklin Leonard Sr.

== Friends of Sutro ==
The Friends of Sutro Tunnel organization is working to preserve this significant part of Nevada's mining history by restoring the Sutro Tunnel and Site. The goal of the project is to not only preserve the site's historical integrity, but to also make it safe and accessible for visitors. Phase One of the project is currently underway with the focus being on rebuilding the tunnel, ongoing site cleanup, and protecting remaining structures from further deterioration.

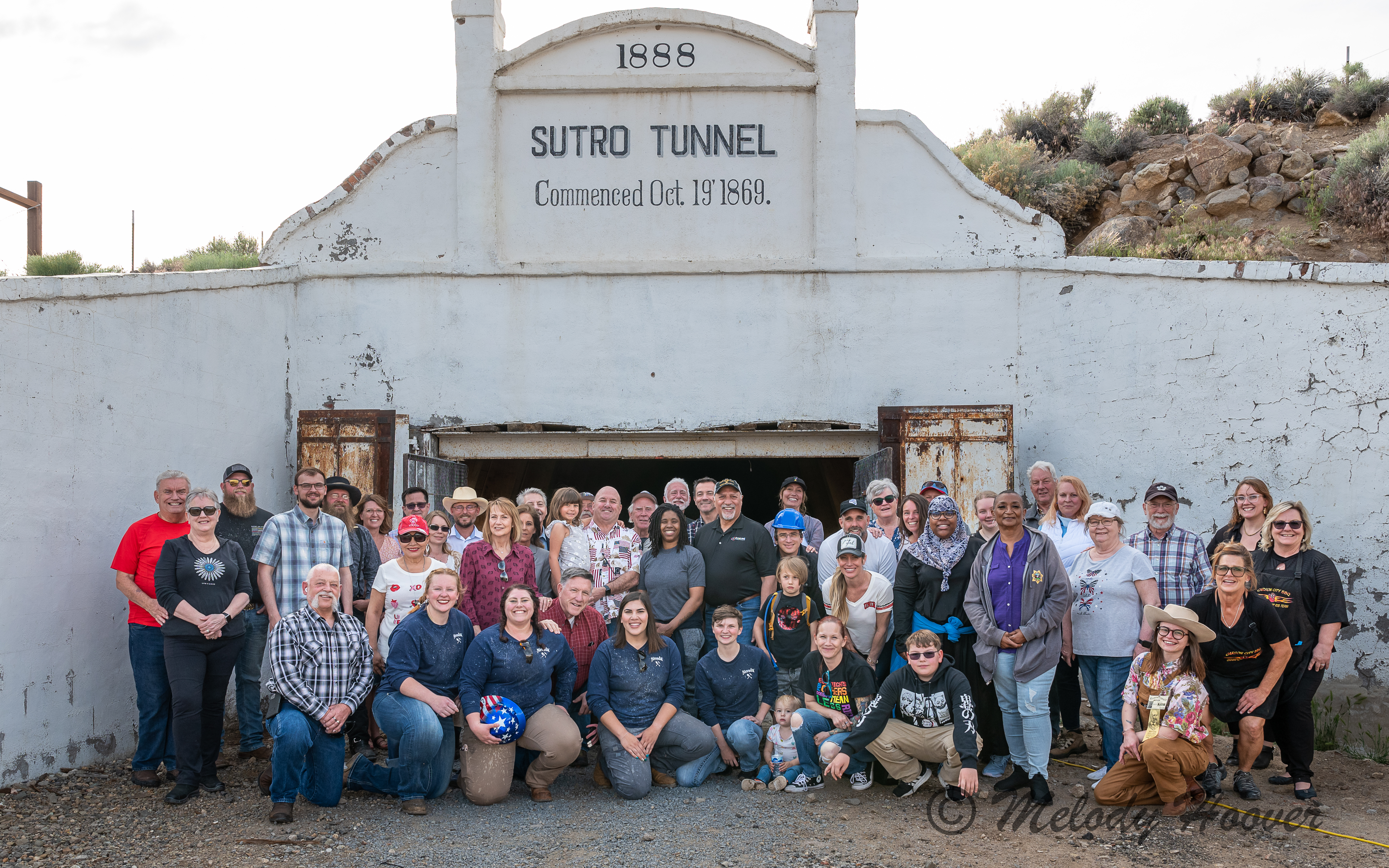
Nevada Lawmakers visiting the Sutro Tunnel to see the work that the Friends of Sutro Tunnel have done to preserve and restore this significant part of Nevada's history.

== Adolph Sutro Sculpture ==
On October 19, 2026 the Friends of the Sutro Tunnel dedicated a 9' interpretive sculpture of Adolph Sutro adjacent to the Tunnel's portico.

The bronze sculpture was the creative work of internationally recognized Israeli sculptor and artist, Sam Philipe. It was donated by the Jewish American Society for Historic Preservation.

== In popular culture ==
Mark Twain references the tunnel in Roughing It. Wallace Stegner also references the tunnel in Angle of Repose.

| Preceded by Jedediah Strong Smith | Nevada Historical Markers; 85 | Succeeded by Tule Springs Archaeological Site |
