= Robert Naify =

American businessperson (d.2016)

Robert Naify was an American businessman and motion picture and media tycoon known for his ownership of the movie theaters chain United Artists Theatres, the largest and most geographically diverse theatre circuit in the United States, today part of Regal Cinemas. He also founded the cable company United Artists Communications Inc and post-production and sound mixing firm Todd-AO. He lived in San Francisco, California until his death on April 7, 2016 at the age of 94.

== Career ==
Naify, the son of a Lebanese immigrant who built a movie theater empire beginning in 1912, has worked in the theater business nearly all his life. His father got into movie business in Atlantic City with a movie theater in 1912 where Robert and brother Marshall Naify (d. 2000) started as ushers, projectionists. The Naify brothers built the first movie screen in San Francisco, the New Fillmore Theatre and The Clay, which was first a nickelodeon house and one of the oldest theaters in San Francisco.They then moved to California in the early 1920s and built more theaters, including the Cascade Theatre.

During the 1920s, the Naify brothers also acquired the San Francisco Theaters owned by Samuel H Levin. These theaters were the Balboa, Alexandria, Coliseum, Vogue Metro, the Harding, and Coronet, which was opened in 1949. In 1988, UA bought the Philadelphia-based Sameric chain of about 30 locations in PA, NJ, and DE. The UA Theaters main office was in San Francisco until 1988 when it was sold to TCI. Thereafter, it was relocated to Englewood, CO.

=== United Artists Theaters ===
After Inheriting movie theater empire Golden State Theaters, they purchased the United Artists Theaters chain. UA Theaters (established in 1924) has its roots in the movie studio of the same name founded by Douglas Fairbanks, Mary Pickford, Charlie Chaplin, and D. W. Griffith, but legally has always been separate from it. The company became the nation's largest owner of movie theaters, with 2,050 screens and later sold it in 1986 to John Malone's Tele-communications Inc. for cash, TCI stock. United Artists Theaters is now part of the Regal Entertainment Group, the largest movie theater chain in America.

=== United Artists Communications, Inc. ===
Just as they were in the theater business, the Naify brothers were also pioneers in the cable business. United Artists Communications Inc. was an early pioneer in cable television, and aggressively bought smaller regional systems. UAC became one of the nation's largest cable companies before merging with TCI. By the end of the 1980s, John Malone's Tele-Communications, Inc. was majority owner; on June 8, 1991, it purchased the remainder of the company. Then on February 19, 1992, TCI sold the theater chain in a leveraged buyout led by Merrill Lynch Capital Partners Inc and UA management. TCI became a unit of AT&T Corp in 1999, whose cable television assets were later acquired by Charter Communications and then Comcast Corporation.

=== Todd-AO ===
In the mid-1950s, the Naify brothers were also the founders of the Todd-AO post-production company, along with Mike Todd and the American Optical Company. Todd-AO became the largest independent post-production sound studio in the United States and worked on Apollo 13, E.T, Saving Private Ryan, Gladiator, Braveheart and other major films.

In 1957, the Todd-AO Corporation won an Academy Award for Academy Scientific and Technical Award for its Todd-AO system. The company's employees have won more than 20 Academy Awards and more than 40 Emmy Awards; the talent and comprehensive services of Todd-AO and its subsidiaries attract such acclaimed producer/director clients as Steven Spielberg, Ron Howard, Woody Allen, and Robert Altman. The Walt Disney Company and its affiliates account for more than 15% of Todd-AO's revenues. Todd-AO maintains facilities worldwide, in Los Angeles, New York City, Atlanta, London, and Barcelona.

The Todd-AO Corporation is famous for providing a wide range of post production services to the motion picture, television, and commercial advertising industries. Renowned for sound engineering, the company's services include editing, narration, rerecording, digital sweetening, sound and picture synchronization, music scoring, Automated Dialogue Replacement, Foley sound effects, content transfer, and vaulting/storage. Moreover, the company's video services include editing, graphics in 2D or 3D, visual effects, color correction, film-to-video transfer (telecine), and vaulting/storage. Finally, its distribution and studio services for home video, pay television, cable, and domestic and international television companies include foreign language dubbing, subtitling, restoration, satellite downlink, Digital TV, Digital Versatile Disc (DVD) services, transmission of television channels, and format conversions.

By the time Todd-AO became a public company on the Nasdaq stock exchange in 1987, United Artists Communications, Inc. (UACI) ownership in Todd-AO had reached 85%. Robert and Marshall Naify obtained a 52% majority ownership in Todd-AO stock through the public offering and subsequently sold their majority interest in UACI. Marshall Naify had been the CEO of the firm for more than 40 years before they sold it to Malone's Liberty Media in 1999.

The Naify brothers have been members of The Forbes 400 since 1987, with an estimated worth of $4.3 billion.
