= List of theatres in San Francisco =

This is a list of theatres and live performance venues in San Francisco, California. For more information on theater in San Francisco, see Culture of San Francisco - Theater.

== Theatres in San Francisco ==
Name	Address	Neighborhood	Seats	Notes
Alcazar Theatre	650 Geary Street	Tenderloin	511	
Bayfront Theatre	Fort Mason Center			home of BATS Improv
Bayview Opera House	4705 Third Street	Bayview	300	
Beverly Hills Playhouse of San Francisco	414 Mason Street	Union Square		theater and acting school
Bill Graham Civic Auditorium	99 Grove Street	Civic Center	7000	
Bimbo's 365 Club	1025 Columbus Ave.	North Beach		music venue
Bindlestiff Studio	185 6th Street	South of Market	80	Filipino American performing arts center
Bottom of the Hill	1233 17th Street	Potrero Hill		music venue
Brava Theatre Center	2781 24th Street	Mission District	360	dedicated to the expression of women, people of color, youth, LGBTQ and others
Brick and Mortar Music Hall	1710 Mission Street	Mission District		music venue
Cartwright Hotel on Union Square	Pacific Heights Room, 524 Sutter Street	Union Square	80	
Castro Theatre	429 Castro Street	Castro District	1400	primarily a movie house, but also used for live special events
Chancellor Hotel Theatre	433 Powell Street	Union Square		hosts the San Francisco Magic Parlor
The Chapel	777 Valencia Street	Mission District		music venue
Club Fugazi	678 Green Street	North Beach	400	formerly hosted Beach Blanket Babylon
Cobb's Comedy Club	915 Columbus Ave.	North Beach		
Cort Theatre	64 Ellis Street	Tenderloin	1,845	Had several names. Cort Theatre from 1911-1918. Curran Theatre from 1918-1921. Century Theatre in 1921-1922. Briefly Morosco Theatre for a few months in 1922, only to become the Century Theatre again from November 1922 until June 1923 when it was rebranded the Capitol Theatre. It remained the Capitol Theatre until it was demolished in 1941.
CounterPulse	80 Turk Street	Tenderloin		previously at 1310 Mission Street
Cowell Theatre	Fort Mason Center		437	venue for the New Pickle Circus
Creativity Theater	Children's Creativity Museum, 221 4th Street	South of Market	200	formerly Zeum Theater, located in Yerba Buena Gardens
Custom Made Theatre	414 Mason Street	Union Square	99	intimate setting for modern plays and musicals, previously at 533 Sutter Street
Curran Theatre (opened 1922)	445 Geary Street	Tenderloin		For the older Curran Theatre (1918-1921) see Cort Theatre entry.
Dance Mission Theater	3316-24th Street	Mission District		
Diego Rivera Theatre	City College of San Francisco, 50 Frida Kahlo Way	Sunnyside		home of the mural Pan American Unity by Diego Rivera
Feinstein's at the Nikko	222 Mason Street	Union Square		music venue and nighclub
Fillmore Auditorium	1805 Geary Blvd.	Fillmore District	1,315	music venue with standing room
Gateway Theatre	215 Jackson Street	Embarcadero		venue for the 42nd Street Moon, and frequent venue for Theatre Rhinoceros; formerly the Eureka Theatre
Geary Theater	415 Geary Street	Tenderloin		venue for the American Conservatory Theater
Golden Gate Theatre	1 Taylor Street	Tenderloin		built in 1922, and once housed vaudeville acts; owned by SHN
Gough Street Playhouse	1620 Gough Street	Cathedral Hill	50	venue for the Custom Made Theatre Co.
Grace Cathedral	1100 California Street	Nob Hill		hosts concerts and events
Grand Theater	Gray Area Foundation for the Arts, 2665 Mission Street	Mission District		former movie theater, now used for live performances
Great American Music Hall	859 O'Farrell Street	Little Saigon		
Great Star Theater	636 Jackson Street	Chinatown	438	music and event venue; previously 55 Taylor Street, and 923 Market Street
Herbst Theatre	San Francisco War Memorial and Performing Arts Center, 401 Van Ness	Civic Center	928	
The Independent	628 Divisadero Street			music venue in the Harding Theater building
Intersection for the Arts	1446 Market Street	Civic Center		established in 1965, the oldest alternative non-profit art space in the city
Lorraine Hansberry Theatre	762 Fulton Street	Western Addition		African-American theatre
Louise M. Davies Symphony Hall	San Francisco War Memorial and Performing Arts Center, 201 Van Ness Street	Civic Center		venue of the San Francisco Symphony
Joe Goode Annex	Project Artaud, 401 Alabama Street	Mission District		
Marines Memorial Theater	609 Sutter Street	Lower Nob Hill		
Marrakech Magic Theatre	419 O'Farrell Street	Tenderloin		featuring the magic of Peter Morrison
The Marsh	1062 Valencia Street	Mission District		specializes in developing new performances
Theatre at MCCLA	Mission Cultural Center for Latino Arts	Mission District	150	
New Conservatory Theatre Center	25 Van Ness Ave.	Civic Center		
NOHSpace	Project Artaud, 2840 Mariposa Street	Mission District		venue of Theatre of Yugen
SF Masonic Auditorium	1111 California Street	Nob Hill	3,481	formerly known as Grand Masonic Auditorium and Nob Hill Masonic Auditorium
Nourse Theater	275 Hayes Street	Civic Center	1,693	venue of City Arts and Lectures
Oasis	298 11th Street	South of Market		drag theater and cabaret
ODC Theater	351 Shotwell Street	Mission District		dance performances
Orpheum Theatre	1192 Market Street	Tenderloin	2,197	built in 1926 and owned by SHN
Palace of Fine Arts Theatre	Palace of Fine Arts, 3301 Lyon Street	Marina District	960	originally constructed for the 1915 Panama-Pacific Exposition, has since been rebuilt, renovated and seismically retrofitted
Peña Pachamama	1630 Powell Street	North Beach		Bolivian restaurant and Latin dance shows
Phoenix Theatre	414 Mason Street	Union Square	49	two stages: the 6th Floor Theatre, and The Annex
Presidio Theatre	99 Moraga Avenue	Presidio		
Punch Line	444 Battery Street	Financial District		comedy club
Regency Center	1290 Sutter Street	Lower Nob Hill	1,423	music venue with four stages; the main stage is the Regency Ballroom
Safehouse Arts	145 Eddy Street	Tenderloin		formerly known as SAFEhouseARTS
San Francisco Conservatory of Music	50 Oak Street	Civic Center		includes three performance halls (Concert Hall, Recital Hall, and Osher Salon)
San Francisco Jazz Center	201 Franklin Street	Hayes Valley		
San Francisco Playhouse	450 Post Street	Union Square	199	traveling theater company that performs political musicals
South of Market Cultural Center	934 Brannan Street	South of Market		managed by SOMArts
Strand Theater	American Conservatory Theater, 1127 Market Street	Civic Center		
Theatre du Lycée Français de San Francisco (TLF)	Lycee Francais de San Francisco, 1201 Ortega Street	Sunset District	325	
Venetian Room	Fairmont San Francisco	Nob Hill		venue for cabaret performances, and where Tony Bennett first sang, "I Left My Heart in San Francisco"
Victoria Theatre	2961-16th Street	Mission District		plays, live concerts, film festivals, musicals, and other kinds of events
Walt Disney Family Museum Theater	Presidio Main Post	Presidio		
The Warfield	982 Market Street	Civic Center		large music venue
War Memorial Opera House	San Francisco War Memorial and Performing Arts Center, 301 Van Ness Street	Civic Center		venue of the San Francisco Opera and San Francisco Ballet
Yerba Buena Center for the Arts	701 Mission Street			includes the Novelius/YBCA Theatre or Blue Shield of California Theater
Z Space	Project Artaud, 450 Florida Stree	Mission District		home of the theatre company of the same name, with a main stage, and the smaller Z Below theater

== Former theatres ==
- Alexandria Theater (1923–2004) 5400 Geary Boulevard
- Amado's (c. 2015–2023), formerly known as Viracocha (2010–2015), 998 Valencia Street in the Mission District; Viracocha was an underground music venue, and Amado's was later a licensed venue
- Balancoire, 2565 Mission Street; restaurant, bar, club with live performances in the Mission District
- Center for Sex & Culture, 1349 Mission Street; hosted live theater and other events in South of Market
- Coronet Theatre (1949–2005) 3575 Geary Boulevard
- The Dark Room Theatre (2008–2015), 2263 Mission Street
- El Capitan Theatre and Hotel, 2353 Mission Street; Mission District
- EXIT Theatre, 156 Eddy Street
- Grand Opera House (San Francisco)
- The Hypnodrome (?–2017), 575 10th Street; once home of The Thrillpeddlers company
- Imperial Palace restaurant, 818 Washington Street; formerly hosted Tony n' Tina's Wedding in Chinatown
- Inner Mission theater and event space at 2050 Bryant Street in the Mission, home of Theater MadCap
- Kelly Cullen Community Auditorium, 220 Golden Gate Avenue; hosts productions by Theater of Others
- Market Street Cinema (1912–2013), 1077 Market Street
- Metro Theatre (1924–2006), 2055 Union Street
- Mojo Theatre, in the Redstone Building at 2940 16th Street, in the Mission District
- Northpoint Theatre (1967–1997), 2290 Powell Street in North Beach
- New Musical Theater of San Francisco, Inc., a non-profit that produced original musicals
- PianoFight, 144 Taylor Street
- Royce Gallery, 2901 Mariposa Street; historic warehouse performance venue in the Mission District
- Ruby Skye, 420 Mason Street; nightclub and special events venue, formerly the Stage Door Theatre
- Stage Werx Theatre, 446 Valencia Street, Mission District theatre hosts live performances, comedy, solo performance, music, and movies
- Supperclub, 657 Harrison Street, South of Market
- Teatro ZinZanni, cirque, comedy, and cabaret theater; without a venue, but seeking to return to the San Francisco waterfront
- Theatre 39 at Pier 39, Beach Street at Embarcadero
- Tides Theatre, 533 Sutter Street, 2nd floor; 99-seat theater in Union Square
- Un-Scripted Theater Company, 533 Sutter Street, 2nd floor; 49-seat improv theater in Union Square
- Variety Preview Room (or The Preview Room), Hobart Building at 582 Market Street
- Yoshi's San Francisco, jazz club at 1330 Fillmore Street

== Theatre gallery ==
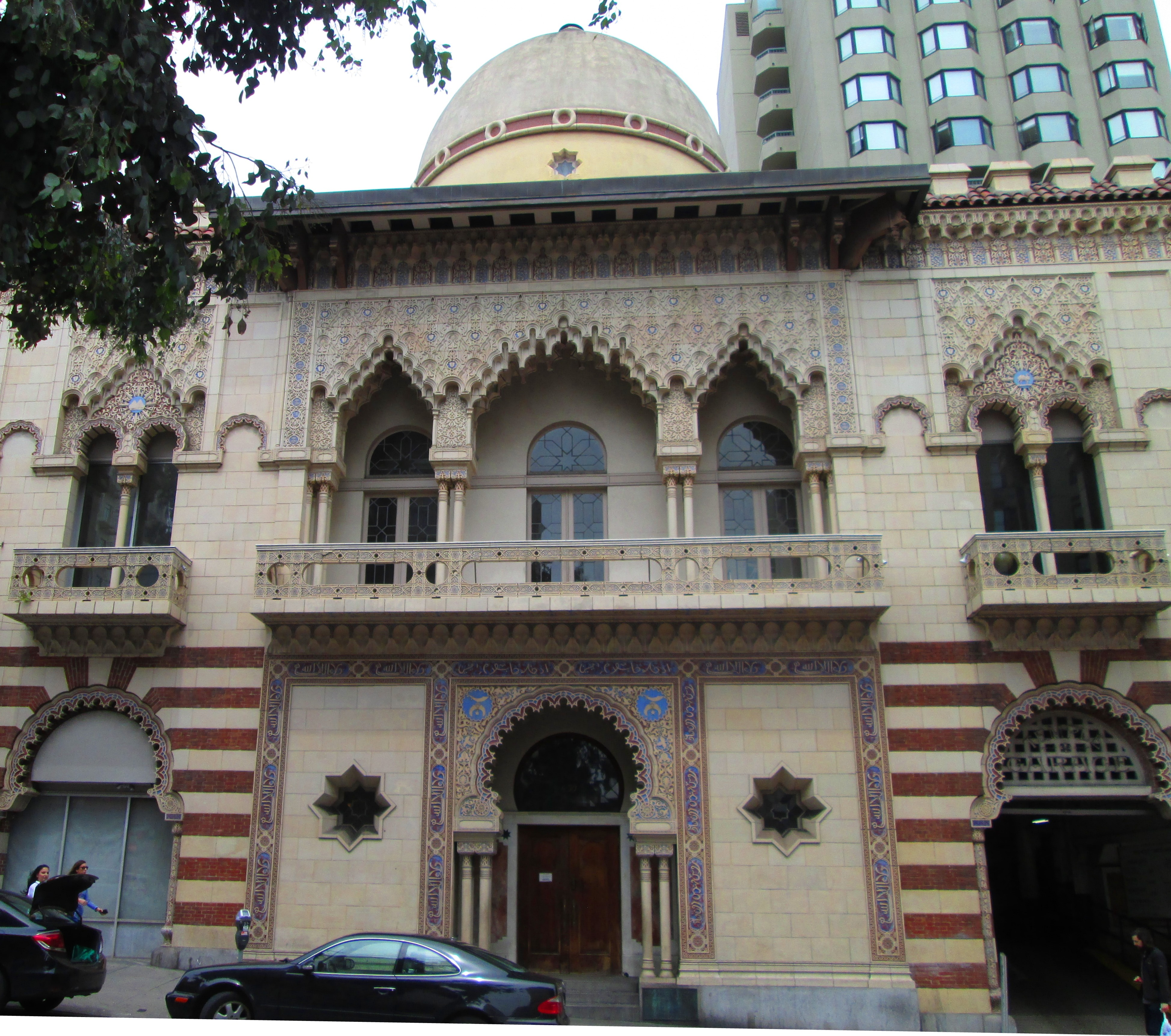
Alcazar Theatre

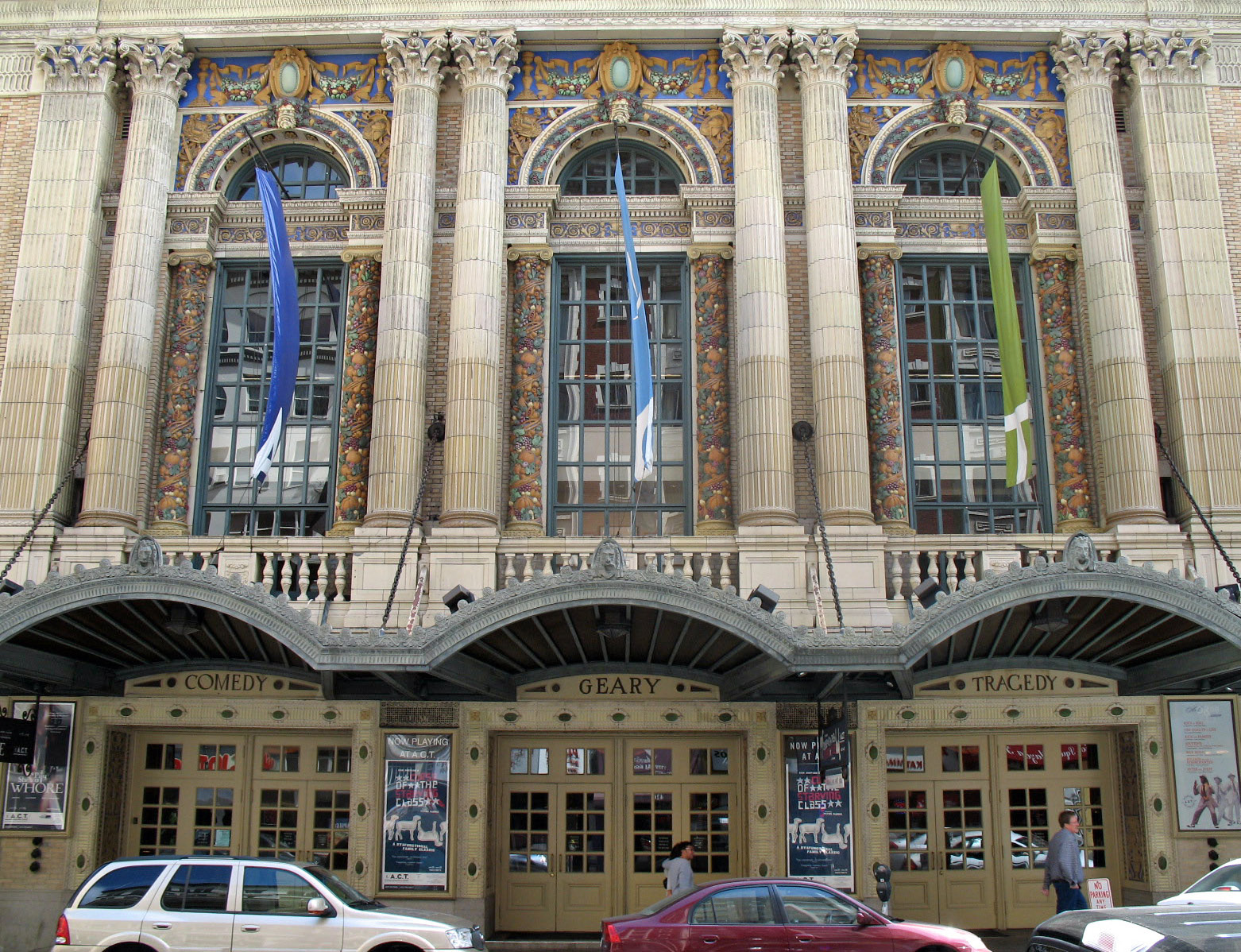
Geary Theater, home of American Conservatory Theater

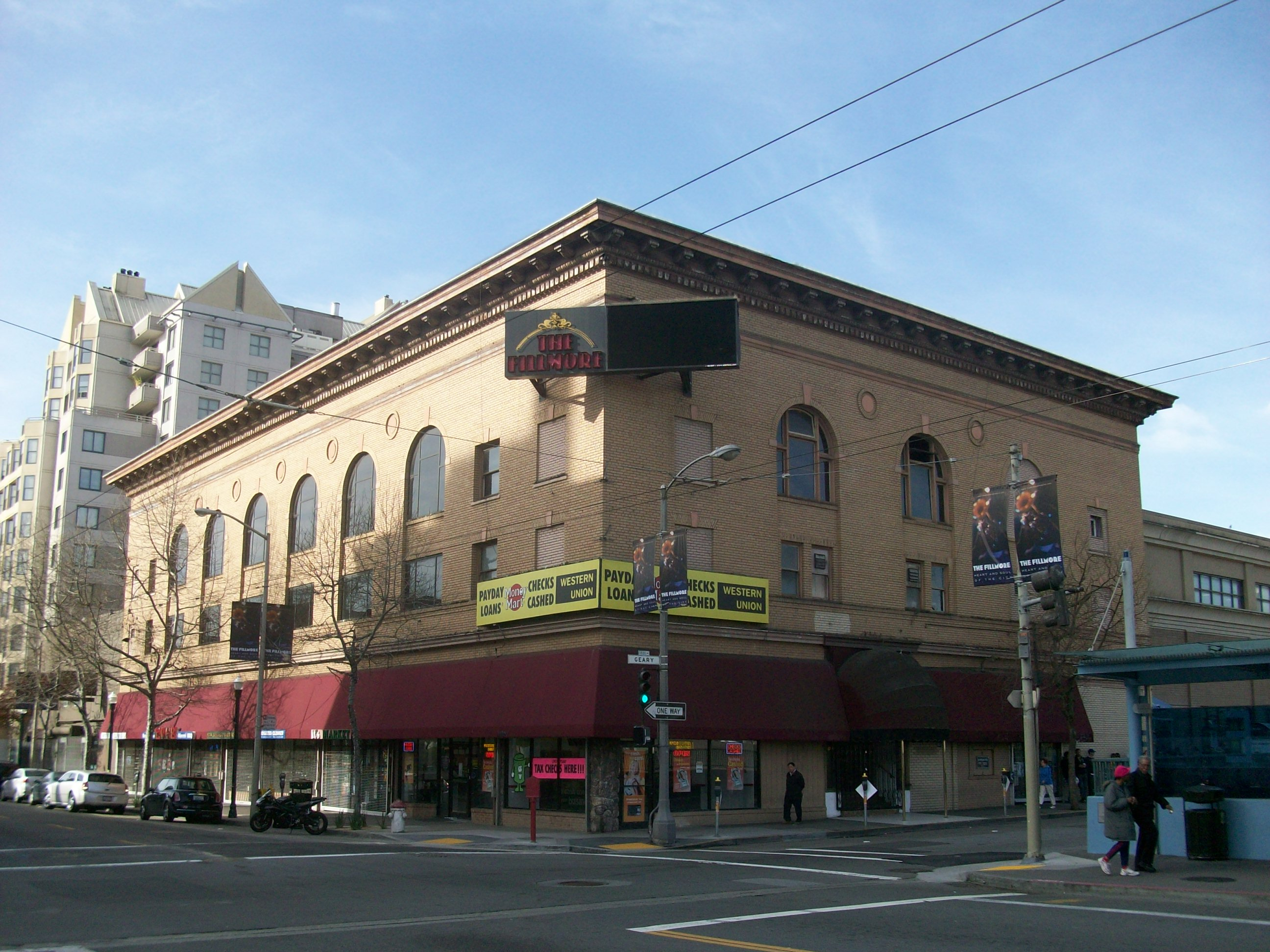
The Fillmore Auditorium, made famous by Bill Graham

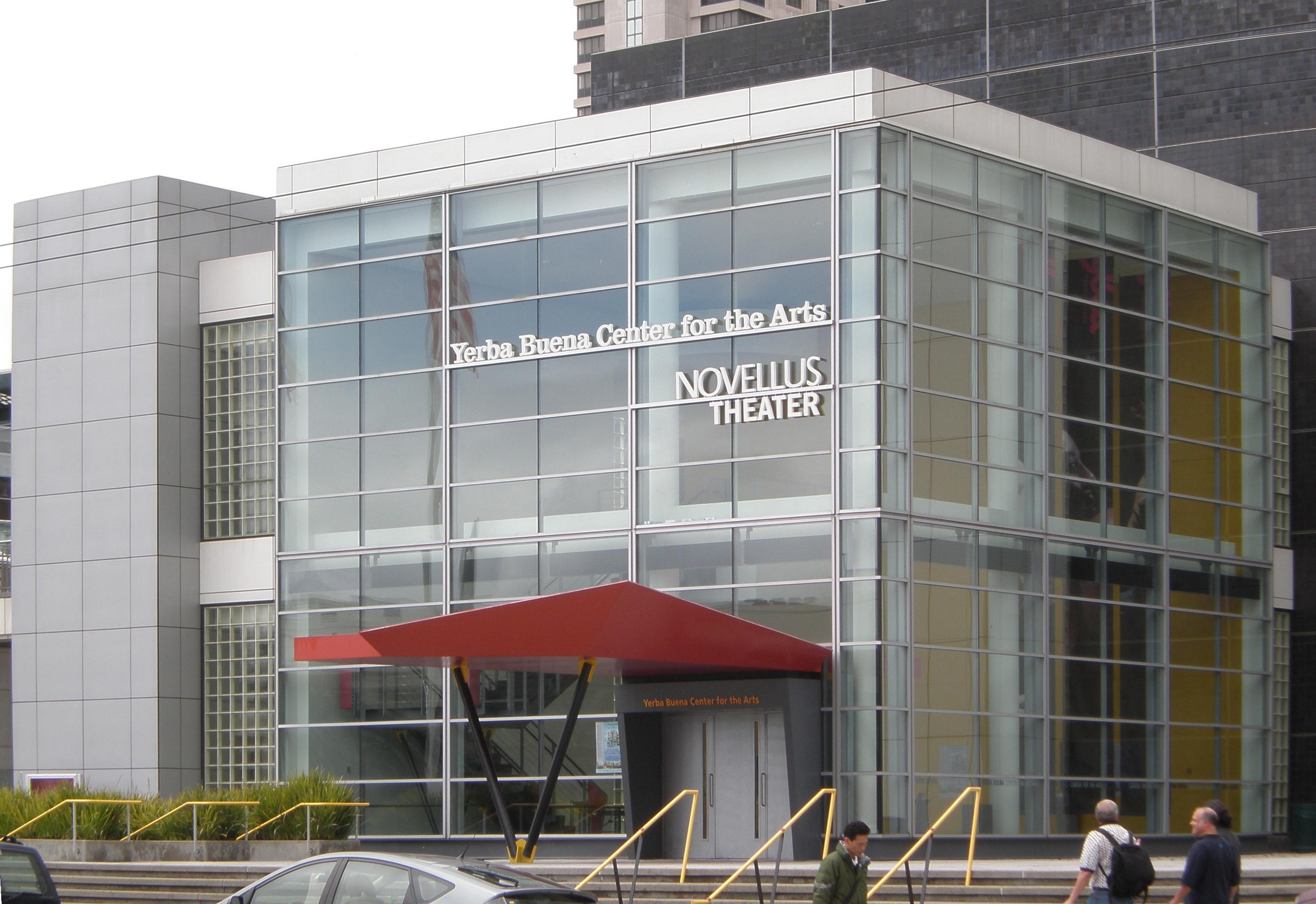
The Yerba Buena Center for the Arts Novellus Theatre

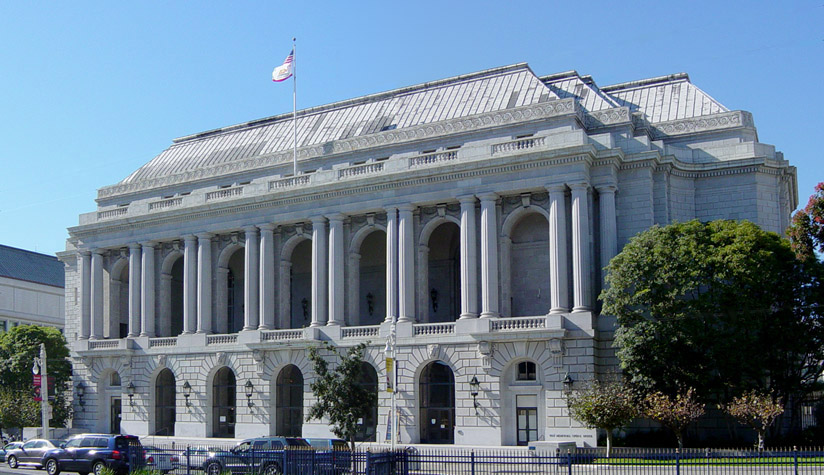
War Memorial Opera House, home of San Francisco Opera and San Francisco Ballet

== See also ==
- Theatre Bay Area
- Theater District (San Francisco, California)
- San Francisco Mime Troupe, traveling theater company that performs political musicals
