= List of Brockhampton concerts =

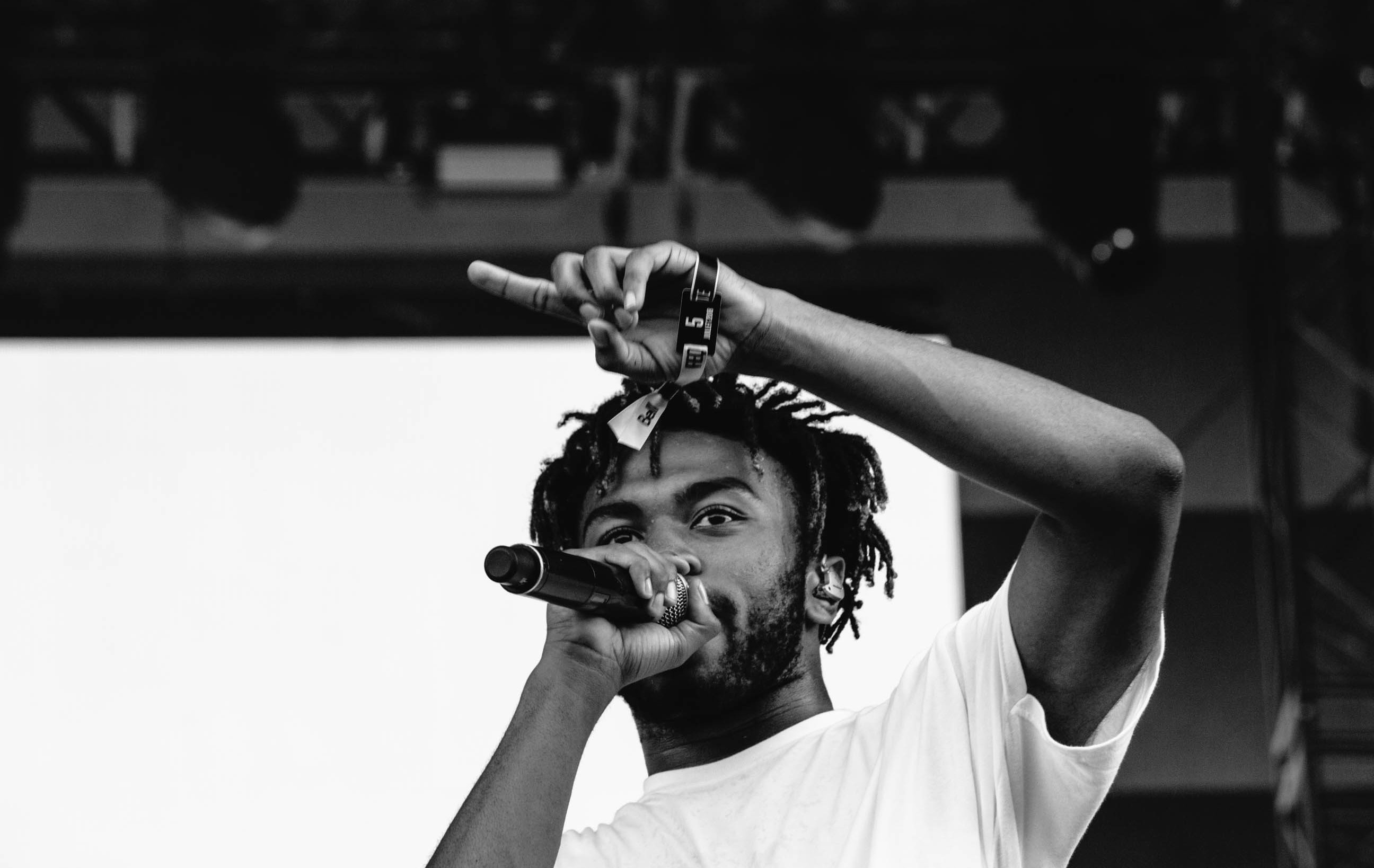
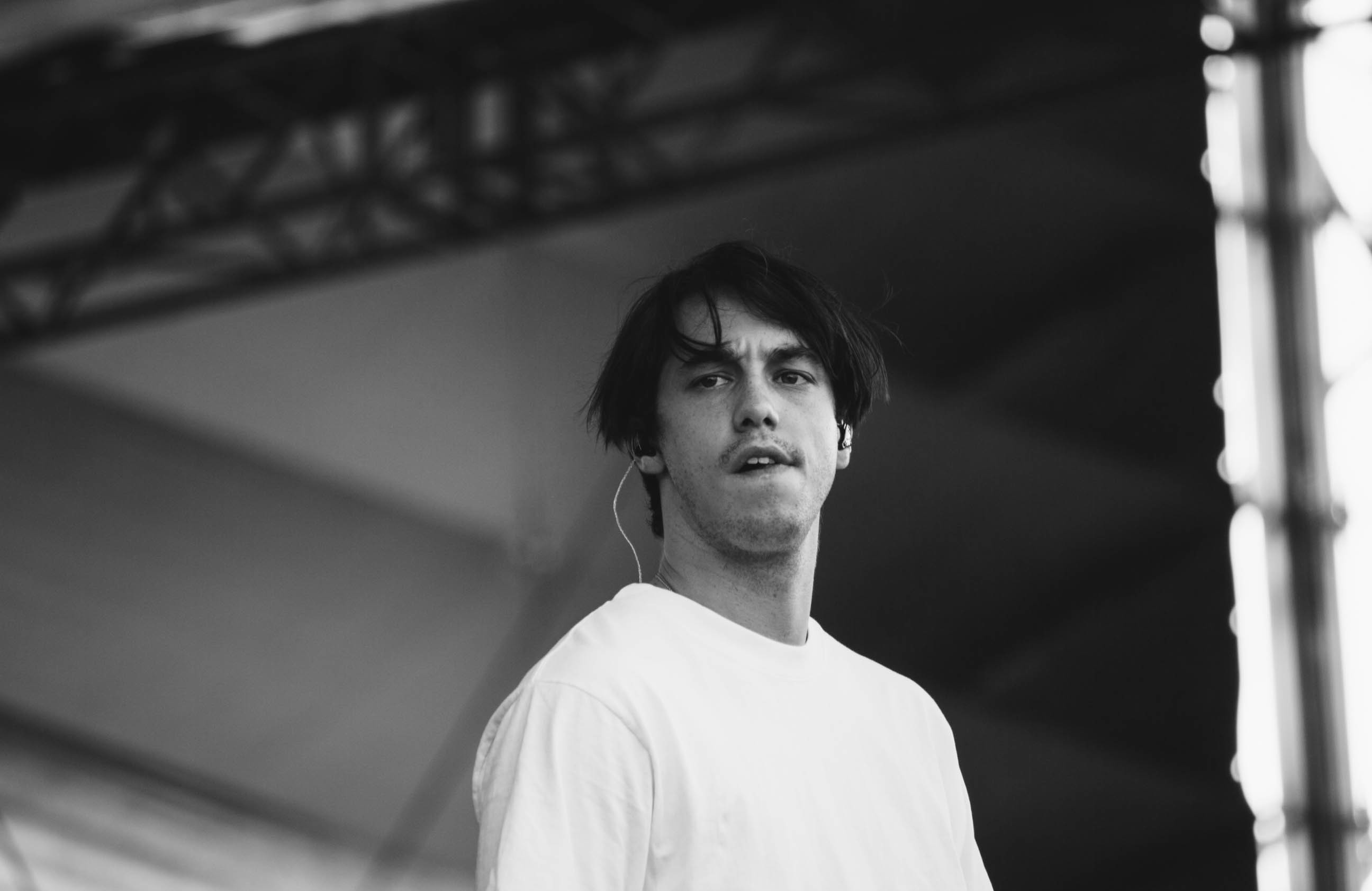
Vocalists Kevin Abstract (top) and Matt Champion (bottom) performing at Quebec City Summer Festival in 2018.

This is a chronological list of Brockhampton's known live performances.

== 2017 shows ==
Date	City	Country	Venue
"Jennifer's Tour" North American dates
September 3, 2017	Denver	United States	Globe Hall
September 5, 2017	Minneapolis	United States	7th Street Entry
September 6, 2017	Chicago	United States	Bottom Lounge
September 7, 2017	Detroit	United States	El Club
September 8, 2017	Grand Rapids	United States	The Stache
September 10, 2017	Toronto	Canada	Danforth Music Hall
September 11, 2017, two shows	New York	United States	Highline Ballroom
September 12, 2017	Cambridge	United States	Middle East
September 13, 2017	Philadelphia	United States	The Foundry
September 15, 2017, two shows	Washington	United States	Rock & Roll Hotel
September 18, 2017	Austin	United States	Come and Take It Live
September 19, 2017	Houston	United States	Warehouse Live
September 20, 2017	Dallas	United States	Trees
September 22, 2017	Phoenix	United States	Pub Rock
September 24, 2017	San Francisco	United States	Social Hall SF
September 25, 2017	Portland	United States	Peter's Room
September 27, 2017	Vancouver	Canada	Biltmore Cabaret
September 28, 2017	Seattle	United States	Chop Suey
September 29, 2017	Eugene	United States	Wow Hall
October 1, 2017	San Francisco	United States	Social Hall SF
October 2, 2017	San Diego	United States	The Observatory
Late 2017 California shows
October 28, 2017 (Note: The concert on October 28, 2017 at Exposition Park in Los Angeles was a part of Camp Flog Gnaw Carnival.)	Los Angeles	United States	Exposition Park
December 27, 2017	Los Angeles	United States	El Rey Theatre
December 28, 2017	Los Angeles	United States	El Rey Theatre
December 29, 2017 (Note: The concert on December 29, 2017 at the El Rey Theatre in Los Angeles was a part of the Brockhampton Prom.)	Los Angeles	United States	El Rey Theatre
December 30, 2017 (Note: The concert on December 30, 2017 at The Observatory in Santa Ana was as an opener for Tyler, The Creator.)	Santa Ana	United States	The Observatory

== 2018 shows ==
Date	City	Country	Venue
"Love Your Parents Tour" North American dates
January 16, 2018	Dallas	United States	House of Blues
January 17, 2018	Houston	United States	House of Blues
January 19, 2018	San Antonio	United States	Aztec Theatre
January 20, 2018	Austin	United States	Emo's
January 22, 2018	New Orleans	United States	House of Blues
January 23, 2018	Atlanta	United States	Buckhead Theatre
January 24, 2018	Atlanta	United States	Buckhead Theatre
January 25, 2018	Fort Lauderdale	United States	Revolution
January 26, 2018	Tampa	United States	The Ritz Ybor
January 28, 2018	Silver Spring	United States	The Fillmore
January 29, 2018	Raleigh	United States	The Ritz
January 30, 2018	Philadelphia	United States	Theatre of Living Arts
January 31, 2018	Philadelphia	United States	Theatre of Living Arts
February 2, 2018	New York	United States	Irving Plaza
February 3, 2018	New York	United States	Irving Plaza
February 4, 2018	New York	United States	Irving Plaza
February 5, 2018	Boston	United States	House of Blues
February 6, 2018	Montreal	Canada	Corona Theatre
February 8, 2018	Toronto	Canada	Rebel Theater
February 10, 2018	Indianapolis	United States	The Egyptian Room
February 11, 2018	Detroit	United States	Majestic Theater
February 12, 2018	Detroit	United States	Majestic Theater
February 13, 2018	Grand Rapids	United States	The Intersection
February 15, 2018	Minneapolis	United States	Music Hall
February 16, 2018	Milwaukee	United States	The Rave/Eagles Club
February 18, 2018	Chicago	United States	House of Blues
February 19, 2018	Chicago	United States	House of Blues
February 20, 2018	St. Louis	United States	The Pageant
February 21, 2018	Kansas City	United States	The Truman
February 22, 2018	Denver	United States	Ogden Theatre
February 24, 2018	Salt Lake City	United States	The Depot
February 26, 2018	Vancouver	Canada	Vogue Theatre
February 27, 2018	Seattle	United States	The Showbox
February 28, 2018	Seattle	United States	The Showbox
March 2, 2018	Portland	United States	Crystal Ballroom
March 3, 2018	San Francisco	United States	Warfield Theater
March 4, 2018	San Francisco	United States	Warfield Theater
March 5, 2018	Sacramento	United States	Ace of Spades
March 7, 2018	Phoenix	United States	The Van Buren
March 8, 2018	Phoenix	United States	The Van Buren
"Stereo Spirit Tour" North American dates.
April 14, 2018 (Note: The concerts on April 14 and 21, 2018 at Empire Polo Club in Indio was a part of the Coachella Valley Music & Arts Festival.)	Indio	United States	Empire Polo Club
April 17, 2018	Los Angeles	United States	The Novo
April 21, 2018	Indio	United States	Empire Polo Club
May 12, 2018 (Note: The concert on May 12, 2018 at Middle Harbor Shoreline Park in Oakland was a part of Blurry Vision.)	Oakland	United States	Middle Harbor Shoreline Park
May 25, 2018	Clifton Park	United States	Upstate Concert Hall
May 26, 2018 (Note: The concert on May 26, 2018 at Harvard Athletic Complex in Boston was a part of Boston Calling Music Festival.)	Boston	United States	Harvard Athletic Complex
Following the ejection of Ameer Vann from the group, Brockhampton cancelled the following US tour dates.
~~May 27, 2018 (Note: The concert on May 27, 2018 at Minnesota State Fairgrounds in Falcon Heights would have been a part of Soundset Music Festival.)~~	~~Falcon Heights~~	~~United States~~	~~Minnesota State Fairgrounds~~
~~May 29, 2018~~	~~Buffalo~~	~~United States~~	~~Town Ballroom~~
~~May 30, 2018~~	~~Pittsburgh~~	~~United States~~	~~Stage AE~~
~~May 31, 2018~~	~~Cleveland~~	~~United States~~	~~House of Blues~~
~~June 2, 2018 (Note: The concert on June 2, 2018 at Randalls Island in New York would have been a part of the Governors Ball Music Festival.)~~	~~New York~~	~~United States~~	~~Randalls Island~~
~~June 3, 2018~~	~~Baltimore~~	~~United States~~	~~Rams Head Live!~~
~~June 4, 2018~~	~~Richmond~~	~~United States~~	~~The National~~
~~June 5, 2018~~	~~Norfolk~~	~~United States~~	~~The NorVa~~
~~June 7, 2018~~	~~Charlotte~~	~~United States~~	~~The Fillmore~~
~~June 8, 2018~~	~~Birmingham~~	~~United States~~	~~Iron City Bham~~
~~June 9, 2018 (Note: The concert on June 9, 2018 at Great Stage Park in Manchester would have been a part of Bonnaroo Music Festival.)~~	~~Manchester~~	~~United States~~	~~Great Stage Park~~
~~June 11, 2018~~	~~Tulsa~~	~~United States~~	~~Cain's Ballroom~~
~~June 12, 2018~~	~~Oklahoma City~~	~~United States~~	~~Diamond Ballroom~~
~~June 14, 2018~~	~~Albuquerque~~	~~United States~~	~~Sunshine Theater~~
~~June 15, 2018~~	~~Tucson~~	~~United States~~	~~Rialto Theatre~~
~~June 16, 2018~~	~~Ventura~~	~~United States~~	~~Ventura Theater~~
Continued "Stereo Spirit" North American dates
June 30, 2018 (Note: The concert on June 30, 2018 at Long Beach Convention and Entertainment Center in Long Beach was a part of Agenda Festival.)	Long Beach	United States	Long Beach Convention and Entertainment Center
July 5, 2018 (Note: The concert on July 5, 2018 at Plains of Abraham in Quebec City was a part of Quebec City Summer Festival.)	Quebec City	Canada	Plains of Abraham
July 6, 2018 (Note: The concert on July 6, 2018 at LeBreton Flats Park in Ottawa was a part of Ottawa Bluesfest.)	Ottawa	Canada	LeBreton Flats Park
July 7, 2018 (Note: The concert on July 7, 2018 at Holland Park in Surrey was a part of FVDED In The Park.)	Surrey	Canada	Holland Park
July 21, 2018 (Note: The concert on July 21, 2018 at Capitol Hill in Seattle was a part of Capitol Hill Block Party.)	Seattle	United States	Capitol Hill
July 29, 2018 (Note: The concert on July 21, 2018 at West Riverfront Park in Detroit was a part of Mo Pop Festival.)	Detroit	United States	West Riverfront Park
July 31, 2018	Cincinnati	United States	Bogarts
August 1, 2018	Louisville	United States	Mercury Ballroom
August 3, 2018 (Note: The concert on August 3, 2018 at Grant Park in Chicago was a part of Lollapalooza.)	Chicago	United States	Grant Park
August 3, 2018	Chicago	United States	Concord Music Hall
August 5, 2018 (Note: The concert on August 5, 2018 at Parc Jean-Drapeau in Montreal was a part of Osheaga Festival.)	Montreal	Canada	Parc Jean-Drapeau
"Stereo Spirit" European dates
August 8, 2018 (Note: The concert on August 8, 2018 at Tøyen Park in Oslo was a part of Oya Festival.)	Oslo	Norway	Tøyen Park
August 9, 2018 (Note: The concert on August 9, 2018 at Slottsskogen in Gothenburg was a part of Way Out West.)	Gothenburg	Sweden	Slottsskogen
August 10, 2018 (Note: The concert on August 10, 2018 at Refshaleøen in Copenhagen was a part of Haven Festival.)	Copenhagen	Denmark	Refshaleøen
August 12, 2018 (Note: The concert on August 12, 2018 at Suvilahti in Helsinki was a part of Flow Festival.)	Helsinki	Finland	Suvilahti
August 14, 2018	Berlin	Germany	Festsaal Kreuzberg
August 16, 2018 (Note: The concert on August 16, 2018 at Kiewit in Hasselt was a part of Pukkelpop.)	Hasselt	Belgium	Kiewit
August 17, 2018 (Note: The concert on August 17, 2018 at Suvilahti in Biddinghuizen was a part of Lowlands Festival.)	Biddinghuizen	Netherlands	Spijk en Bremerberg
August 18, 2018	Amsterdam	Netherlands	Melkweg
August 20, 2018	London	England	KOKO
August 21, 2018	London	England	KOKO
August 22, 2018	Dublin	Ireland	Helix
August 24, 2018 (Note: The concert on August 24, 2018 at U Arena in Paris was a part of Summer Jam.)	Paris	France	U Arena
August 25, 2018 (Note: The concerts on August 25, 2018 at Little John's Farm in Reading was a part of Reading Festival.)	Reading	England	Little John's Farm
August 26, 2018 (Note: The concert on August 26, 2018 at Bramham Park in Leeds was a part of Leeds Festival.)	Leeds	England	Bramham Park
"Brockhampton: Live in Australia / New Zealand" dates
September 21, 2018	Auckland	New Zealand	Logan Campbell Centre
September 22, 2018 (Note: The concerts on September 22, 23, 29 and 30, 2018 in Australia were a part of Listen Out.)	Melbourne	Australia	Catani Gardens
September 23, 2018	Perth	Australia	HBF Stadium
September 25, 2018	Melbourne	Australia	Forum Theatre
September 26, 2018	Sydney	Australia	Enmore Theatre
September 29, 2018	Sydney	Australia	Centennial Parklands
September 30, 2018	Brisbane	Australia	Victoria Park
"I'll Be There Tour" North American dates
October 3, 2018	Tempe	United States	Marquee Theatre
October 5, 2018 (Note: The concerts on October 5 and 12, 2018 at Zilker Park in Austin were a part of Austin City Limits Music Festival.)	Austin	United States	Zilker Park
October 6, 2018	Austin	United States	Stubb's Waller Creek Amphitheatre
October 7, 2018	Houston	United States	Revention Music Center
October 9, 2018	Kansas City	United States	Arvest Bank Theatre
October 10, 2018	Dallas	United States	South Side Ballroom
October 12, 2018	Austin	United States	Zilker Park
October 13, 2018	New Orleans	United States	Orpheum Theater
October 14, 2018	Atlanta	United States	Coca-Cola Roxy
October 16, 2018	Washington D. C.	United States	The Anthem
October 17, 2018	Philadelphia	United States	The Fillmore
October 18, 2018	Philadelphia	United States	The Fillmore
October 20, 2018	Boston	United States	Agganis Arena
October 21, 2018	New York	United States	Terminal 5
October 22, 2018	New York	United States	Terminal 5
October 24, 2018	New York	United States	Terminal 5
October 26, 2018	Detroit	United States	Masonic Temple
October 28, 2018	Chicago	United States	Aragon Ballroom
October 30, 2018	Minneapolis	United States	The Armory
November 1, 2018	Denver	United States	Fillmore Auditorium
November 3, 2018	Seattle	United States	WaMu Theater
November 5, 2018	Vancouver	Canada	PNE Forum
November 7, 2018	Boise	United States	Revolution Concert House
November 8, 2018	San Francisco	United States	Bill Graham Civic Auditorium
November 11, 2018 (Note: The concert on November 11, 2018 at Dodger Stadium in Los Angeles was a part of the Camp Flog Gnaw Carnival.)	Los Angeles	United States	Dodger Stadium
November 28, 2018	Los Angeles	United States	Shrine Exposition Hall
November 29, 2018	Los Angeles	United States	Shrine Exposition Hall
December 1, 2018	San Diego	United States	Valley View Casino Center
December 3, 2018	Santa Ana	United States	The Observatory
December 6, 2018	Las Vegas	United States	The Chelsea at The Cosmopolitan

== 2019 shows ==
Date	City	Country	Venue	Opening acts
Early 2019 US festival dates
May 31, 2019 (Note: The concert on May 31, 2019 at Randalls Island in New York was a part of Governors Ball Music Festival.)	New York	United States	Randall's Island	—N/a
June 14, 2019 (Note: The concert on June 14, 2019 at Great Stage Park in Manchester was a part of Bonnaroo Music Festival.)	Manchester	United States	Great Stage Park	—N/a
June 22, 2019 (Note: The concert on June 22, 2019 at The Woodlands of Dover International Speedway in Dover was a part of Firefly Music Festival.)	Dover	United States	The Woodlands of Dover International Speedway	—N/a
2019 European festival dates
June 27, 2019 (Note: The concert on June 27, 2019 at Festivalpark in Werchter was a part of Rock Werchter.)	Werchter	Belgium	Festivalpark	—N/a
June 28, 2019 (Note: The concert on June 28, 2019 at Gärdet in Stockholm was a part of Lollapalooza Stockholm.)	Stockholm	Sweden	Gärdet	—N/a
June 29, 2019 (Note: The concert on June 29, 2019 at St. Gallen in St. Gallen was a part of Open Air St. Gallen.)	St. Gallen	Switzerland	St. Gallen	—N/a
July 2, 2019 (Note: The concert on July 2, 2019 at Kadettangen in Sandvika was a part of Kadetten Festival.)	Sandvika	Norway	Kadettangen	—N/a
July 4, 2019 (Note: The concert on July 4, 2019 at Roskilde in Roskilde was a part of Roskilde Festival.)	Roskilde	Denmark	Roskilde Festival	—N/a
July 5, 2019 (Note: The concert on July 5, 2019 at Ruissalo in Turku was a part of Ruisrock Festival.)	Turku	Finland	Ruissalo	—N/a
July 6, 2019 (Note: The concert on July 6, 2019 at Ericeira Camping in Ericeira was a part of Sumol Summer Fest.)	Ericeira	Portugal	Ericeira Camping	—N/a
July 7, 2019 (Note: The concert on July 7, 2019 at Marlay Park in Dublin was a part of Longitude Festival.)	Dublin	Ireland	Marlay Park	—N/a
July 11, 2019 (Note: The concert on July 11, 2019 at Ferropolis in Gräfenhainichen was a part of Splash! Festival.)	Gräfenhainichen	Germany	Ferropolis	—N/a
July 12, 2019 (Note: The concert on July 12, 2019 at Mount Cobetas in Bilbao was a part of Bilbao BBK Live.)	Bilbao	Spain	Mount Cobetas	—N/a
July 13, 2019 (Note: The concert on July 13, 2019 at Gunnersbury Park in London was a part of Lovebox Festival.)	London	England	Gunnersbury Park	—N/a
July 14, 2019 (Note: The concert on July 14, 2019 at Safaripark Beekse Bergen in Hilvarenbeek was a part of Woo Hah! Festival.)	Hilvarenbeek	Netherlands	Safaripark Beekse Bergen	—N/a
2019 Japanese festival dates
August 15, 2019	Tokyo	Japan	Studio Coast	—N/a
August 17, 2019 (Note: The concerts on August 17 and 18, 2019 in Japan were a part of Summer Sonic Festival.)	Osaka	Japan	Maishima Sonic Park	—N/a
August 18, 2019	Tokyo	Japan	Zozo Marine Stadium & Makuhari Messe	—N/a
"Friday Therapy" Los Angeles show
August 23, 2019 (Note: The concert on August 23, 2019 at the Fonda Theatre in Los Angeles was a part of Friday Therapy.)	Los Angeles	United States	Fonda Theatre	Dominic Fike; JPEGMAFIA; Deb Never; 100 gecs
Heaven Belongs to You Tour, North American dates
October 26, 2019	Vancouver	Canada	PNE Forum	100 gecs
October 27, 2019	Seattle	United States	WaMu Theater	100 gecs
October 30, 2019	Salt Lake City	United States	The Union Event Center	100 gecs
November 1, 2019	Phoenix	United States	The Van Buren	slowthai 100 gecs
November 2, 2019	Phoenix	United States	The Van Buren	slowthai 100 gecs
November 3, 2019 (Note: The concert on November 3, 2019 at Las Vegas Festival Grounds in Las Vegas was a part of Day N Night.)	Las Vegas	United States	Las Vegas Festival Grounds	—N/a
November 5, 2019	Fresno	United States	Rainbow Ballroom	slowthai 100 gecs
November 8, 2019	Stanford	United States	Frost Amphitheater	slowthai 100 gecs
November 9, 2019 (Note: The concert on November 9, 2019 at Dodger Stadium in Los Angeles was a part of the Camp Flog Gnaw Carnival.)	Los Angeles	United States	Dodger Stadium	—N/a
November 13, 2019	San Antonio	United States	The Aztec Theater	slowthai 100 gecs
November 14, 2019	Dallas	United States	The Bomb Factory	slowthai 100 gecs
November 15, 2019	Austin	United States	ACL Live at the Moody Theater	slowthai 100 gecs
November 17, 2019	New Orleans	United States	The Fillmore New Orleans	slowthai 100 gecs
November 19, 2019	Miami Beach	United States	The Jackie Gleason Theater	slowthai 100 gecs
November 20, 2019	Atlanta	United States	Coca-Cola Roxy	slowthai 100 gecs
November 22, 2019	New York	United States	Hulu Theater at Madison Square Garden	slowthai 100 gecs
November 23, 2019	New York	United States	Hulu Theater at Madison Square Garden	slowthai 100 gecs
November 24, 2019	Boston	United States	Agganis Arena	slowthai 100 gecs
November 25, 2019	Washington D. C.	United States	The Anthem	slowthai 100 gecs
November 27, 2019	Philadelphia	United States	The Fillmore	slowthai 100 gecs
November 29, 2019	Toronto	Canada	Coca-Cola Coliseum	slowthai 100 gecs
November 30, 2019	Detroit	United States	Masonic Temple	slowthai 100 gecs
December 1, 2019	Cleveland	United States	The Agora	slowthai 100 gecs
December 3, 2019	Minneapolis	United States	The Armory	slowthai 100 gecs
December 4, 2019	Milwaukee	United States	The Eagles Ballroom	slowthai 100 gecs
December 6, 2019	Chicago	United States	Aragon Ballroom	slowthai 100 gecs
December 9, 2019	Denver	United States	Mission Ballroom	slowthai 100 gecs
December 13, 2019; two shows	Los Angeles	United States	Hollywood Palladium	slowthai 100 gecs
December 17, 2019	Seattle	United States	Neumos	N/A

== 2020 shows ==
Date	City	Country	Venue
Australian & New Zealand 2020 festival dates
January 4, 2020 (Note: The concerts on January 4, 5, 11, 12 & 15, 2020 in Australia and New Zealand were a part of FOMO Festival.)	Brisbane	Australia	Brisbane Showgrounds
January 5, 2020	Adelaide	Australia	Elder Park
January 10, 2020	Perth	Australia	Belvoir Amphitheatre
January 11, 2020	Sydney	Australia	Parramatta Park
January 12, 2020	Melbourne	Australia	Melbourne Showgrounds
January 15, 2020	Auckland	New Zealand	Trusts Arena Outdoors

== 2022 shows ==
Date	City	Country	Venue
February 7, 2022	London	United Kingdom	Brixton Academy
February 8, 2022	London	United Kingdom	Brixton Academy
April 16, 2022	Indio	United States	Coachella Valley Music and Arts Festival
April 23, 2022	Indio	United States	Coachella Valley Music and Arts Festival
November 19, 2022	Los Angeles	United States	Fonda Theatre
