= Coronet Theatre =

Coronet Theatre, or Coronet Theater may refer to:

- Coronet Theatre (Los Angeles), former theatre which closed in 2008
- Coronet Theatre (San Francisco), former theatre which closed in 2005
- Coronet Theatre (Broadway), New York City, New York, now called the Eugene O'Neill Theatre
- The Coronet, Elephant and Castle, London, also called the Coronet Theatre
- Coronet Theatre, Notting Hill, a theatre in Notting Hill, London
