= Great Star Theater =

San Francisco Chinese opera house

- 大明星戲院
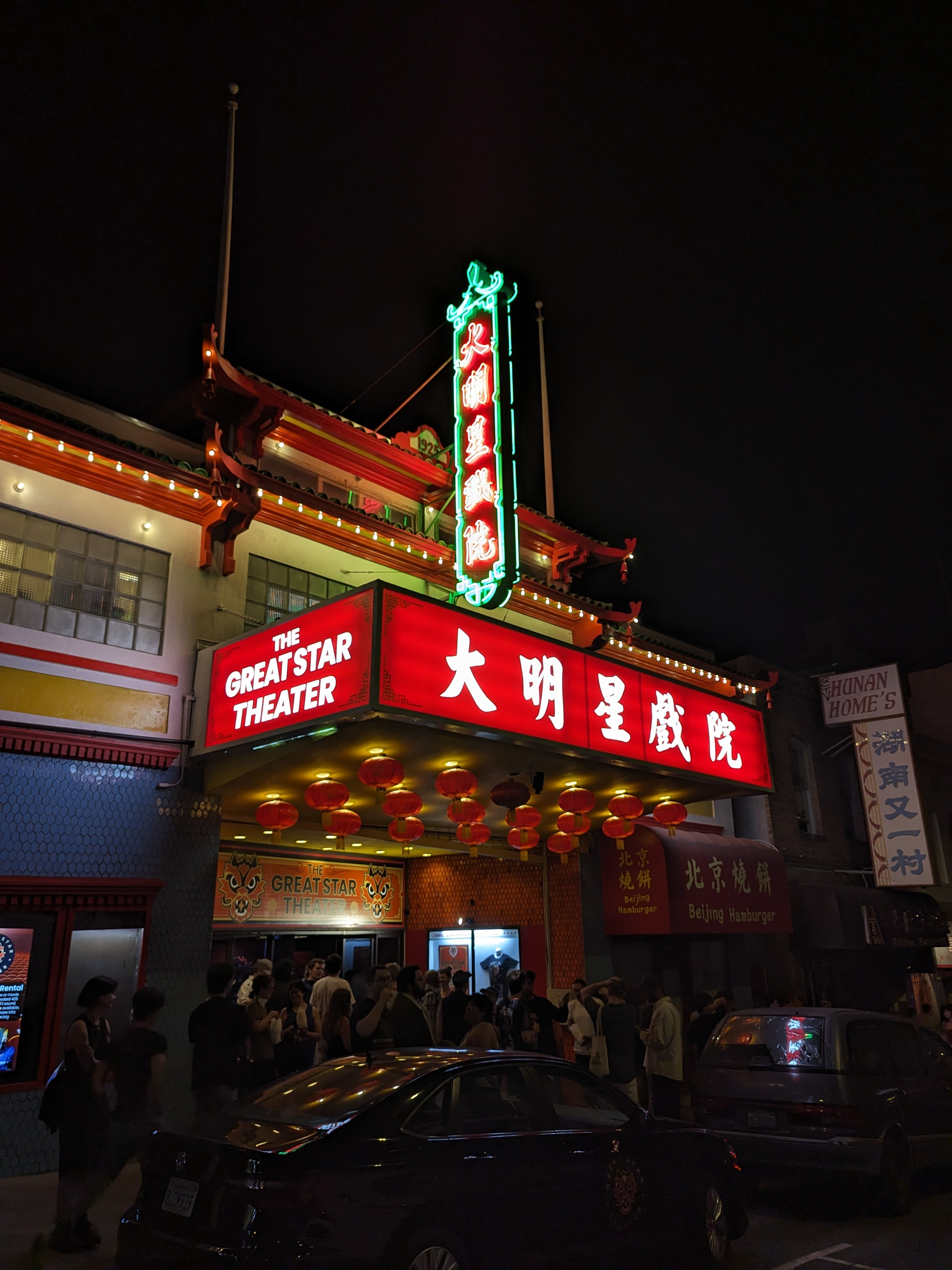
- Interactive map of Great Star Theater
- Former names: Great China Theater
- Location: 636 Jackson Street; San Francisco, California; United States
- Coordinates: 37°47′47″N 122°24′21″W
- Capacity: 410, formerly 500+
- Type: Theater

Construction
- Opened: 1925

Website
- www.greatstartheater.org

The Great Star Theater, formerly known as Great China Theater, is a 410-seat theater located at 636 Jackson Street in San Francisco's Chinatown. It was built in 1925 for the Chinese opera and is the last Chinese theater in any Chinatown in the United States.

== History ==
=== Origin and Chinese opera ===
The Great China Theater, later named the Great Star, was built in 1925 as a rival of the nearby Mandarin Theater (renamed Sun Sing in 1949), which was built in 1924. The theaters, which were one block apart from each other, featured Chinese opera, often with top stage talent from China. The theaters were cultural centers for Chinese-Americans in Chinatown, and hosted protest and political events for both American causes and Chinese, such as honoring the Chinese leader Sun Yat-sen The Pacific Chinese Dramatic Club opened offices in the theater in 1930. Toy Kaye Lowe, president of the Chinese Improvement Association, was a director of the theater in 1930. Though the Chinese operas were as long as five hours, many patrons chatted, ate snacks, and read the newspaper during the performances.

=== Opera and movies ===
Due to World War II, many Chinese opera troupes disbanded or stopped touring, so the Great China Theater showed Chinese-language movies, which were made in China and shipped to San Francisco and then New York. A San Francisco-based company called Grand View Film filmed Chinese-language movies in both China and the United States. In addition, American short films were shown at the Great China Theater.

In 1959, the San Francisco Examiner wrote that the Great China Theater was the last active Chinese opera house in the United States. Due to the decline in Chinese opera, the theater stayed afloat by showing movies, relegating operas to special occasions like the Dragon Boat Festival and Mid-Autumn Festival. 1963, during the Foo Hsing Troup’s run at the theater, the San Francisco Examiner wrote that the venue was “the best Chinese theater we have seen in just about 30 years, since Mei Lan Fang was here.”

In 1969, Theater operator Allen Wu reported that locals had vandalized the sign, forced themselves into movies, and damaged the marquee with slingshots. Crime from youth gangs continued to be a problem through the early 1970s. In 1974, the San Francisco Examiner wrote that the theater filled up for its showings of Kung Fu movies. Films were shown sporadically throughout the 1990s.

=== Bruce Lee ===
Bruce Lee used to attend the theater and sleep in the nearby alley as a child. Bruce Lee's father, a Chinese immigrant, performed on the stage. Great Star was where Lee technically launched his movie career in 1941, when he was just an infant. He played a newborn girl in the Cantonese-language film "Golden Gate Girl," directed by his family friend Esther Eng. In the late 1960s, as Bruce Lee gained fame in Hong Kong, the Great Star Theater played new Hong Kong films the same week they were released.

=== 2010 refurbishing ===
In 2010, business partners George Kaskanlian Jr. and Kenny Montero, both real estate developers, took on a 10-year lease and refurbished the aging theater. When they arrived, the theater was run down. "It was dark and moldy... the fabric on the walls was stained and ripped up. The seats were filthy. The bathrooms looked like a scene from a horror movie. The projection room was filled with cobwebs and dust," Kaskanlian told the SF Gate.

In May 2015, a 31-year-old woman was found dead inside the theater next to Harris Rosenbloom, a promoter for the theater who was leasing the building. He said that he fell asleep in the theater and discovered the woman's body upon waking up. He called 911 at 11:55am. Rosenbloom was initially investigated for murder, but due to a lack of evidence, he was not charged. Rosenbloom had worked in San Francisco arts for decades, and starting in 1996, he maintained a magazine called SF Source with information about local events, which was compared to Pariscope. In 2014, an entertainment permit he requested was denied due to zoning restrictions.

=== 2021 re-opening ===
On June 18, 2021, Alice Chu and Roger Pincombe re-opened the venue with a 10-year lease. The married couple, who had their first date at the theater in 2017, work as software engineers for Salesforce. In 2021, they created a nonprofit called Great Star Theater and spent $150,000 on restorations. Pincombe reported that the theater had been "more or less disused the past few decades."

== Operations ==
As of 2015, Great Star Theater is owned by Julie Lee, a community organizer who faced federal and state charges in 2008 for illegal activity surrounding an election campaign. It is operated by Paul Nathan, a professional musician.

The theater hosts films and alternative events, such as a Star Wars strip show. It is a stop on ghost tours of San Francisco and was explored in the TV docuseries The Haunted Bay for its supposed haunted bathroom. It was featured the documentary "A Moment in Time," about Chinese movies in San Francisco directed by Ruby Yang and Lambert Yam.

== See also ==
- List of theatres in San Francisco
