= Lamplighters Music Theatre =

Lamplighters Music Theatre is a semi-professional musical theatre company based in San Francisco, California. Founded in 1952 by Orva Hoskinson and Ann Pool MacNab, the Lamplighters specialize in light opera, particularly the works of Gilbert and Sullivan, as well as such works as The Merry Widow, Die Fledermaus, Of Thee I Sing, My Fair Lady, Candide, and A Little Night Music.

== History ==
Lamplighters' first production was a revival of Patience by Gilbert and Sullivan in March and April 1958. The Mercury News praised the casting in the troupe's 2011 version of The Yeoman of the Guard. Later in 2011, it put on a production of H.M.S. Pinafore and produced the same opera with a new cast in 2019. In 2013, the troupe staged Iolanthe and later that year The Sorcerer.

In 2014, it performed a new translation of Die Fledermaus at the Bankhead Theater in Livermore. Also in 2014, they put on Candide. as well as in 2015. In 2016, the troupe's revised version of The Mikado was well-received by critics, who judged that the retelling of the tale in Milan instead of Japan removed elements that have made the original controversial in recent years. The production was named The New Mikado – Una Commedia Musicale.

A "sampler" show of elements of multiple comic operas by Gilbert and Sullivan was presented in early 2017, receiving a mixed review by The Mercury News, which praised the performance but called the adaptation, created by the director, overlong at three hours. In 2017, their touring performance of The Yeomen of the Guard was given a positive reception by The Mercury News. Co-founder Orva Hoskinson died in 2017, after serving in the troupe for years as a director and performer; the same year, the troupe announced Dennis Lickteig as artistic director. Gilbert and Sullivan's The Gondoliers was put on in 2018. In 2019, the Lamplighters produced a spoof: Trial by Jury Duty, paired with Thespis. Later the same year, Nicolas Aliaga Garcia directed The Pirates of Penzance.

Amid financial difficulties, the company cancelled its early 2026 production of Patience.

== Production style and venues ==
The company's season usually comprises four productions: a fully staged production in January/February; a staged concert in the spring; a fully staged production in July/August; and a full-length original musical comedy, presented as a champagne gala fundraiser and silent auction, in November. The company also creates educational programs for schools.

The Lamplighters performed at Harding Theater from 1961 to 1968 and then at the University of San Francisco's until 1995. Since then, it has performed at San Francisco's Novellus Theater at Yerba Buena Center for the Arts, Lesher Center for the Arts in Walnut Creek and several other Bay Area theaters.

== Critical reception ==
The Mercury News said that "Lamplighters Music Theatre knows the works of W. S. Gilbert and Arthur Sullivan backwards, forwards, upside down and inside out." Since its founding, it has "been chiefly devoted to the works of Gilbert and Sullivan," and has also produced musicals, for example A Little Night Music by Stephen Sondheim in early 2019.

The San Francisco Chronicle review called the company's 2010 production of Gilbert and Sullivan's Patience, "a splendid and loving production", commenting that the performance "used the company's long experience of the Savoy operettas to fine effect. At their best, the Lamplighters' productions take an approach to this material that is mindful of tradition without ever seeming musty or warmed over." Talkin' Broadway called the company's Princess Ida "a gorgeous production. ... The singing of the principals is superior. ... The chorus work as usual is superb, and the full orchestra is brilliant. The sets and costumes are breathtaking".
