= Balboa Theater (San Francisco) =

Movie theater in San Francisco, California, US

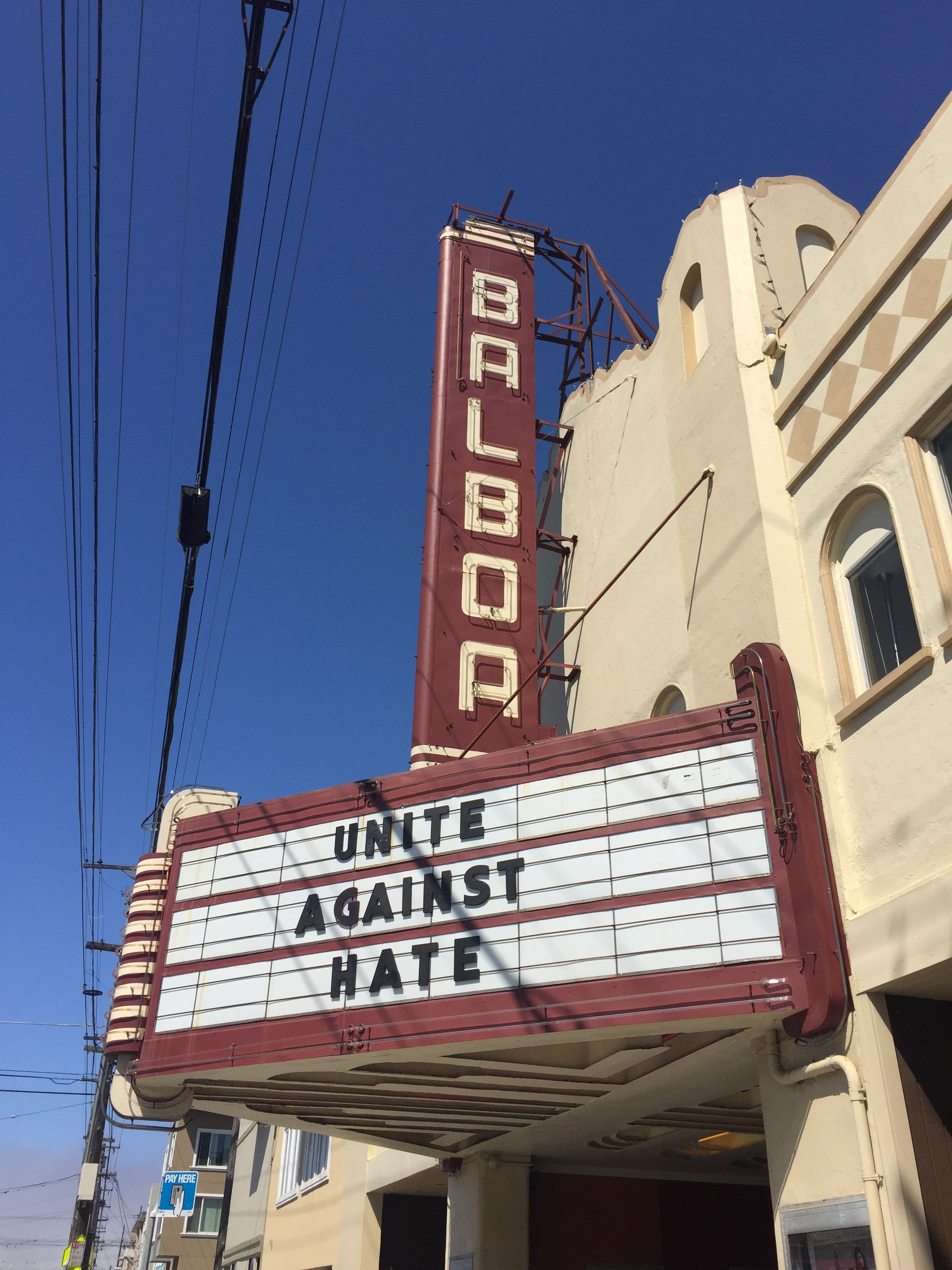
- Interactive map of Balboa Theater
- Former names: New Balboa Theatre, Balboa Theatre, The Balboa
- Address: 3630 Balboa Street, San Francisco, California, U.S.
- Coordinates: 37.776042°N 122.498063°W

Construction
- Opened: February 27, 1926
- Architect: Reid & Reid

Website
- www.balboamovies.com

The Balboa Theater is a historic two-screen movie theater in the Outer Richmond neighborhood of San Francisco, California, US. Since 2012, it is part of the CinemaSFBay chain. It was formerly known as the New Balboa Theatre and is also called The Balboa.

== History ==
The theater was founded by the Samuel H. Levin which also owned many neighborhood theaters in the city as part of his chain known as San Francisco Theatres Inc., which included the Alexandria, Coronet, Coliseum, and El Rey. It opened on February 27, 1926, as the New Balboa Theatre, with a 800 person seating capacity. It was named after Vasco Núñez de Balboa. The theatre was run by the Levin family until February 2001.

From 2001 until 2011, the Balboa Theater was owned and operated by Gary Meyer, a co-owner of the Landmark Theatres chain. Under Meyer's leadership, the theater offered lower priced tickets compared to the larger cinema chains, and had nicer food offerings.

The CinemaSF chain which is associated with the nonprofit San Francisco Neighborhood Theatre Foundation, owns the Balboa Theater since 2012, as well as Vogue Theater, and 4-Star Theater in San Francisco. During the COVID-19 pandemic, it was one of the local theaters that suffered a financial loss.
