= Harding Theater =

Coordinates: 37.77551°N 122.43767°W

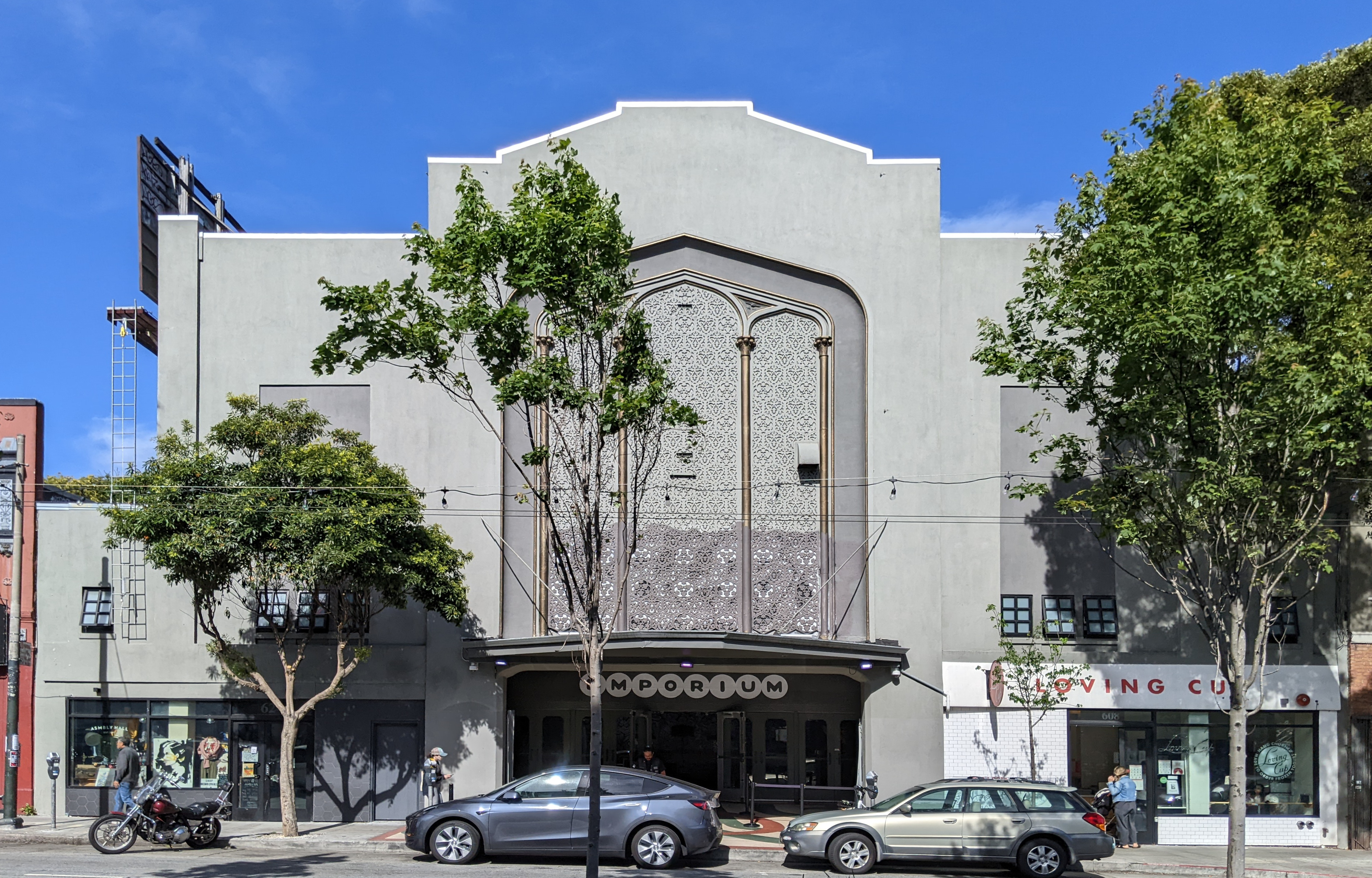
- The building in 2022
- Interactive map of the Harding Theater area

General information
- Type: Theater
- Architectural style: Gothic, Moorish
- Location: San Francisco, California, United States
- Completed: 1926

Design and construction
- Architect: Reid Brothers
- Main contractor: Samuel H. Levin

The Harding Theater is a historic movie theater located at 616 Divisadero Street in San Francisco, California, completed in 1926, and closed c. 2004. In 2017, the Emporium Arcade Bar opened in the space.

== History ==
The Harding Theater was built in 1926 by local theater owner Samuel H. Levin who hired Reid Brothers architects. The theater opened April 8, 1926 with Colleen Moore starring in the first movie version of the hit musical Irene.

As with other facilities built by the Reid Brothers, it has a capacity of between 800 and 1200 people. The Harding was used as a movie theater from 1926 to 1970. The theatrical group Lamplighters Music Theatre performed at the facility from 1961 to 1968, The Grateful Dead played the theater on 6 and 7 November 1971 (with their first performance of "Hideaway" on the 7th).

From the mid-1970s to 2004, the theater was used as a church. In 2004 (approximate date), the building was purchased by developers for US$1.6 million.

== Renovation ==
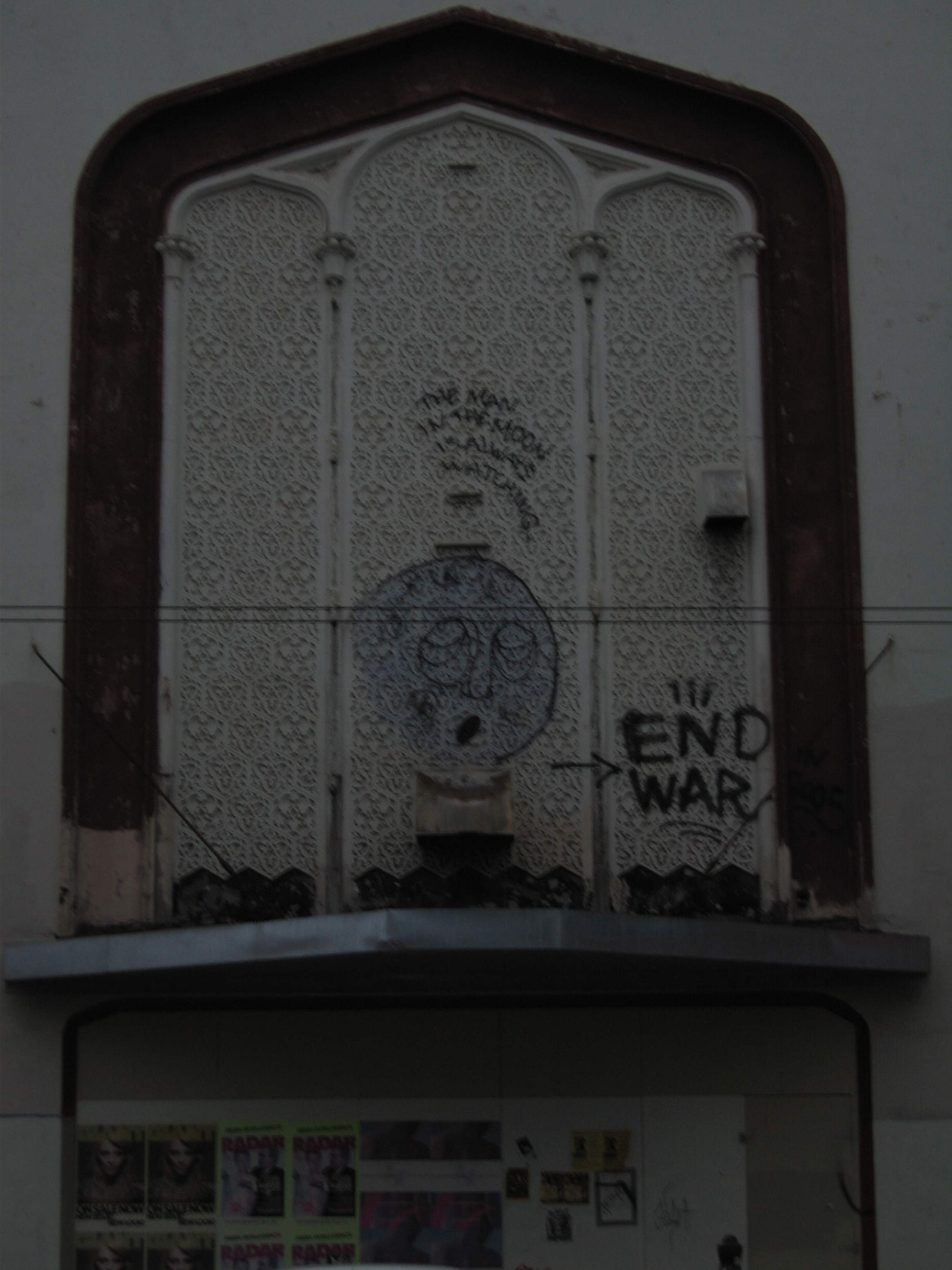
Boarded-up facade of Harding Theater in 2005

The owner/developer had a "compromise" plan—to remove the back fly system (see also batten) - so that a separate independent structure containing eight units of housing condominia could be constructed while preserving the existing proscenium arch, maintaining the existing auditorium and lobby and their extant detailing. Consideration for the removal and reconstruction of the raked theater floor and seating to allow for a new parking level below, addition of windows, and the upgrade of restrooms to conform with modern building codes were also reviewed in depth to conform with the Secretary of the Interior's "Standards for the Rehabilitation of Historic Structures".

Historic preservation activists believed this plan was threatening the historical integrity of the building and limited its future uses. An appeal was filed against the San Francisco Planning Department's "Negative Declaration" to the Environmental Impact Report under the California Environmental Quality Act (CEQA). In 2005, a similar challenge was successfully made against the negative declaration to the developer's original plan to demolish the entire theater to build more condominiums. That appeal was heard by the San Francisco Board of Supervisors in April 2005.

The Planning Department's Mitigated Negative Declaration was appealed by Friends of 1800 and was heard on September 25, 2008. The Planning Department rescinded that Preliminary Negative Declaration and prepared a new one, which has also been appealed by the Friends of 1800.

The request for an EIR was heard on November 13, 2008, by the San Francisco Planning Commission. The Planning Commission unanimously approved the request of the Friends of 1800 for an EIR, so an EIR was required for the project. A feasible plan to pay for and preserve the entire theater was not put forward by the activists. The developer then put up the building up for sale. Later in 2008, a local theater preservation nonprofit was investigating ways to preserve the theater (which at this point had remained closed for several years) and turn it into "a showplace for indie movies, movie festivals and live performances."

In November 2010, laser cats were painted on the theater's boarded up entrance.

In 2015, after the theater had remained empty for a decade, a conditional-use permit hearing was held to convert the main space into an arcade bar, the fourth in the franchise from Chicago-based Emporium Arcade Bar. The venue, which features 50 vintage arcade games, a full bar, and live music, opened in December, 2017. The tenants removed dilapidated aspects, such as seating, while renovating more historic items.
