= Richmond District, San Francisco =

Richmond District Park-Presidio District (1917–2009)
- Neighborhood
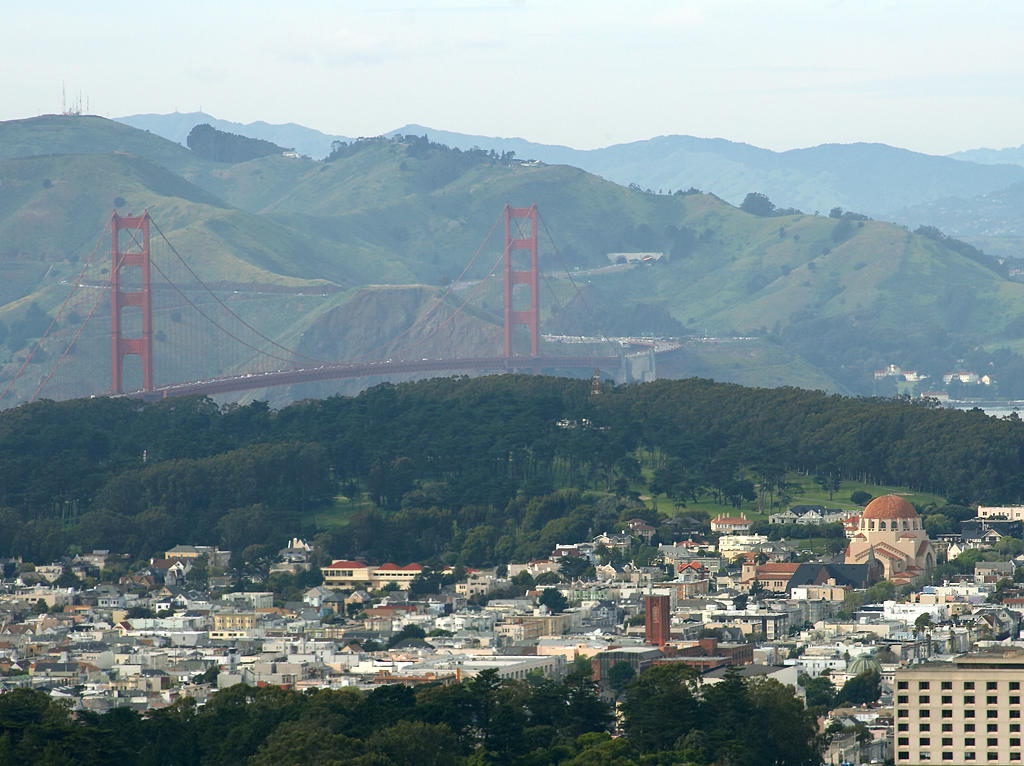
- San Francisco's Richmond District in foreground, with Golden Gate Bridge, Marin Headlands, and the Presidio in background
- Nicknames: The Richmond, The Avenues
- Location within San Francisco
- Coordinates: 37.7782°N 122.4846°W
- Country: United States
- State: California
- City and county: San Francisco
- Named for: Richmond, Victoria, Australia

Government
  - Supervisor: Connie Chan
  - Assemblymember: Catherine Stefani (D)
  - State Senator: Scott Wiener (D)
  - U. S. Repr.: Nancy Pelosi (D)

Area
  - Total: 2.705 sq mi (7.01 km^{2})
  - Land: 2.705 sq mi (7.01 km^{2})

Population
  - Total: 59,297
  - Density: 21,920/sq mi (8,460/km^{2})
- Time zone: UTC−8 (Pacific)
  - Summer (DST): UTC−7 (PDT)
- ZIP codes: 94118, 94121
- Area codes: 415/628

The Richmond District is a neighborhood in the northwest corner of San Francisco, on the West Side of the city. Developed initially in the late 19th century, the district is bordered by Golden Gate Park on the south, the Pacific Ocean to the west, and Lincoln Park, Mountain Lake Park and the Presidio of San Francisco to the north, bisected by the Presidio Greenbelt.

== Name ==
The neighborhood was given its name by Australian immigrant and art dealer George Turner Marsh, one of the neighborhood's earliest residents, who called his home "the Richmond House" after Richmond, a suburb of Melbourne, Australia. In 1917, the district was legally named "Park-Presidio District", chosen to avoid confusion between the district and the city of Richmond right across the bay. In spite of the official change, San Franciscans continued to use the old name.

The name Park-Presidio remained on the books until January 2009, when newly elected Supervisor Eric Mar introduced legislation that officially renamed the area north of Golden Gate Park and west of Arguello Boulevard the Richmond District.

== History ==
The Richmond District, originally an expanse of rolling sand dunes called Outside Lands, was developed initially in the late 19th century. Before this development, the Yelamu Tribe of the Ohlone Nation frequented the coastal sites of the current day district and had a village where the development would take place. In the later 18th century, they were not able to use this land anymore after Spanish explorers arrived and began setting up missions with the intent of converting and displacing the Ohlone people. Adolph Sutro was one of the first large-scale developers of the area. After purchasing the Cliff House in the early 1880s, he built the Sutro Baths on the western end, near Ocean Beach.

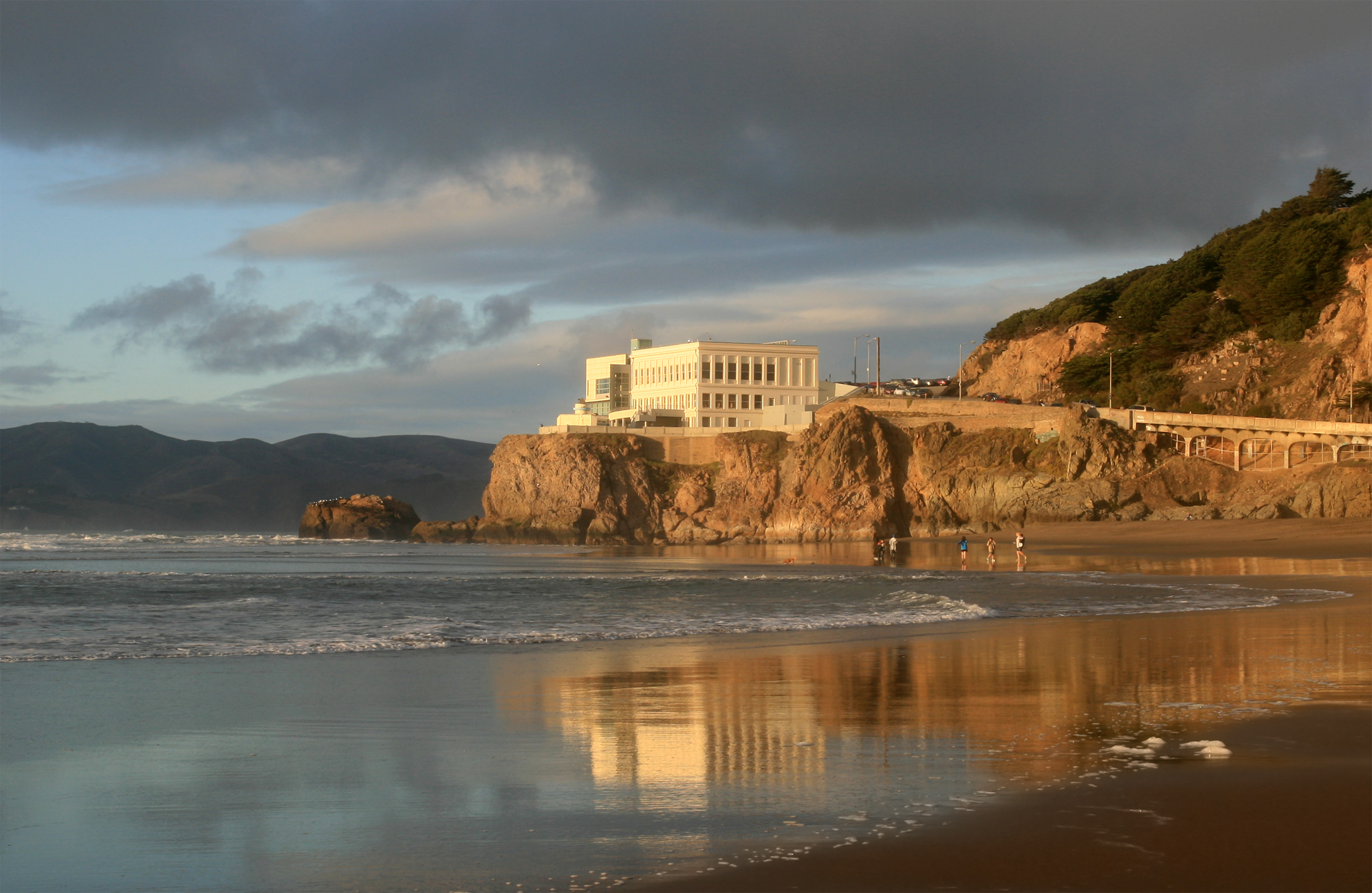
First built in 1858 and rebuilt in 1896, the Cliff House in the Outer Richmond went through several incarnations and is now a popular restaurant.

After the 1906 earthquake, development increased with the need to provide replacement housing. The last of the sand dunes and coastal scrub that once dominated the area were built over to create a streetcar suburb.

Playland (San Francisco) was an amusement park by the beach in the neighborhood. It began as a series of food stands in the 1880s, which expanded to include 10 attractions such as a carousel by 1921. The Big Dipper roller coaster came in 1923.

The Russian Revolution and subsequent civil war brought many Anti-Communist White Russian, Orthodox Russian refugees and immigrants into the neighborhood. Russian Orthodox Church Outside Russia briefly made its headquarters at Holy Virgin Cathedral on Geary Boulevard.

In the 1950s, and especially after the lifting of the Chinese Exclusion Act in 1965, Chinese immigrants began to replace the ethnic Jewish and Irish-Americans who had dominated the district before World War II. Chinese of birth or descent now make up nearly half of residents in the Richmond District.

== Location ==
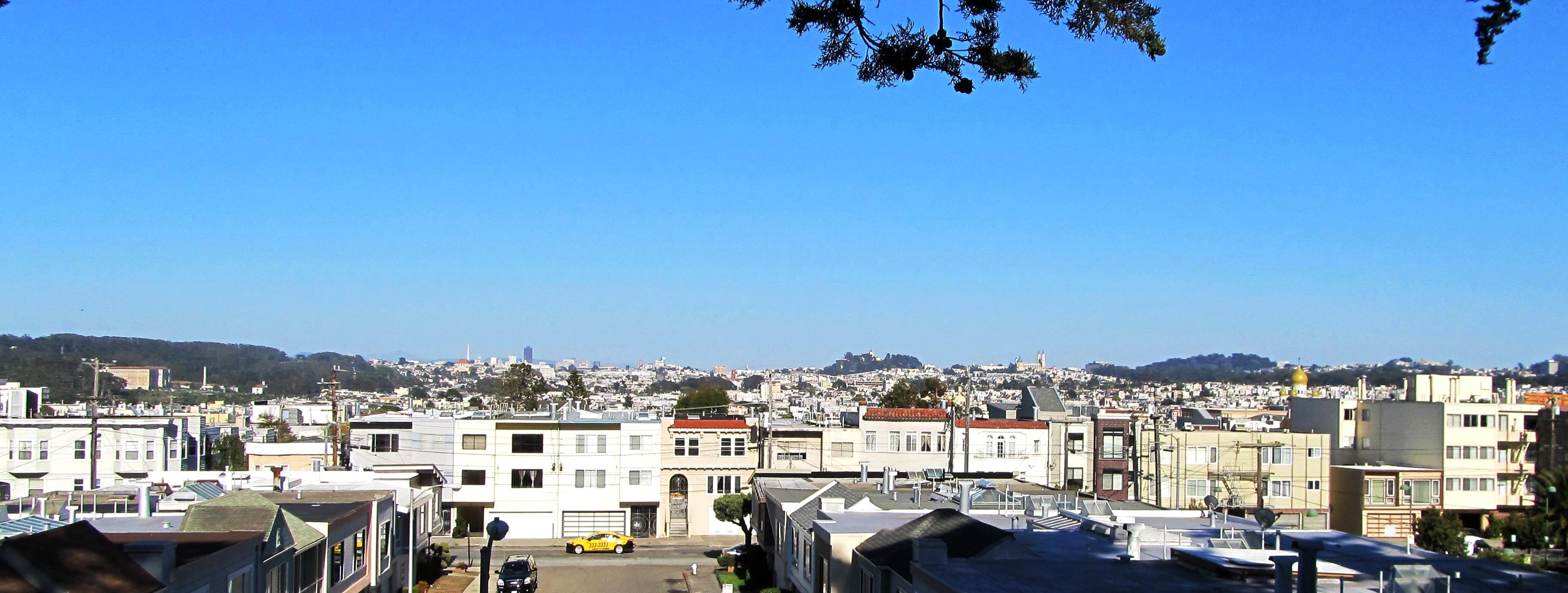
A panorama of the Richmond District as seen from the Lincoln Park golf course, facing east

Located directly north of Golden Gate Park, "the Richmond" is bounded roughly by Fulton Street to the south, Arguello Boulevard and Laurel Heights to the east, The Presidio, Lincoln Park, and Sea Cliff to the north, and Ocean Beach to the west. The western portion, "Outer Richmond", and the eastern portion, "Inner Richmond", are divided by a major thoroughfare, Park Presidio Boulevard (California State Route 1). Geary Boulevard is a major east–west thoroughfare that runs through the Richmond and to downtown.

The Richmond is easy to access by the 38R (Rapid) or 38 bus, which is around a 35 minutes bus ride from downtown running on a red bus lane. It is around a 15 minutes walk to GG Park taking the 38 bus. The 5 bus goes on Fulton to get to Golden Gate Park directly. The 31 bus runs on Balboa and the 1 bus runs on California.

== Sub-neighborhoods ==
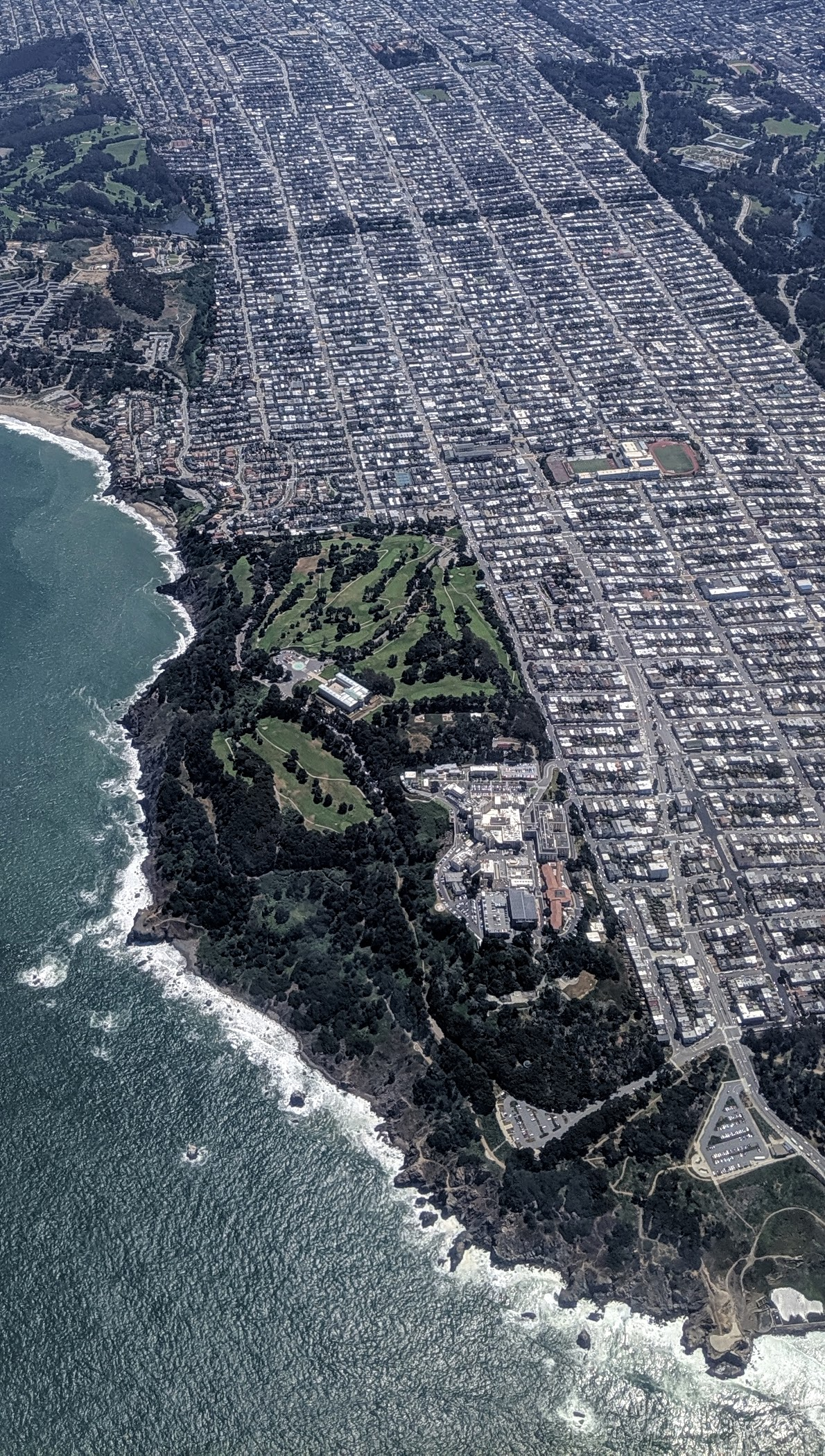
Aerial view due east of Lands End and Sea Cliff and Richmond districts, outer at lower right, inner at upper left

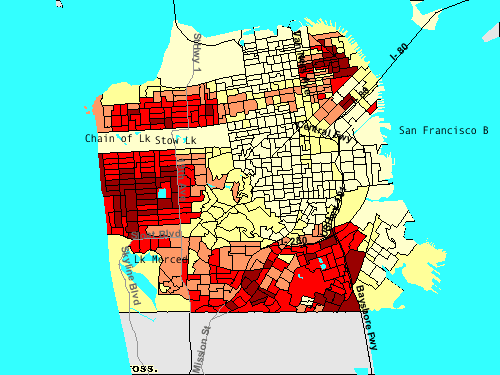
Richmond District has an Asian American population (darker colors represent a larger proportion of Asian-Americans)

The Richmond District has been colloquially divided into four parts:

Lake Street is just south of Presidio of San Francisco and north of Inner Richmond. It is an affluent area characterized by its many Victorian/Edwardian mansions. Its boundaries are: the Presidio to the north, Arguello Blvd to the east, California St. to the south, and 25th Ave. to the west. Its name is derived from its proximity to Mountain Lake, one of the few remaining natural lakes in San Francisco, and Lake Street, the neighborhood's northernmost east–west artery. Spanish explorer Juan Bautista de Anza ended his second northward expedition at the lake, stopping for two days in 1776. While here he located a site for the Spanish presidio that was later built. A plaque was placed in September 1957 near the point where he stayed.

Inner Richmond sits south of Lake Street. Its boundaries are: California St. to the north, Arguello Blvd to the east, Fulton St. to the south, and Park Presidio Blvd. to the west. The hub of the Inner Richmond is Geary Blvd & Clement St, which are particularly known for Chinese, Thai, Korean, Burmese, and Russian cuisine. The Inner Richmond is a diverse area with sizable Chinese and Russian populations.

Central Richmond is between Inner Richmond (to the east) and Outer Richmond (to the west). It is bounded by Park Presidio Blvd to the east, California St. to the north, Fulton St. to the south, and 32nd Ave. to the west. Its hub is on Geary Blvd. (between Park Presidio Blvd. to 28th Avenue). Within Central Richmond, in the area around Geary between about 17th Ave and 27th Ave, is sometimes called Little Russia.

Outer Richmond is to the west of the Central Richmond. It is bounded by Clement St. to the north, 32nd Ave. to the east, Fulton St. to the south, and Ocean Beach to the west. It borders the Ocean Beach and the Cliff House, currently operating as a restaurant. Lincoln Manor is a small enclave of larger homes within the Outer Richmond. It includes a vibrant merchant corridor on the western portion of Balboa St. from approximately 32nd Ave. to 42nd Ave. called Balboa Village.

== Streets ==
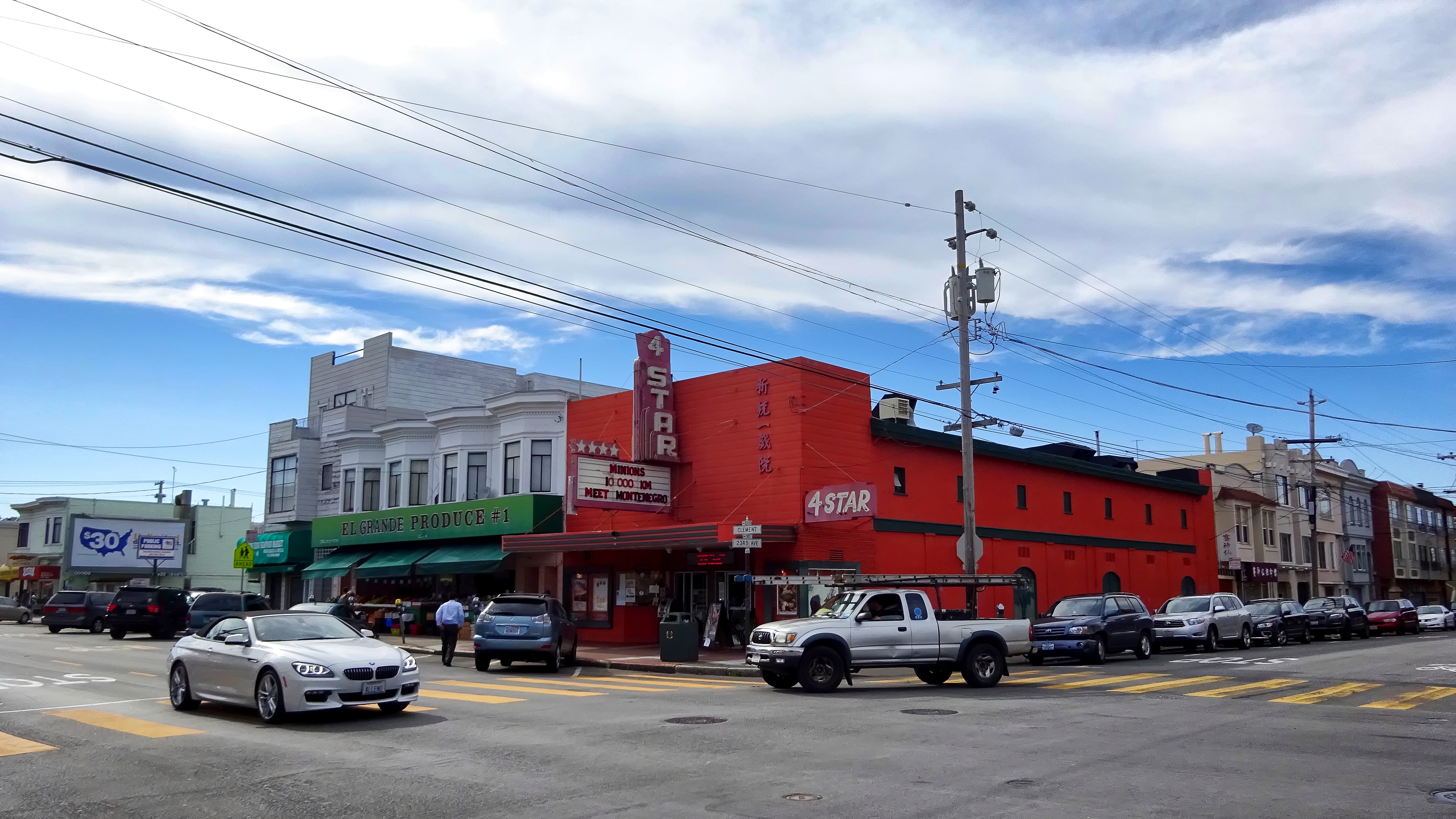
The 4 Star theater located on Clement street.

The Richmond District and the neighboring Sunset District (on the south side of Golden Gate Park) are often collectively known as "The Avenues", because a majority of both neighborhoods are spanned by numbered north–south avenues. When the city was originally laid out, the avenues were numbered from 1st to 49th and the east–west streets were lettered A to X. In 1909, to reduce confusion for mail carriers, the east–west streets and 1st Avenue and 49th Avenue were renamed. The east–west streets were named after Spanish explorers in ascending alphabetical order in a southward direction. First Avenue was renamed Arguello Boulevard and 49th Avenue was renamed La Playa Street.

Today, the first numbered avenue is 2nd Avenue, starting one block west of Arguello Boulevard, and the last is 48th Avenue near Ocean Beach. The avenue numbers increase incrementally, with the exception that what would be 13th Avenue is called Funston Avenue named for Frederick Funston, a U.S. Army general, famous for his exploits during the Spanish–American War, the Philippine–American War, and the 1906 earthquake.

Many of the east–west streets are still named after the Spanish Conquistadors, but there are exceptions. The creation of Golden Gate Park took out the streets previously lettered E through G. The former D Street became Fulton, which is the northern boundary of most of the Park.

North of the Park in the Richmond District, the streets are named Anza, Balboa, and Cabrillo.

== Parks and recreation ==
Major parks in the Richmond District include:

- Lincoln Park and Golf Course in the Outer Richmond, also the location of the California Palace of the Legion of Honor art museum.
- The historic Fort Miley Military Reservation on Point Lobos (San Francisco) is now within the Golden Gate National Recreation Area. A portion houses the large San Francisco VA Medical Center.
- Mountain Lake Park, constructed around the recently restored small lake near the Park Presidio entrance to the San Francisco Presidio park. Mountain Lake is the only natural lake in the entire 80,000-acre Golden Gate National Recreation Area, and it feeds the Presidio's Lobos Creek.
- Rochambeau Park is located between 24th and 25th Avenues, with tennis and basketball courts and play structures.
- Sutro Heights Park, the former site of silver magnate Adolph Sutro's estate, is located in the Outer Richmond District above the Cliff House.

== Education ==
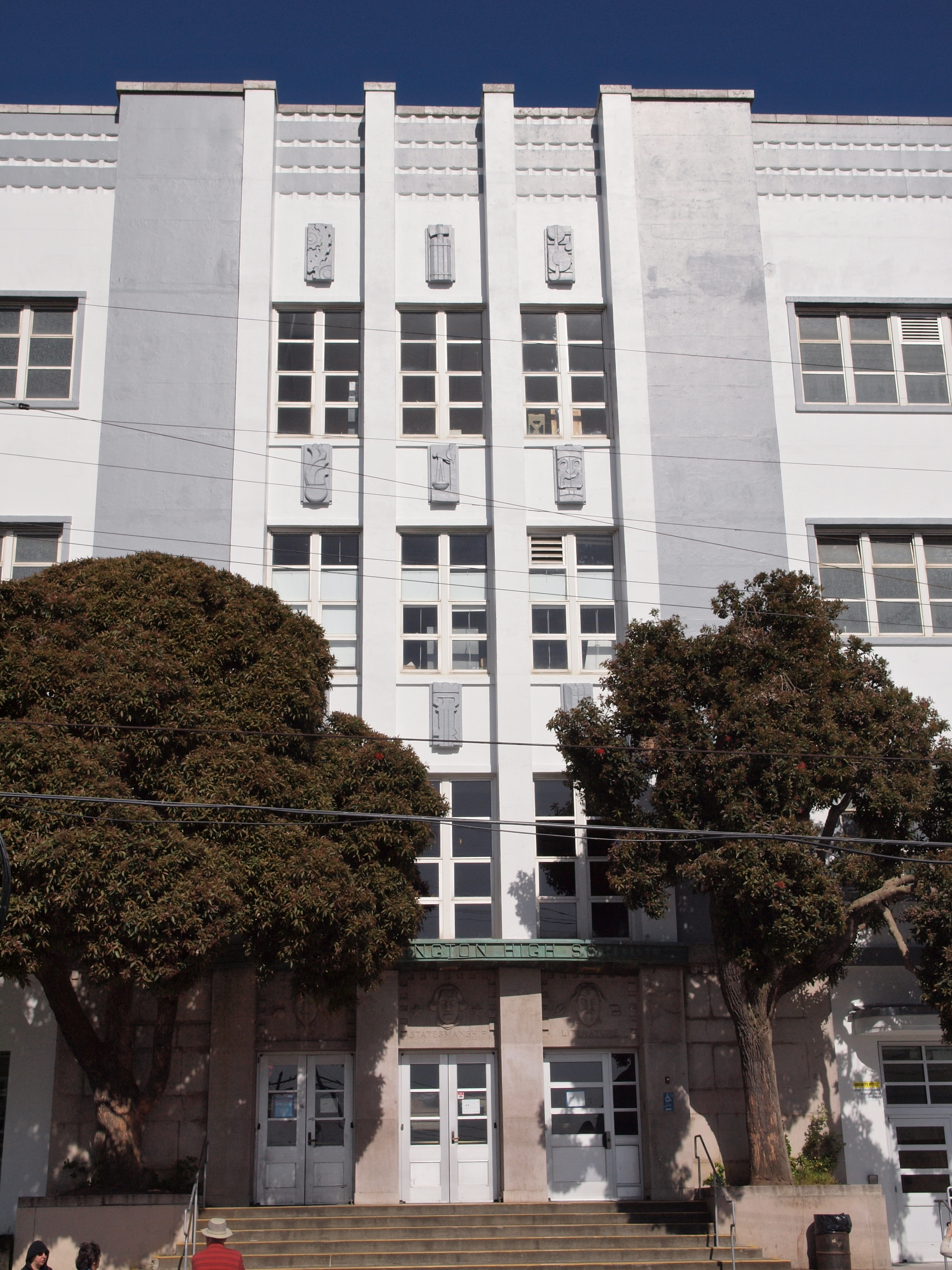
George Washington High School

The Richmond is home to San Francisco Unified School District elementary, middle and high schools. Elementary schools have distinct attendance zones.

Preschools

- Argonne Early Education School - Inner Richmond

Elementary schools

- Alamo - Established in 1926, in the center of the area.
- Argonne - In Inner Richmond
- Lafayette - In Outer Richmond
- Claire Lilienthal Alternative School (K-2 Madison Campus) - Inner Richmond
- Frank McCoppin Elementary School - Inner Richmond
- George Peabody Elementary School - Inner Richmond
- Sutro Elementary School - Inner Richmond

Middle schools

- Roosevelt Middle School
- Presidio Middle School - Outer Richmond

George Washington High School is located in Outer Richmond, at 32nd Avenue and Anza St.

Additionally, Katherine Delmar Burke School, an independent girls' school for kindergarten through eighth grade, as well as Kittredge School, a small, independent private elementary school serve the district.

The Richmond/Senator Milton Marks Branch and the Anza Branch of the San Francisco Public Library serve the Richmond District. In 1930 voters approved a city charter amendment that would increase funding to the library system so a new library could be built. John Reid, Jr., the architect, designed and landscaped the $57,117.29 new library, which was placed on the site of the former Lafayette School. On April 10, 1932, the Anza Library, the 17th municipal library branch, was dedicated. In May 2009 the library system closed the Anza Branch for repairs. A rebuilt library opened on June 18, 2011. Jing Mo Athletic Association lion dancers provided entertainment at the ceremony.

== Climate ==
Climate data for Richmond District, San Francisco
Month	Jan	Feb	Mar	Apr	May	Jun	Jul	Aug	Sep	Oct	Nov	Dec	Year
Record high °F (°C)	79 (26)	77 (25)	81 (27)	90 (32)	98 (37)	88 (31)	86 (30)	95 (35)	96 (36)	99 (37)	85 (29)	73 (23)	99 (37)
Mean daily maximum °F (°C)	57.6 (14.2)	59.4 (15.2)	59.8 (15.4)	60.4 (15.8)	60.6 (15.9)	62.0 (16.7)	62.7 (17.1)	64.0 (17.8)	65.6 (18.7)	65.7 (18.7)	62.2 (16.8)	57.6 (14.2)	61.5 (16.4)
Daily mean °F (°C)	50.9 (10.5)	52.6 (11.4)	53.2 (11.8)	54.0 (12.2)	55.1 (12.8)	56.9 (13.8)	58.1 (14.5)	59.3 (15.2)	59.9 (15.5)	58.9 (14.9)	55.2 (12.9)	51.1 (10.6)	55.4 (13.0)
Mean daily minimum °F (°C)	44.2 (6.8)	45.9 (7.7)	46.5 (8.1)	47.6 (8.7)	49.6 (9.8)	51.5 (10.8)	53.4 (11.9)	54.6 (12.6)	54.2 (12.3)	52.2 (11.2)	48.2 (9.0)	44.5 (6.9)	49.4 (9.7)
Record low °F (°C)	29 (−2)	29 (−2)	29 (−2)	35 (2)	36 (2)	35 (2)	44 (7)	34 (1)	31 (−1)	39 (4)	33 (1)	25 (−4)	25 (−4)
Average precipitation inches (mm)	3.99 (101)	3.55 (90)	2.81 (71)	1.23 (31)	0.49 (12)	0.15 (3.8)	0.02 (0.51)	0.08 (2.0)	0.16 (4.1)	1.08 (27)	2.66 (68)	3.77 (96)	19.99 (506.41)
Average precipitation days (≥ 0.01 in)	11	10	9	5	3	1	0	1	1	3	8	10	62
Source: Western Regional Climate Center

== Landmarks and points of interest ==
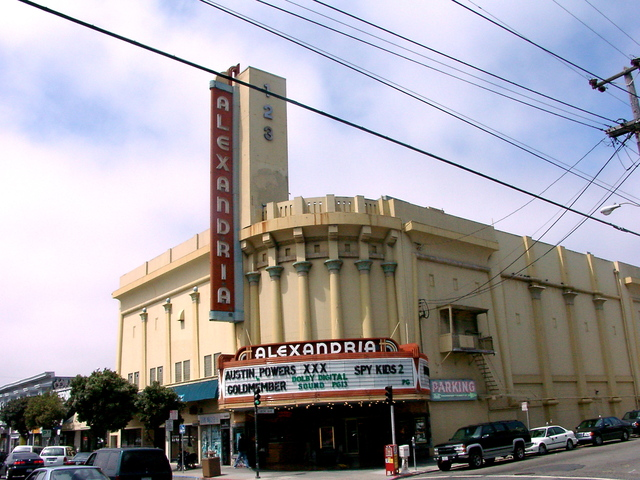

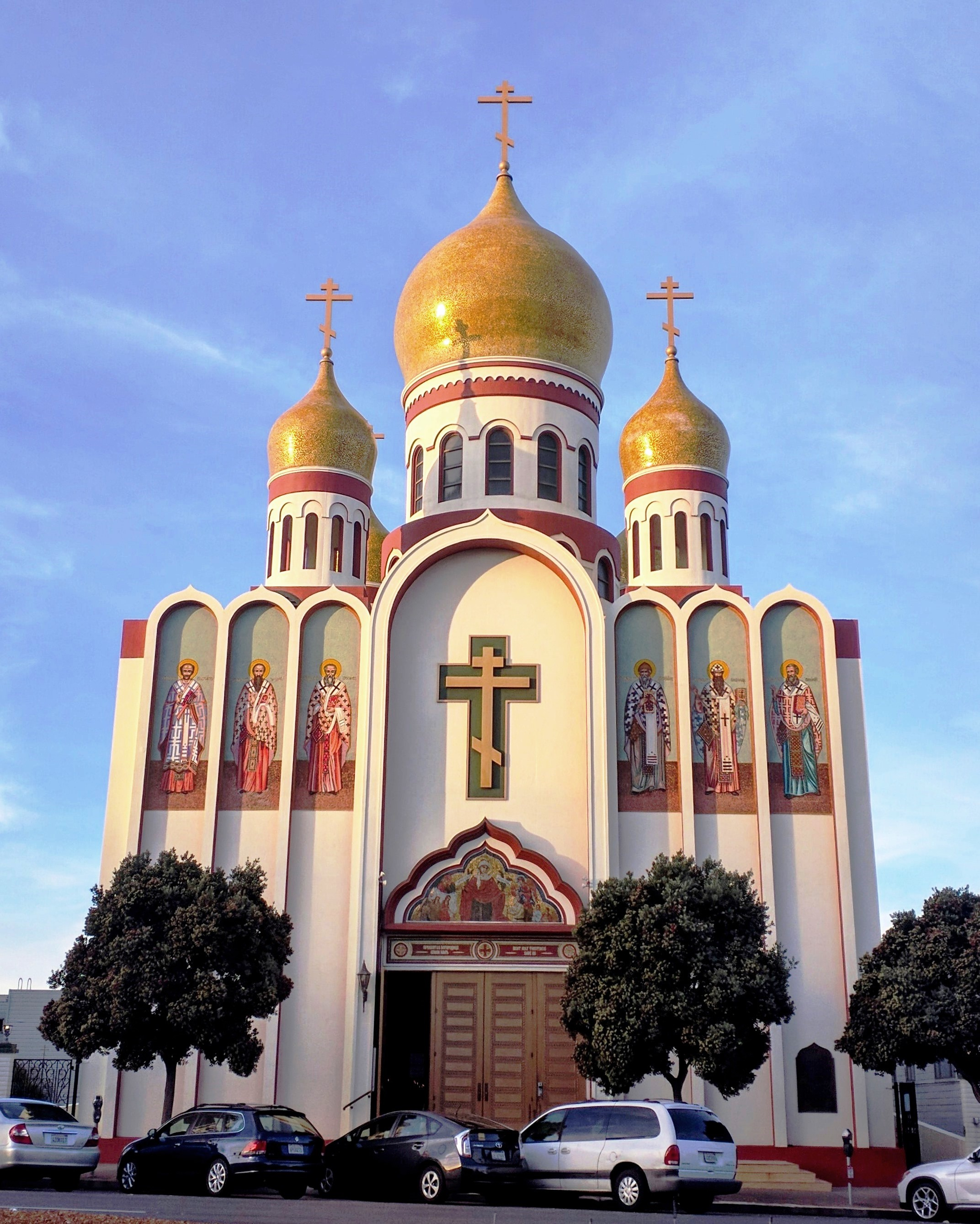

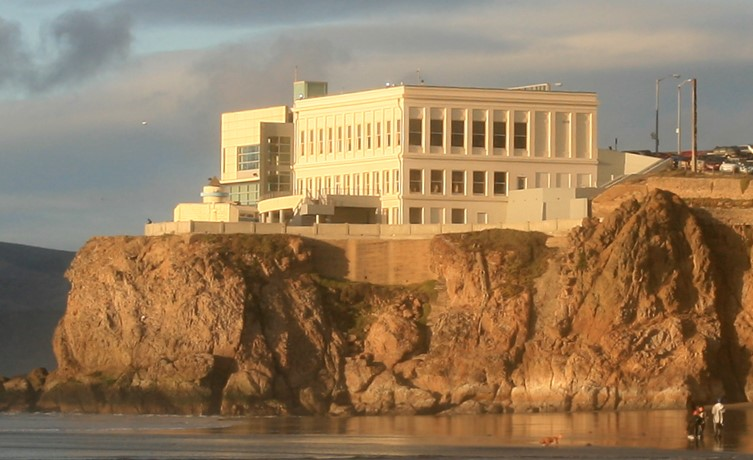

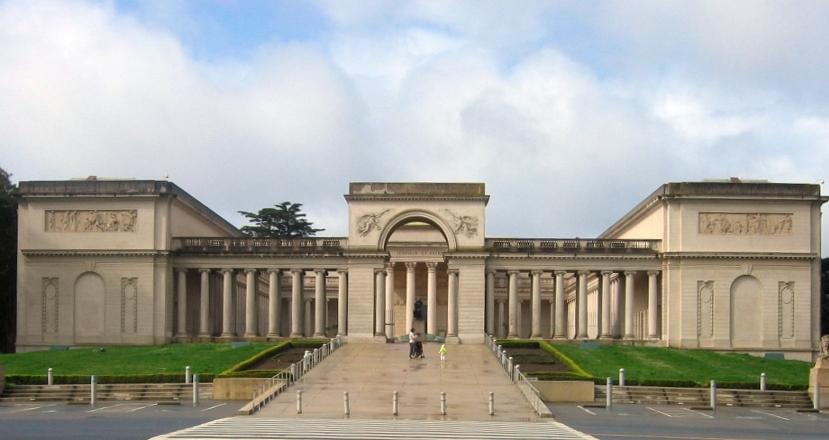

- Alexandria Theater
- Baker Beach
- Balboa Theater (San Francisco)
- Cliff House
- Holy Virgin Cathedral
- Legion of Honor (museum)
- Ocean Beach
- Sutro Baths

== See also ==
- Internet Archive - a nonprofit digital library whose headquarters is situated in this district
- The Chutes of San Francisco
