= Coronet Theatre (San Francisco) =

Movie theater in San Francisco, California, US (1949–2005)

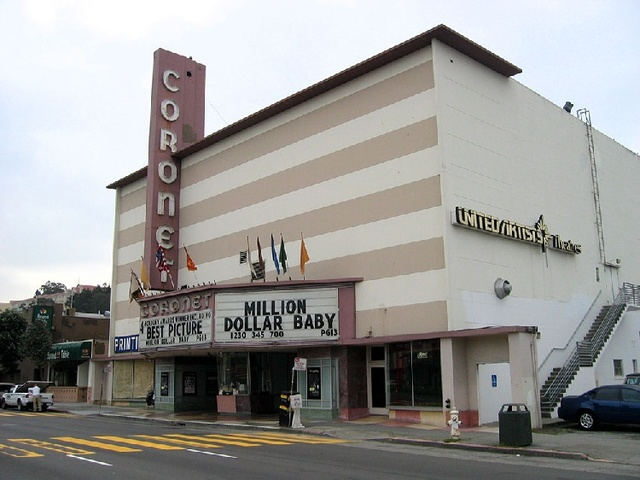
- Interactive map of Coronet Theatre
- Former names: Coronet Theater
- Location: 3575 Geary Boulevard, San Francisco, California, USA
- Coordinates: 37.781234°N 122.457542°W
- Owner: United Artists
- Operator: United Artists
- Seating type: Fixed
- Capacity: 1,350
- Type: movie theater

Construction
- Opened: November 2, 1949
- Closed: March 17, 2005
- Demolished: July 2007
- Architects: Cantin & Cantin

The Coronet Theatre was a historic single screen movie theater located at 3575 Geary Boulevard in San Francisco’s Richmond District.

== History and architecture ==
The Coronet opened on November 2, 1949, and was designed by noted theater architects Cantin & Cantin in the Streamline Moderne style. The theater was owned and operated by the Levin family which also owned many neighborhood theaters in the city including the Alexandria, Coliseum, Balboa, and El Rey. Sometime in the 1960s it was sold to United Artists.

The auditorium was one of the largest in the city, seating approximately 1,200 to 1,350 patrons in a combination of orchestra seating and a loge section, which offered stadium style elevated sight lines unusual for theaters of the late 1940s. The Coronet was equipped with a large curved screen and state-of the art projection and sound systems, which were periodically updated over the decades to maintain top tier sound quality.

Inside, the auditorium was known for its elegant Moderne design. A large wall mural depicting a regal or mythic figure served as the visual centerpiece of the interior décor. The combination of technical presentation, modern design, and spacious seating made the Coronet one of San Francisco’s premier film exhibition venues.

=== Prestige first-run engagements (1950s–1960s) ===
Throughout the 1950s and 1960s, the Coronet was regarded as one of the city’s most important houses for first-run, roadshow, and prestige film engagements. Major studio epics and musicals played extended engagements at the theater, including Oklahoma!, Ben-Hur, My Fair Lady, and other large scale productions that benefited from the Coronet’s curved screen and powerful sound system.

During this period, the theater developed a regional reputation among moviegoers for high quality projection, comfortable seating, and consistent presentation standards, putting it on par with San Francisco’s downtown movie palaces (i.e. Fox Theatre, Paramount Theater) despite its neighborhood location in the Richmond District.

== Star Wars and cultural significance ==
The Coronet Theatre became associated with the Star Wars franchise beginning in 1977, when Star Wars opened in San Francisco. While not the world premiere location, the Coronet was the most prominent theater in Northern California to screen the film during its original release, and many Bay Area residents experienced Star Wars for the first time at the Coronet. Reports from the period describe lines stretching around the block, with the theater running the film for weeks as it became a regional phenomenon.

Its sustained success with Star Wars helped solidify the Coronet’s status as a cultural hub for science-fiction and blockbuster filmgoing in San Francisco and the region at large. The theater continued to host re-releases, special editions, and anniversary screenings of the original Star Wars trilogy throughout the 1980s and 1990s.

Local lore has it that George Lucas considered the Coronet his favorite theater, praising its projection quality and presentation standards. This connection between Lucasfilm and the Coronet was further highlighted when the theater hosted significant local screenings, including a high-demand showing of Star Wars: Episode I – The Phantom Menace in 1999, which drew crowds reminiscent of the 1977 original release.

Because of this long standing association, the Coronet remains one of the most historically significant Star Wars exhibition venues in the United States.

== Sale, closure, and demolition ==
The Coronet’s decline began in the late 1990s and early 2000s as multiplexes became dominant in San Francisco’s movie market. The property was eventually sold to the Institute on Aging in 2000. The theatre ceased operations on March 17, 2005, after 56 years.

The building was demolished in 2007, and the site was redeveloped into the Institute of Aging, a senior home health care service.

=== Community reaction ===
The demolition of the Coronet generated significant local criticism, much of it centered on concerns that the removal of the historic theater represented a loss of cultural space in the Richmond District. Preservation advocates argued that the Coronet was an architecturally distinctive neighborhood landmark and one of the last major single screen theaters remaining in San Francisco. Critics contended that replacing the theater with a private senior retirement home provided little benefit to younger residents or the broader neighborhood, and contributed to the long term disappearance of communal moviegoing spaces and cultural institutions in the city.

== See also ==
- Alexandria Theater (San Francisco)
