= New Musical Theater of San Francisco, Inc. =

New Musical Theater of San Francisco was a non-profit corporation that produces original musicals at 414 Mason Street in San Francisco, California. It was founded in 2001 by Anne Nygren Doherty and John Doherty. In has produced a number of musicals, including "Musical Genius" and "Absolutely San Francisco". It has also produced cabaret shows such as "Round One Cabaret: Taking Charge in a Crazy World".

== See also ==
- Musical Theater
