= Alexandria Theater (San Francisco) =

Movie theater in San Francisco, California, USA (1923–2004)

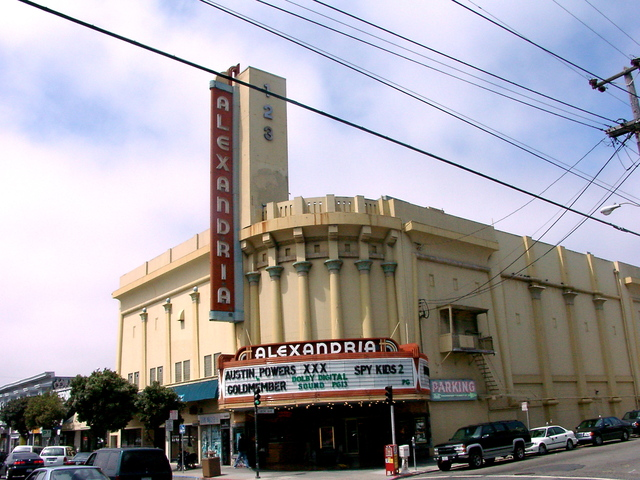
- Interactive map of Alexandria Theater (San Francisco)
- Former names: Alexandria Egyptian Theater, UA Alexandria, Alexandria Theatre
- Location: 5400 Geary Boulevard, San Francisco, California, USA
- Coordinates: 37.780794°N 122.477548°W
- Owner: Regal Entertainment Group
- Operator: Regal Entertainment Group
- Seating type: Fixed
- Capacity: 2,000
- Type: movie theater

Construction
- Opened: November 26, 1923
- Renovated: 1942, and 1976
- Closed: February 16, 2004
- Architect: Reid & Reid

The Alexandria Theater was a historic movie palace located at 5400 Geary Boulevard in San Francisco’s Richmond District that operated from 1923 to 2004. It is also known as the Alexandria Theatre, Alexandria Egyptian Theater, and UA Alexandria.

== History and architecture ==
The Alexandria Theater opened on November 26, 1923, and was designed by the architecture firm Reid & Reid, who built landmarks such as the Cliff House, Fairmont Hotel and Spreckels Temple of Music. The Alexandria was built in the Egyptian Revival style, which reflected the era's fascination with Egypt following the discovery of Tutankhamun's tomb in 1922. The lobby and auditorium included Egyptian-themed murals, decorative columns, and hieroglyphic motifs. The theater was founded by the chain Samuel H. Levin Theaters, who also owned and operated other nearby neighborhood theaters such as the Coronet, Coliseum, Balboa, and Harding Theater; and was owned by George A. Oppenheimer and Alex E. Levin.

=== Remodel, 1942 ===
In 1942, the Alexandria reopened after a year long remodel that updated the exterior and interior to a Streamline Moderne aesthetic. The facade was modernized with a new vertical blade sign, as well as a new marquee with neon lighting and chrome accents. Inside, the auditorium received updated seating, sound equipment, and a tonned down Egyptian theme by removing some of the original decorative ornamentation. This remodel brought the theater in line with mid-century modern taste and maintained its status as one of the premier neighborhood theaters in the city.

=== Triplex conversion, 1976 ===
The Alexandria underwent its largest remodel in 1976 when it divided its main auditorium into three theaters. The original main auditorium on the ground floor was kept, but the balcony (loge) section was divided into two smaller auditoriums.

Through the 1980s and 1990s, Regal Entertainment Group operated the Alexandria and it remained a popular first run theater and continued to screen major studio releases well into the multiplex era.

=== Closure ===
On February 16, 2004, after 80 years of operation, the Alexandria Theater closed permanently. Regal sold the property to a private investment group before the closure. The final screenings drew significant local press attention and nostalgic crowds, many of whom had frequented the Alexandria for decades.

== Post-closure ==
Since its closure in 2004, the Alexandria has remained vacant, and has deteriorated. It became one of the Richmond District's most visible examples of architectural neglect and urban blight. Broken windows, water intrusion, facade decay, and repeated graffiti vandalism over the decades has been documented by neighborhood groups and local journalists.

Despite its history and architectural importance, the Alexandria has not been granted San Francisco Landmark status. Preservationists argue the Alexandria is an example of the city's failure to protect historically significant structures.

=== Sign incident, 2023 ===
In January 2023, following a severe winter windstorm, the theater's massive vertical blade sign partially detached from the building's structure and was reported to be at risk of collapsing onto Geary Boulevard. City officials closed portions of the street as a safety precaution and an emergency crew was sent to dismantle and remove the remaining unstable sections of the historic sign. The near collapse of the sign was widely covered in local media and drew intense criticism from neighborhood residents, many of whom argued that the hazardous condition resulted from years of owner inaction, lack of basic upkeep, and deliberate neglect that allowed the building to deteriorate.

=== Redevelopment ===
Multiple developers have proposed renovations or mixed use projects over the past 20 years. Earlier plans incorporated partial restoration of the auditorium and preserving the buildings exterior facade.

In May 2025, the San Francisco Board of Supervisors approved the creation of a special district that would allow the former theater to be redeveloped into an eight-story building with 75 apartments. The theaters murals and ornate chandelier would be destroyed in the process and not preserved. This news sparked renewed community concern and criticism, as many residents view the Alexandria as an important architectural work by Reid & Reid and a symbol of the Richmond District's cultural identity. Preservation advocates argue that the Alexandria's over 100 year legacy, neighborhood significance, and architectural value warrant full restoration rather than demolition.

== Cultural impact ==
The Alexandria was considered a neighborhood icon, it has been featured in books, oral histories, and even public art, such as the mural by artist Bryana Fleming depicting the Alexandria on the wall of the Grocery Outlet located at Geary Boulevard and 28th Avenue. The Alexandria is one of the last remaining movie palace buildings in the city.
