= El Rey Theatre (San Francisco) =

1931 historic building in California

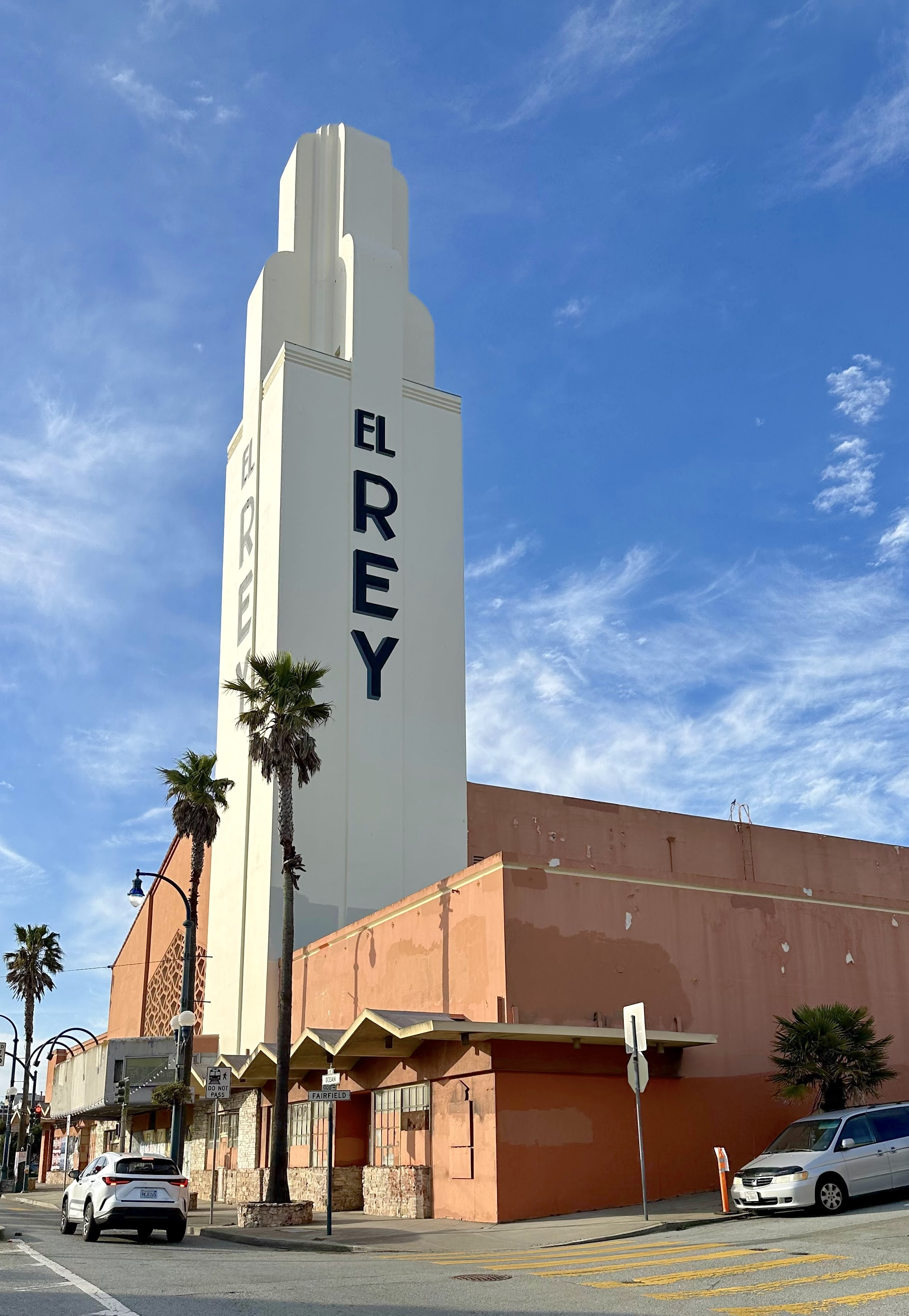
- El Rey Theatre in 2024

- Location within San Francisco County Location within California
- 37.7264°N 122.4640°W
- Location: 1970 Ocean Avenue, San Francisco, California, United States

History
- Built: 1931

Site notes
- Architect: Timothy L. Pflueger
- Architectural styles: Art Deco-Moderne, Spanish-Colonial Revival

San Francisco Designated Landmark
- Designated: July 27, 2017
- Reference no.: 274

El Rey Theatre is a historic theater building in the Ingleside Terraces neighborhood of San Francisco, California, United States. The building is listed by the city as a San Francisco Designated Landmark since 2017.

== History ==
The Balboa Theater (opened in 1926) at 1634 Ocean Avenue had preceded the El Rey in the Ingleside Terraces neighborhood.

The Art Deco–Moderne El Rey Theatre building was designed by local architect Timothy L. Pflueger. It contains a 150 feet (46 m) tower, and the tower once contained an aircraft beacon, and neon lights. The El Rey Theatre opened on November 14, 1931, and had 1,800 seats. The opening show was The Smiling Lieutenant (1931), starring Maurice Chevalier.

In 1949, the building was remodeled by architect Vincent G. Raney. One of the retail spaces next door to the theater was the first location of The Gap (now Gap Inc.) in 1969. In April 1, 1977, the theater closed.

In 2016, the building was sold at auction to the "Voice of the Pentecost or A Place to Meet Jesus" church, which later defaulted on their mortgage. Since 2021, the former theater building has been slated for redevelopment into a multi-unit housing building.

In 2025, the building was purchased by "The Father’s House SF" church.

== See also ==
- List of San Francisco Designated Landmarks
