= Carville, San Francisco =

Neighborhood of San Francisco

Coordinates: 37.75668°N 122.50676°W

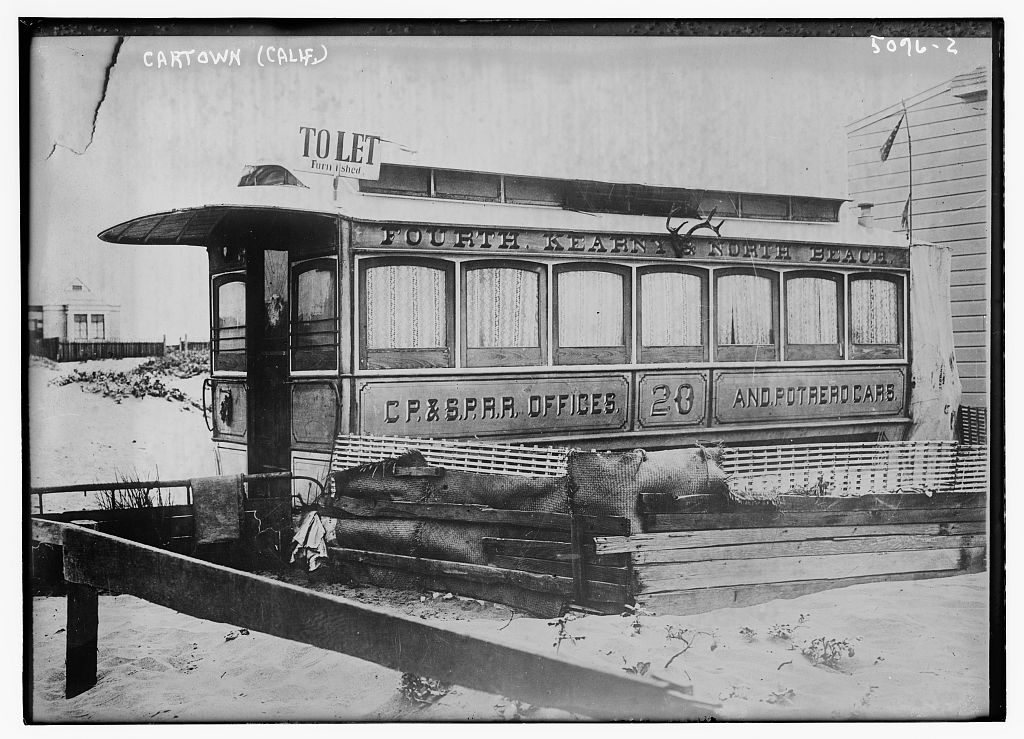
Carville horsecar in 1920

Carville, also known as Carville-by-the-Sea and Cartown, was an impromptu neighborhood in the late 19th and early 20th centuries in what is now the Outer Sunset District of San Francisco, California. Residents reused abandoned horsecars (horse-drawn trolleys) and, later, cable cars for housing and public buildings. Carville was located near the intersection of 47th Ave. and Lawton Streets, just south of the western end of Golden Gate Park.

== History ==
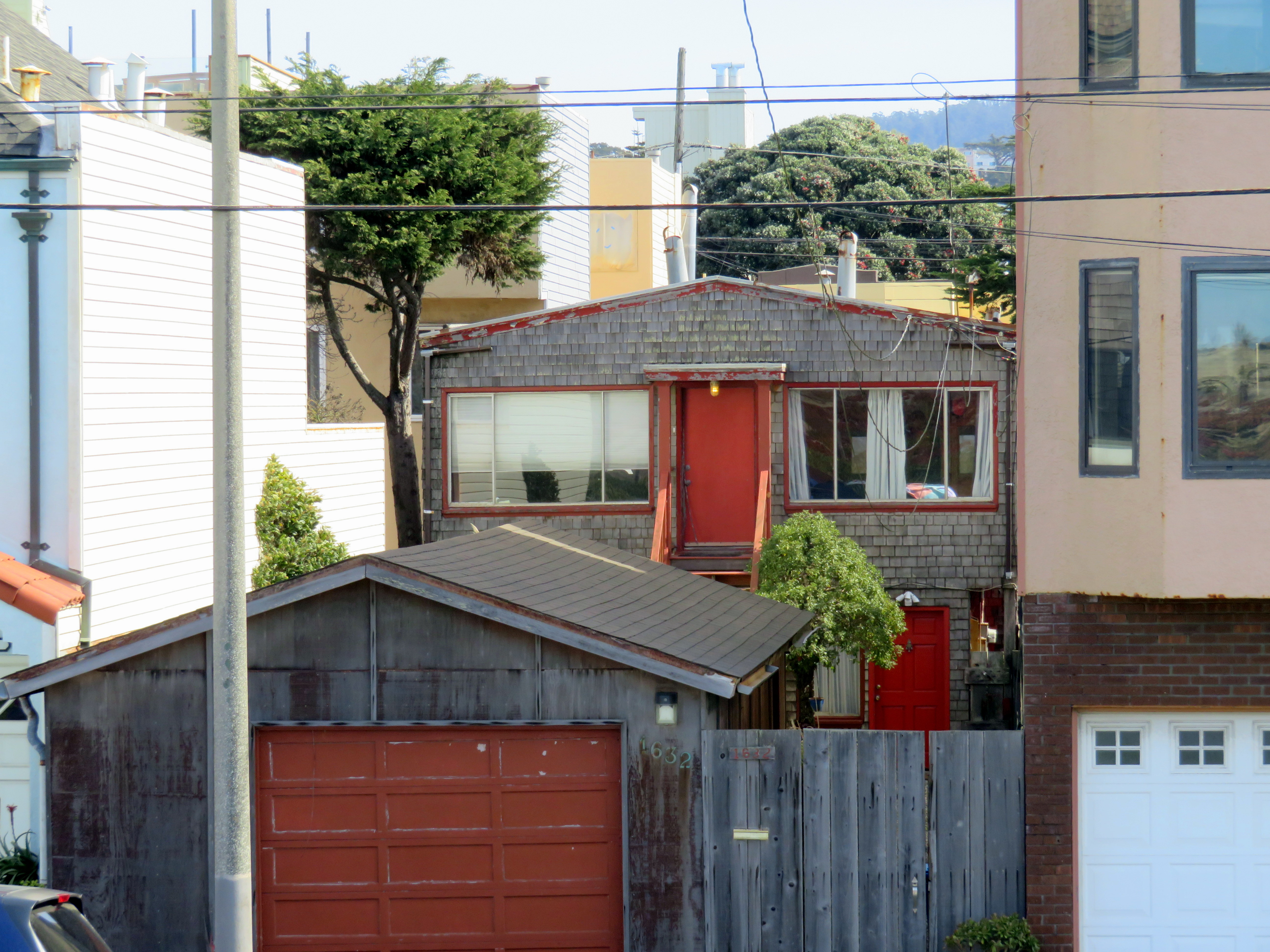
A remaining Carville house, photographed in 2018

In the 1850s and 1860s local San Francisco transit companies used horse-drawn railcars on city streets. The arrival of cable cars and electric streetcars spelled the doom of the equine-pulled variety. In 1895 the Market Street Railway Company placed a newspaper advertisement in the San Francisco Examiner offering horsecars for $20 (Note: $774 in 2025 adjusted for inflation) ($10 (Note: $387 in 2025 adjusted for inflation) without seats). By September of that year the cars were already put to a wide variety of uses, including a backyard children's playhouse, a real estate office, a shoemaker's shop, and a shelter for poor people in North Beach. Colonel Charles Dailey had moved with his wife in 1893 to a hut on a plot rented from Adolph Sutro in the then-unsettled expanse of sand dunes near Ocean Beach. He rented a horse car from Sutro and in it opened "The Annex", a "coffee saloon", catering to day trippers taking the Park and Ocean Railroad out of the city to the beach and the Cliff House. This became the nucleus of a colony of former cars near the Great Highway, especially after real-estate agent Jacob Heyman started advertising lots for $7.50 (Note: $269 in 2025 adjusted for inflation) a month rental, $35 (Note: $1254 in 2025 adjusted for inflation) including two horse cars. By 1897 the area had become known as "Carville-by-the-Sea" or simply "Carville".

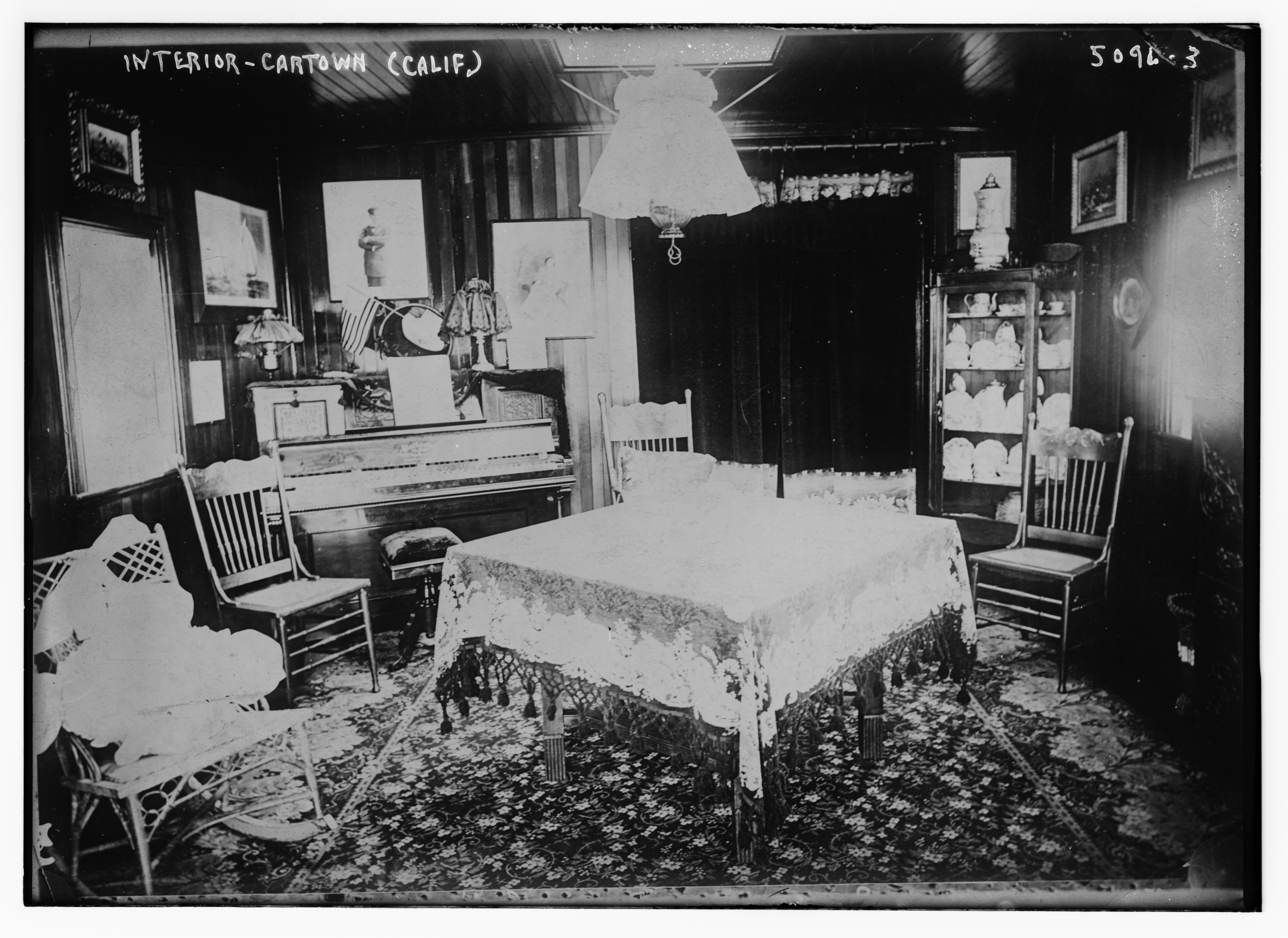
An interior, prob. 1910-1920

Cars became both housing and businesses. Some were used singly, while other owners assembled as many as ten to make up multi-storied structures and U-shaped buildings with courtyards. These included St. Andrews by the Sea Episcopal Church, apparently made from North Beach and Mission line horsecars. Even when the cars were subsumed into more conventional structures, their shape could often be detected from the inside.

Carville attracted Bohemians as well as poor people. One Dr. Cross ran a clubhouse frequented by Jack London, Gelett Burgess, Xavier Martínez, and George Sterling among others, and a group of musicians ran one named La Bohème, which hosted touring visitors from New York's Metropolitan Opera. Heyman laid on a water supply from a well and by 1900 the rental price of a lot and two cars was $600. (Note: $23220 in 2025 adjusted for inflation)

The estimated population of Carville was 2,000 in 1900. However, as San Francisco grew the once unwanted property surrounding and within Carville became desirable. The Oceanside Improvement Club adopted the motto "Make clean today by sweeping and burning up the debris of yesterday" and in 1913 held a ceremonial burning of four of the cars. Most of the neighborhood disappeared by the 1920s.

While it is possible that a number of Carville-style structures still exist in the area, only one is widely known.
