= Ocean Beach, San Francisco =

Beach on the west coast of San Francisco, California, bordering the Pacific Ocean

Coordinates: 37°45′34″N 122°30′39″W

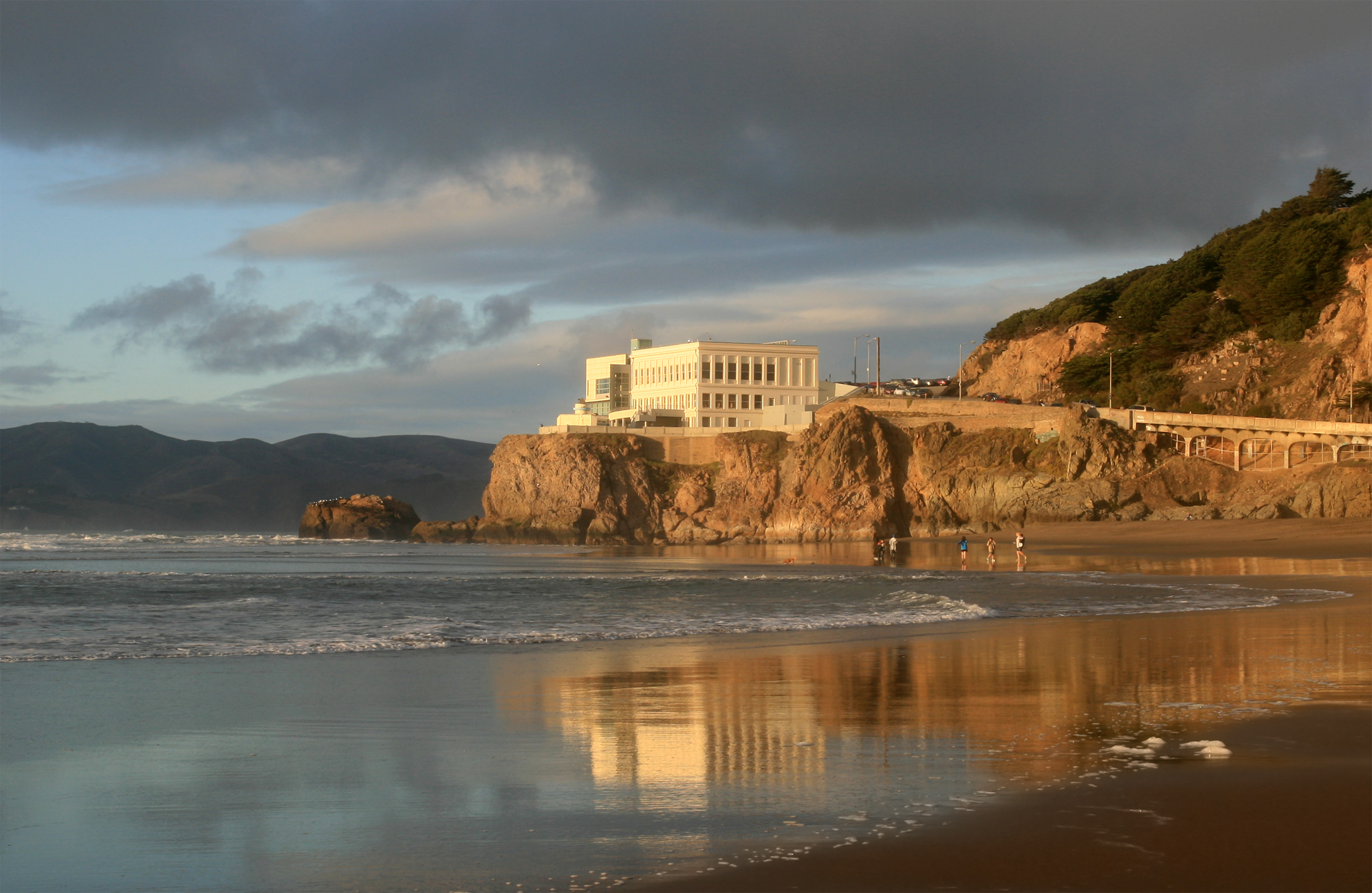
Cliff House from Ocean Beach

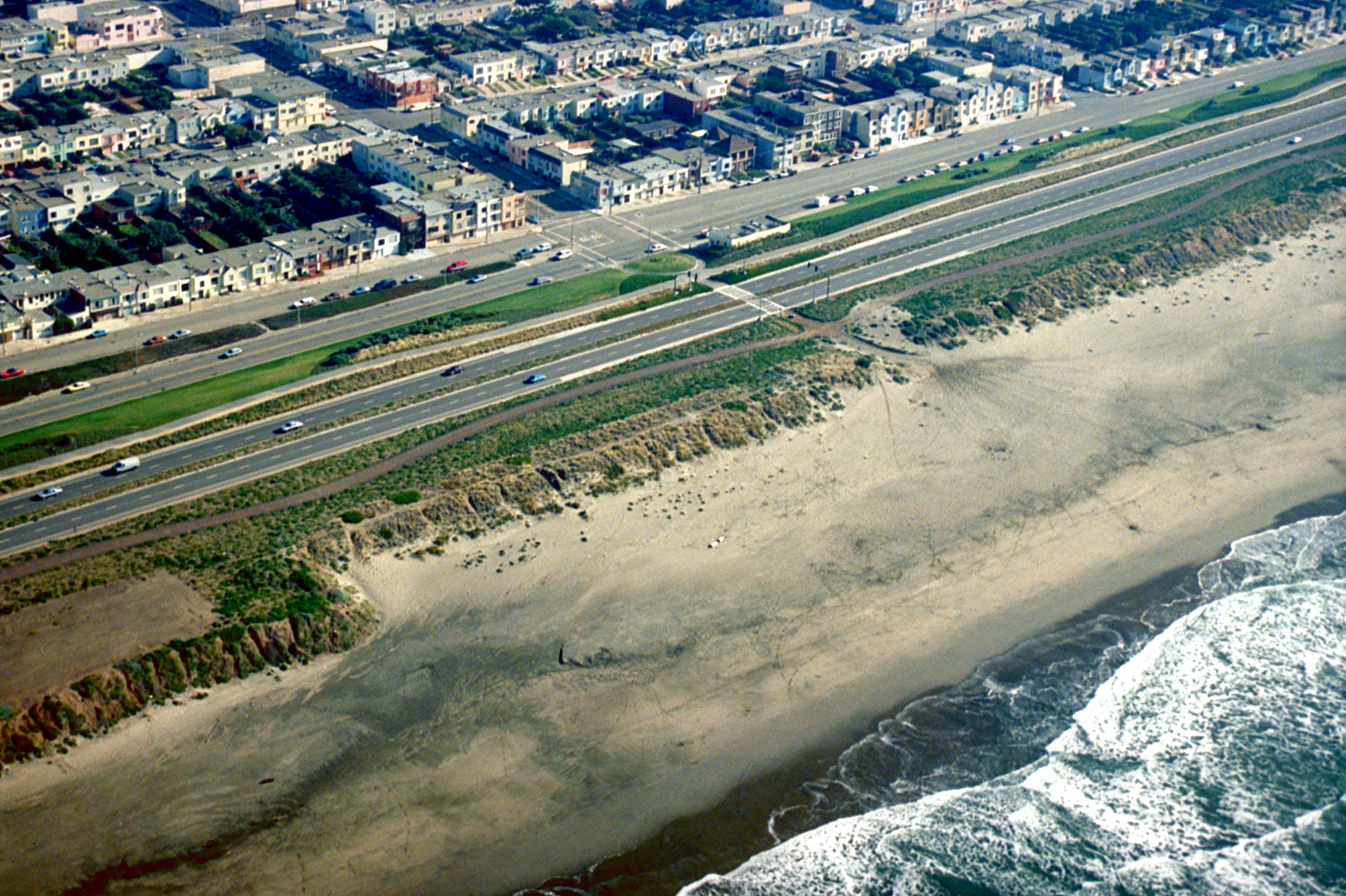
Aerial view of the Ocean Beach neighborhood at Taraval Street

Ocean Beach is a beach on the west coast of San Francisco, California, United States. Bordering the Pacific Ocean, the beach is 3.5 miles long, and it is known for its strong currents, surf culture, foggy weather in the late spring and summer, and lack of high rise buildings. Located on the city's West Side, Ocean Beach is adjacent to Golden Gate Park, Sutro Heights Park, the Richmond District, and the Sunset District. The Great Highway runs alongside the beach, and the Cliff House and the site of the former Sutro Baths sit at the northern end. The beach is a part of the Golden Gate National Recreation Area, which is administered by the National Park Service. It is accessible via Muni Metro at the Judah and La Playa station.

During the late spring and summer, San Francisco's characteristic foggy weather frequently envelops the beach. The average temperature for the last 5 years has been 13.2 °C (55.8 °F). Most of the beach-friendly weather occurs in the fall (usually mid to late September) and early in the spring when fog and strong sea breezes are less prevalent. Dry winter days also tend to provide excellent weather at Ocean Beach (especially in drought years).

The water at Ocean Beach is noteworthy for its strong, dangerous currents and powerful waves, which make it popular among serious surfers. Currents can exceed 2.5 meters per second in the inlet throat, 1.5 meters per second at the extreme north end of the beach, and .5 meters per second at the extreme south end of the beach. The water is cold, due in part to a process known as upwelling, in which frigid water from below the ocean surface rises to replace the surface water that moves away from the beach as a result of the Coriolis effect. The rapid rip currents, cold water, and threat of sneaker waves make the ocean dangerous for casual swimmers and even those who simply want to set foot in it, especially those without wetsuits and lifejackets, because swimmers and even waders have been swept away and drowned. The southern portion of the beach by Sloat Boulevard has some of the cleanest water in the state.

== Animals and ecosystem ==
The beach is often covered with sand dollars (specifically, the Dendraster excentricus). Velella can be found washed up in the spring and early summer. The Western Snowy Plover rests at the beach for 10 months of the year. Dungeness crabs are fished by some locals. Bottlenose dolphins can be found in the water. Although they are traditionally found in Southern California and the Baja California peninsula in Mexico, they have migrated north in recent decades, as water temperatures have risen in Central California and Northern California.

== Surfing ==
The beach is one of the Bay Area's top surfing spots and — when breaking well — can be world class, especially during large swells in the winter months. In the 1940s, surfing first began at Kelly's Cove (a section of the beach that is south of the Cliff House). Jack O'Neill opened his first surf shop at Ocean Beach in 1952. Before wetsuits were developed, surfers could only go into the water for short periods, due to the cold water.

Ocean Beach is known for its strong, multi-directional swells. Surfers and other swimmers have died at Ocean Beach; one example occurred in May 2006, with the next-previous death taking place in January 2006. Prior to that, it had been about five years since a death at Ocean Beach. In 1998, a record seven people lost their lives there. In November 2023, surfer Kirby Lee died due to a surfing accident at Ocean Beach.

The Ocean Beach surfing community is served by four surf shops and several popular beach-themed cafes. Seal Rock is a prominent local feature of the area. Third Eye Blind's "Motorcycle Drive By" was written about this beach.

On November 6, 2011, Ocean Beach hosted the Rip Curl Pro surfing competition, in which Kelly Slater won his 11th ASP world championship at the age of 39. This was the only one of his championships won in the continental United States.

== History ==
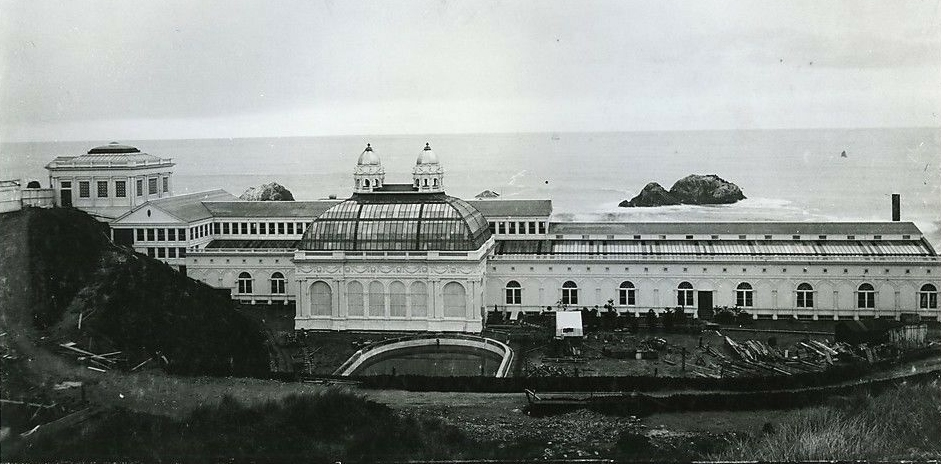
Sutro Baths in 1896

Due in part to its sometimes inhospitable weather (high winds, cold weather and fog), the area was largely undeveloped throughout most of San Francisco's early history, when it was known as part of the "Outside Lands." Development finally came in the late 19th century: a steam railroad was in place by 1884 to bring people to the first amusement ride at the city's oceanside, a "Gravity Railroad" roller coaster, and to the Ocean Beach Pavilion for concerts and dancing. By 1890, trolley lines reached Ocean Beach: the Ferries and Cliff House Railroad, Park and Ocean Railroad, and Sutro Railroad that encouraged commercial amusement development as a trolley park. The Cliff House, which opened in 1863, and Sutro Baths, which opened in 1896, drew thousands of visitors.

=== Railroads ===
The Park and Ocean Railroad ran along Lincoln Way on the south edge of Golden Gate Park and then turned north into the western end of the Park along La Playa Street. This standard-gauge railway began service on December 1, 1883. It became part of the Haight streetcar line. The Ferries & Cliff House Railway ran west along California Street and then along the coast to turn south on 48th Avenue.

=== Telegraph Line ===
The first section of cable for the Commercial Pacific Cable Company was laid in 1902 by the cable ship CS Silvertown from Ocean Beach, adjacent to the famous Cliff House in San Francisco to Honolulu.

=== Resort era ===
Playland, San Francisco in 1918

Following a brief stint as a refugee camp after the 1906 earthquake, the area was touted as a resort. A small amusement park, Playland at the Beach, was built where Cabrillo and Balboa streets now end. Major development occurred in the 1920s and 1930s with construction of the Great Highway and housing in the adjacent Sunset and Richmond Districts. After the destruction of the Sutro Baths in 1966, the neighborhood lost its resort appeal; the amusement park was also torn down in 1972, to be replaced by apartment blocks and a supermarket in the 1990s.

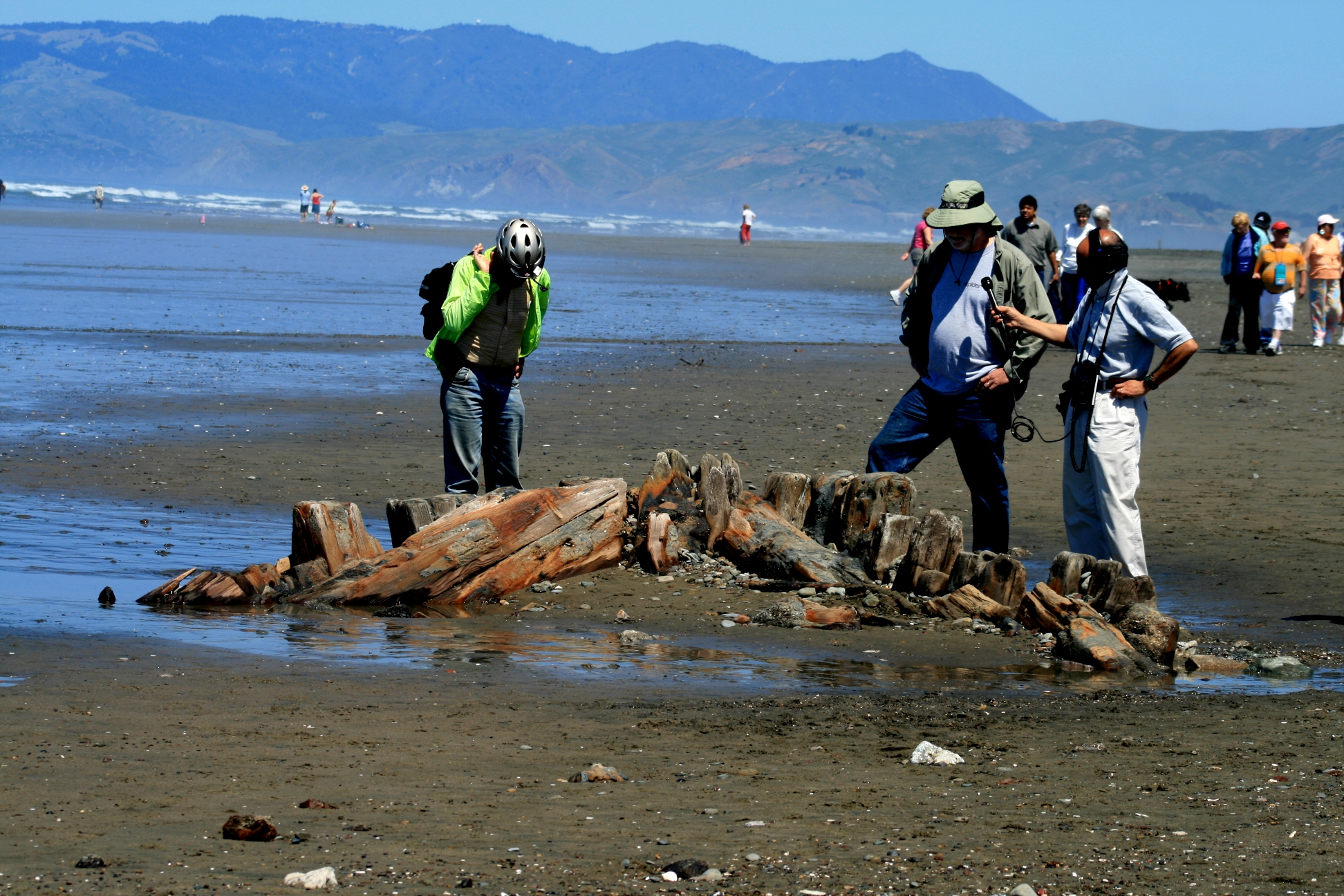
The shipwreck of the King Philip in May 2007

On January 25, 1878, the King Philip, a three-masted clipper ship, drifted onto Ocean Beach and foundered. From time to time, the wreckage of the ship still emerges from the sands just offshore, most recently reappearing in November 2010.

=== Climate change adaptation project ===
Ocean Beach has experienced erosion hot spots for decades. During the winter of 2009-10, storms led to $5 million for emergency remediation due to erosion. The United States Geological Survey predicts that 25% to 70% of the California coastline will disappear by 2100, if no changes to greenhouse gas emissions are made. The Ocean Beach Climate Change Adaptation Project is "...the first major climate change adaptation project in San Francisco," according to San Francisco Water Power Sewer. It plans to create a buried seawall to protect infrastructure, such as a wastewater treatment plant, pump station, and recycled water facility. The project plans to build a seaside trail and aims to protect the coastal area. The first improvements were made in 2015.

=== Sunset Dunes ===
In March 2025, the Great Highway that runs along the beach became permanently closed to traffic (between Lincoln Boulevard and Sloat Boulevard), following the passing of Proposition K, and 40,000 cubic yards of sand was removed from the north side of the beach to the south side of the beach. This portion of the Great Highway was repurposed as the Sunset Dunes park and officially opened on April 12, 2025. 13,000 people visited the park for its opening day. A skateboarding area was opened in June 2025. In August 2025, it was announced that a family-friendly "Park Zone" would be created on the west side of the park's median while a "Multi-Use Zone" for scooters, e-bikes, and runners would be on the east side. The park plans include murals, lounge spaces, and event seating for live music. The park project is a collaboration between San Francisco Recreation and Park Department, San Francisco Municipal Transportation Agency (MTA), Public Utilities Commission (PUC), and San Francisco Department of Public Works (DPW).

Sunset Dunes has seen both supporters and critics. Supporters have appreciated the focus on municipal improvements and community spaces, as well as the fast development cycle. Critics have voiced concerns over traffic congestion in the neighborhood. In September 2025, Joel Engardio was recalled as a San Francisco district supervisor, in reaction to his support of Sunset Dunes. Some pieces of art in the park have been vandalized. In January 2026, San Francisco Superior Court Judge Jeffrey Ross rejected a lawsuit that aimed to undo Proposition K. Some businesses along the Great Highway have reported increases in sales since the opening of the park, while others have reported minor or negligible changes, as of March 2026.

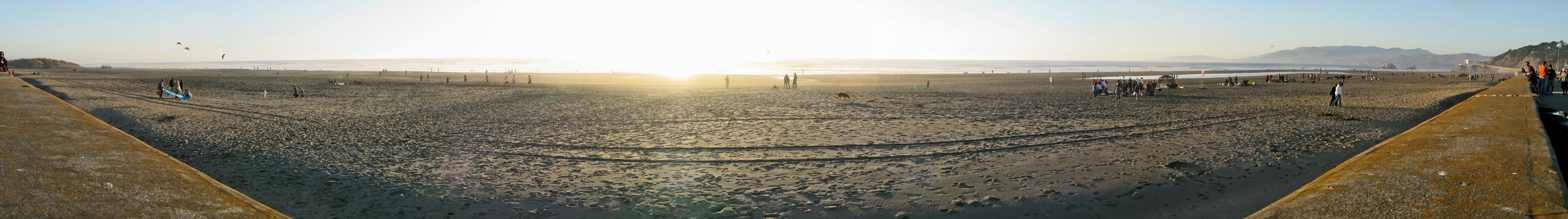
San Francisco Ocean Beach at sunset, October 2007. Photo from northern end of beach.

== See also ==
- 49-Mile Scenic Drive
- List of beaches in California
- List of California state parks
