= Sunset District, San Francisco =

Sunset District
- Neighborhood
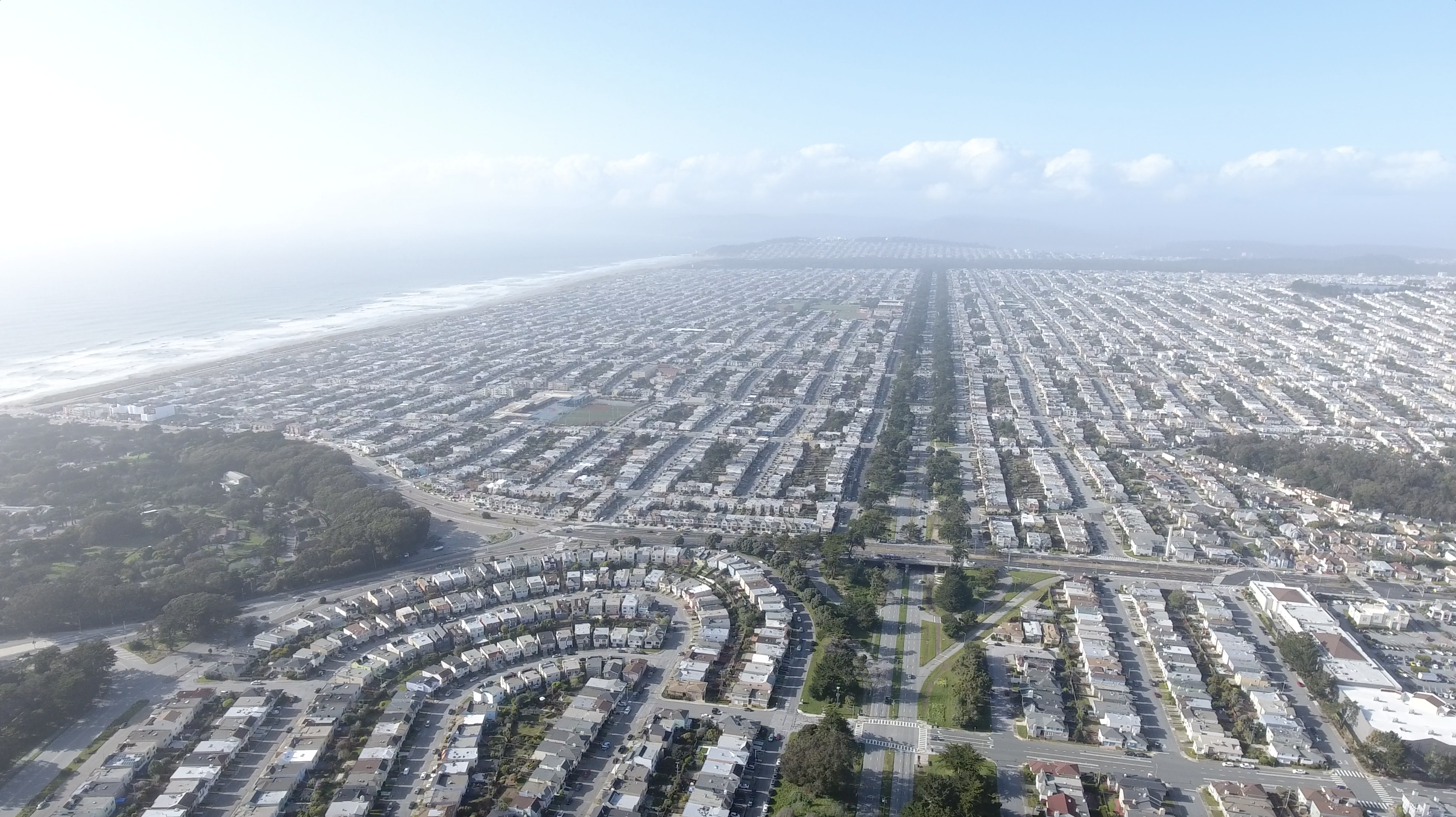
- The Outer Sunset from a drone
- Nicknames: The Sunset, The Avenues
- Location within San Francisco
- Coordinates: 37.758°N 122.486°W
- Country: United States
- State: California
- City-county: San Francisco

Government
  - Supervisor: Alan Wong
  - Assemblymember: Catherine Stefani (D)
  - State senator: Scott Wiener (D)
  - U.S. Rep.: Nancy Pelosi (D)
- Time zone: UTC-8 (PST)
  - Summer (DST): UTC-7 (PDT)
- ZIP codes: 94116, 94122, 94132

The Sunset District is a neighborhood located on the West Side of San Francisco, California, United States. It is the most populous neighborhood in the city.

== Location ==
The Sunset District is the largest neighborhood within the city and county of San Francisco. Golden Gate Park forms the neighborhood's northern border, and the Pacific Ocean (or, more specifically, the long, flat strand of beach known as Ocean Beach) forms its western border. South of the Sunset District is the Parkside neighborhood that is sometimes considered part of the greater Sunset District. Prior to the residential and commercial development of the Sunset District, much of the area was covered by sand dunes and was originally referred to by 19th century San Franciscans as the "Outside Lands."

The Sunset District and the neighboring Richmond District (on the north side of Golden Gate Park) are often collectively known as The Avenues, because the majority of both neighborhoods are spanned by numbered north–south avenues. When the city was originally laid out, the avenues were numbered from 1st to 49th, and the east–west streets were lettered A to X. In 1909, to reduce confusion for mail carriers, the east–west streets and 1st Avenue and 49th Avenue were renamed. The east–west streets were named in ascending alphabetical order in a southward direction after prominent 19th-century American politicians, military leaders, or explorers; 19th-century Mexican landowners; and Spanish conquistadors. 1st Avenue was renamed Arguello Boulevard, and 49th Avenue was renamed La Playa Street (Spanish for "the beach").

Today, the first numbered avenue is 2nd Avenue, starting one block west of Arguello Boulevard, and the last is 48th Avenue near Ocean Beach. The avenue numbers increase incrementally, with one exception: what would be 13th Avenue is known as Funston Avenue, named after Frederick Funston, a U.S. Army general known for his exploits during the Spanish–American War and Philippine–American War, and for directing the U.S. Army response to the 1906 San Francisco earthquake.

The east–west streets in the Sunset appear mostly in alphabetical order. These streets are: Lincoln Way (bordering the south side of Golden Gate Park), Hugo (from Arguello to 7th Avenue only), Irving, Judah, Kirkham, Lawton, Moraga, Noriega, Ortega, Pacheco, Quintara, Rivera, Santiago, Taraval, Ulloa, Vicente, Wawona, Yorba, and Sloat Boulevard. "X" was originally proposed to be Xavier, but was changed to Yorba due to a pronunciation controversy.

== History ==
The origin of the "Sunset" name is not entirely clear. One claim indicates that Aurelius Buckingham, a developer who owned property in the area, coined the term in 1886. Another claim comes from the California Midwinter Exposition, held in Golden Gate Park in 1894 and also known as "The Sunset City."

Before construction of the Twin Peaks Tunnel in 1917, the Sunset was a vast, sparsely inhabited area of large sand dunes and coastal scrub land known as the "Outside Lands." Development was initiated in the 1870s and 1880s with construction of Golden Gate Park, but it did not reach a full scale until after the 1906 San Francisco earthquake, when small lots of tract homes and row homes now characteristic of the neighborhood were built into the sand dunes. These tract homes would displace a smaller original settlement built into the dunes called Carville, which was so named for squatters that lived in abandoned horsecars (horse-drawn trolleys) and cable cars that were dumped in the sand dunes. Development increased by the 1930s, as the Sunset was built and developed into a streetcar suburb. The post–World War II baby boom in the 1950s saw the last of the sand dunes leveled down and replaced with more single – and multifamily homes. In these developments, built mostly by Henry Doelger, entire blocks consist mainly of houses of the same general character, differentiated by variations in their stucco facades and mirrored floorplans, with most built upon 25-foot-wide (7.6 m) lots with no free space between houses. Later, Oliver Rousseau built more individualistic homes in the district.

Historically, the Sunset has been an Irish and Italian ethnic enclave. Beginning in the late 1960s the neighborhood saw a steady influx of Asian (mostly Chinese) immigrants following the Immigration and Nationality Act of 1965 which lifted racial quotas allowing for more nationals of countries outside Western and Northern Europe to immigrate to the United States. Additionally, the Handover of Hong Kong motivated many Chinese to immigrate to the U.S. due to the political and economic uncertainties. In 1999, around 60% of the homeowners in the Sunset and Richmond districts were Chinese.

In November 2024, the measure Proposition K passed to close two miles of the Great Highway to open an oceanfront park.

== Sub-neighborhoods ==
=== Inner Sunset ===
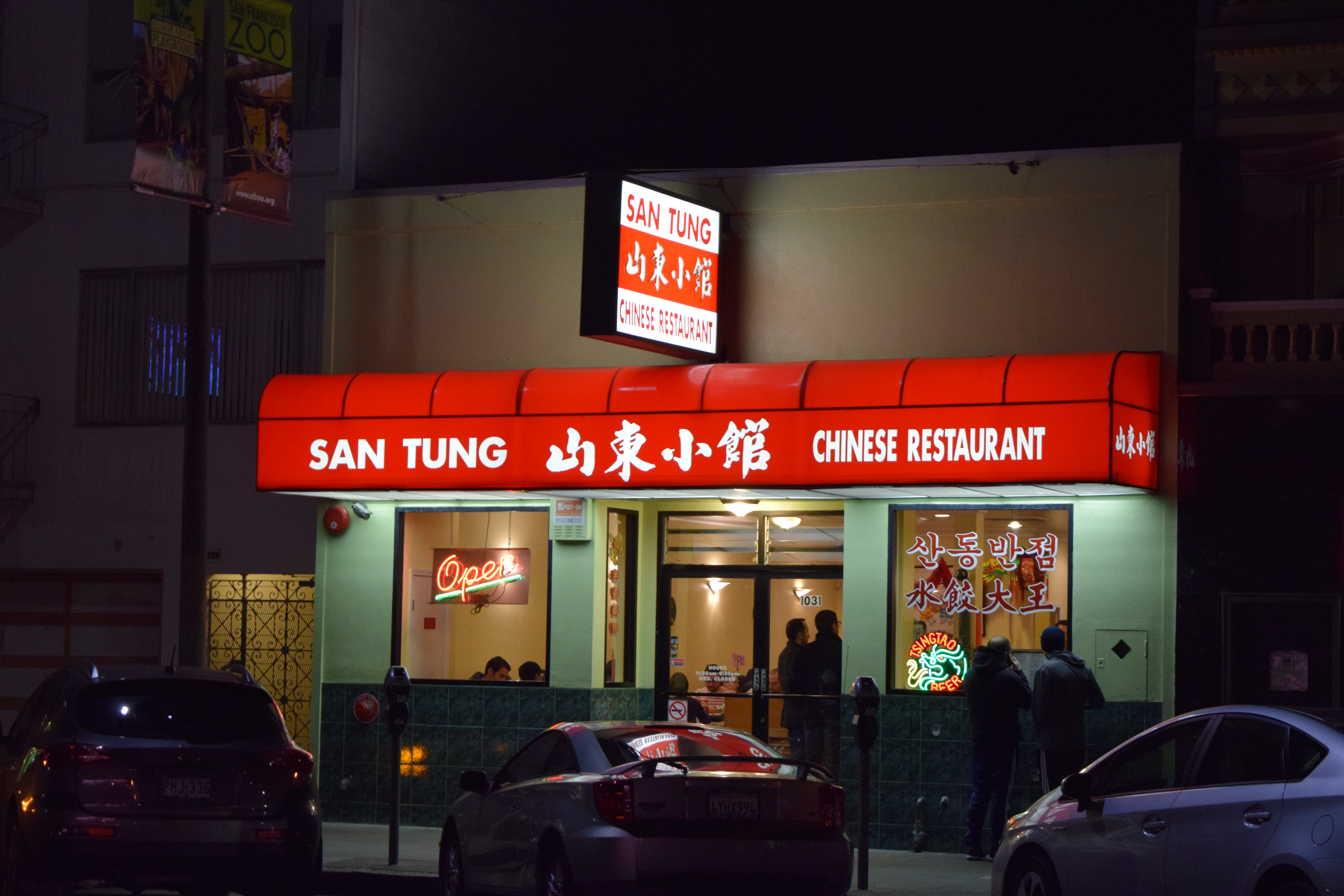
San Tung Chinese Restaurant, a popular lunch and dinner spot on Irving Street between 11th and 12th Avenues

The Inner Sunset is bordered by Lincoln Way to the north, 2nd Ave to the east, Quintara Street to the south, and 19th Avenue to the west. This far-east section of the Sunset is located just west of Mount Sutro. The main commercial area is along Irving Street from 5th Avenue to 12th Avenue, and along 9th Avenue from Lincoln Way to Judah Street, much of which is dotted with a variety of restaurants and shops.

The Inner Sunset hosts a variety of local businesses, including restaurants, bars, breweries, book stores, bakeries, coffee shops, ice cream parlors, clothes and shoe stores, a tattoo parlor, and a wine bar. Many of these establishments are clustered around the intersection of 9th Avenue and Irving Street. Food offered by the restaurants located in the Inner Sunset includes pizza, Mexican, Thai, Persian, Korean, Malaysian, Hawaiian, Greek, Ethiopian, Pakistani, Cajun/Creole, Dim Sum, Turkish, Peruvian, Chinese, Vietnamese, California Cuisine, Mediterranean, Indian, Japanese, Vegetarian.

The Inner Sunset is the 12th wealthiest neighborhood in San Francisco with a median income of $112,050. The median sale price of homes in the Sunset District is $1.5M.

=== Central Sunset ===
The Central Sunset is bounded by Lincoln Way to the north, 19th Avenue to the east, Ortega Street to the south, and Sunset Boulevard to the west. This area is mostly residential with cookie-cutter homes, large lots, and a commercial strip along Irving Street from 19th Avenue to 27th Avenue and on Noriega Street from 19th Avenue to 27th Avenue and 30th Avenue to 33rd Avenue. Features of the area include the Sunset Reservoir (which takes up eight square blocks between Ortega and Quintara streets and 24th and 28th avenues), which has a small park surrounding its outer rim; Golden Gate Park; and the Sunset Recreation Center. The Central Sunset is often considered part of the Outer Sunset, including by the Mayor's Office of Neighborhood Services.

=== Outer Sunset ===
The Outer Sunset is bordered by Lincoln Way to the north, Sunset Boulevard (between 36th and 37th avenues) to the east, Sloat Boulevard to the south, and Ocean Beach to the west. The primary commercial avenues are Judah, Noriega, and Taraval. The Outer Sunset is the foggiest section in San Francisco due to its close proximity to Ocean Beach. The area's main attractions include the San Francisco Zoo, Golden Gate Park, Ocean Beach, and Lake Merced.

== Climate ==
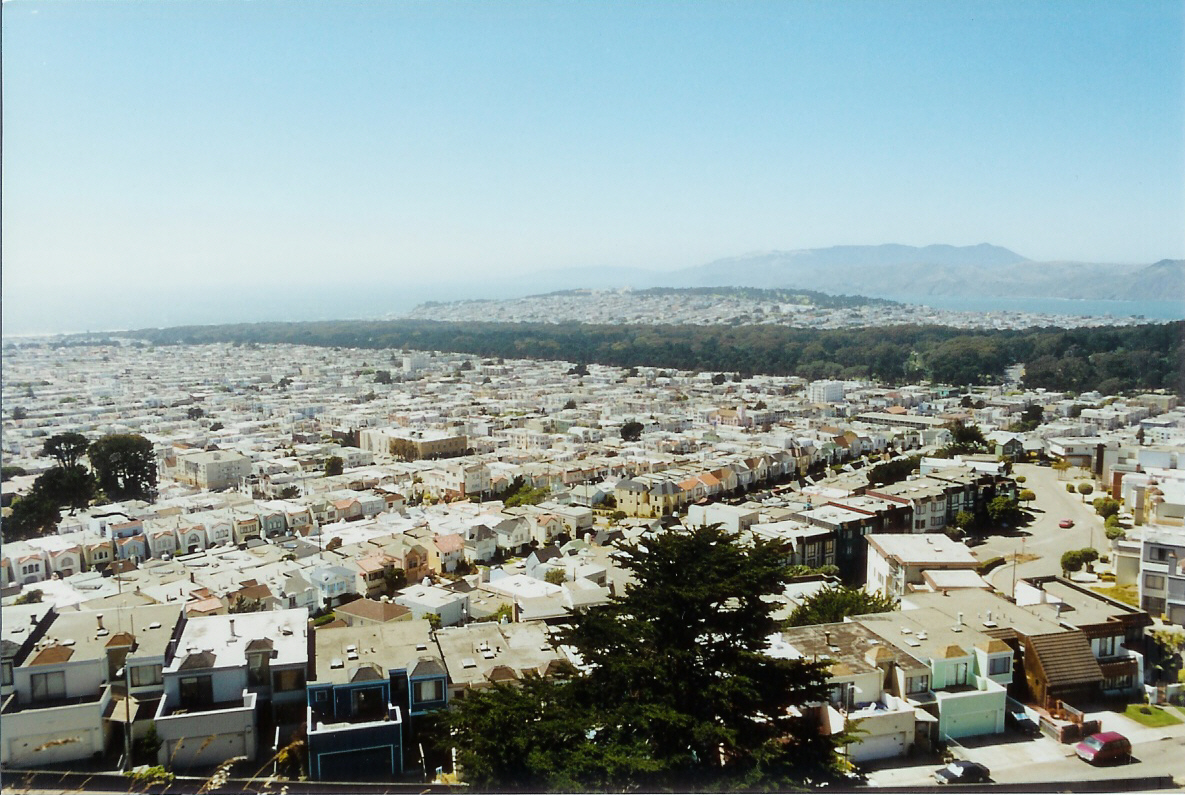
View of the "Inner Sunset District" facing Golden Gate Park

The western part of the Sunset borders the cold northern California Pacific Ocean coastline, due to this it tends to get much of the fog San Francisco is famous for. The Sunset can be foggy and chilly for some days during summer. The Sunset's finest weather is usually from August through December, when regional air patterns transition from onshore to offshore weather and the area is free of fog. Sand carried by Pacific Ocean winds can be found on roadways and driveways within the first five to ten blocks east of Ocean Beach.

Like much of the coast of Northern California, the Sunset district has a cool summer Mediterranean-type climate, albeit with an unusual annual temperature distribution. The warmest days of the year occur in October and then the coldest nights of the year occur just two months later in December. Its climate is strongly influenced by the Pacific Ocean and therefore has even cooler summers and milder winters than downtown San Francisco. Rainfall follows a seasonal pattern with plentiful precipitation in the winter (almost all of this falling as rain) and extremely dry albeit foggy summers.

Climate data for San Francisco Oceanside, California, 1991–2020 normals, extremes 1958–2021
Month	Jan	Feb	Mar	Apr	May	Jun	Jul	Aug	Sep	Oct	Nov	Dec	Year
Record high °F (°C)	79 (26)	77 (25)	81 (27)	85 (29)	82 (28)	82 (28)	85 (29)	89 (32)	96 (36)	99 (37)	90 (32)	73 (23)	99 (37)
Mean maximum °F (°C)	66.4 (19.1)	69.0 (20.6)	71.0 (21.7)	71.6 (22.0)	67.3 (19.6)	66.1 (18.9)	65.8 (18.8)	69.6 (20.9)	77.3 (25.2)	83.9 (28.8)	75.2 (24.0)	65.4 (18.6)	86.3 (30.2)
Mean daily maximum °F (°C)	59.0 (15.0)	60.4 (15.8)	60.8 (16.0)	60.4 (15.8)	59.8 (15.4)	60.9 (16.1)	61.8 (16.6)	63.7 (17.6)	65.0 (18.3)	66.4 (19.1)	63.5 (17.5)	59.1 (15.1)	61.7 (16.5)
Daily mean °F (°C)	52.4 (11.3)	53.5 (11.9)	54.4 (12.4)	54.8 (12.7)	55.4 (13.0)	56.8 (13.8)	58.1 (14.5)	59.5 (15.3)	60.1 (15.6)	59.8 (15.4)	56.5 (13.6)	52.5 (11.4)	56.2 (13.4)
Mean daily minimum °F (°C)	45.7 (7.6)	46.6 (8.1)	47.9 (8.8)	49.1 (9.5)	51.0 (10.6)	52.7 (11.5)	54.3 (12.4)	55.4 (13.0)	55.3 (12.9)	53.2 (11.8)	49.5 (9.7)	45.8 (7.7)	50.5 (10.3)
Mean minimum °F (°C)	37.8 (3.2)	39.7 (4.3)	40.7 (4.8)	42.4 (5.8)	44.8 (7.1)	46.9 (8.3)	50.4 (10.2)	50.0 (10.0)	49.6 (9.8)	46.1 (7.8)	41.7 (5.4)	36.5 (2.5)	34.0 (1.1)
Record low °F (°C)	29 (−2)	29 (−2)	26 (−3)	27 (−3)	35 (2)	35 (2)	40 (4)	40 (4)	38 (3)	35 (2)	26 (−3)	23 (−5)	23 (−5)
Average precipitation inches (mm)	3.94 (100)	4.01 (102)	2.98 (76)	1.37 (35)	0.64 (16)	0.19 (4.8)	0.01 (0.25)	0.05 (1.3)	0.11 (2.8)	0.90 (23)	2.22 (56)	4.22 (107)	20.64 (524)
Average precipitation days	10.6	10.7	10.0	6.1	3.5	1.2	0.2	0.5	0.9	3.0	6.9	12.2	65.8
Source: NOAA

== Attractions ==
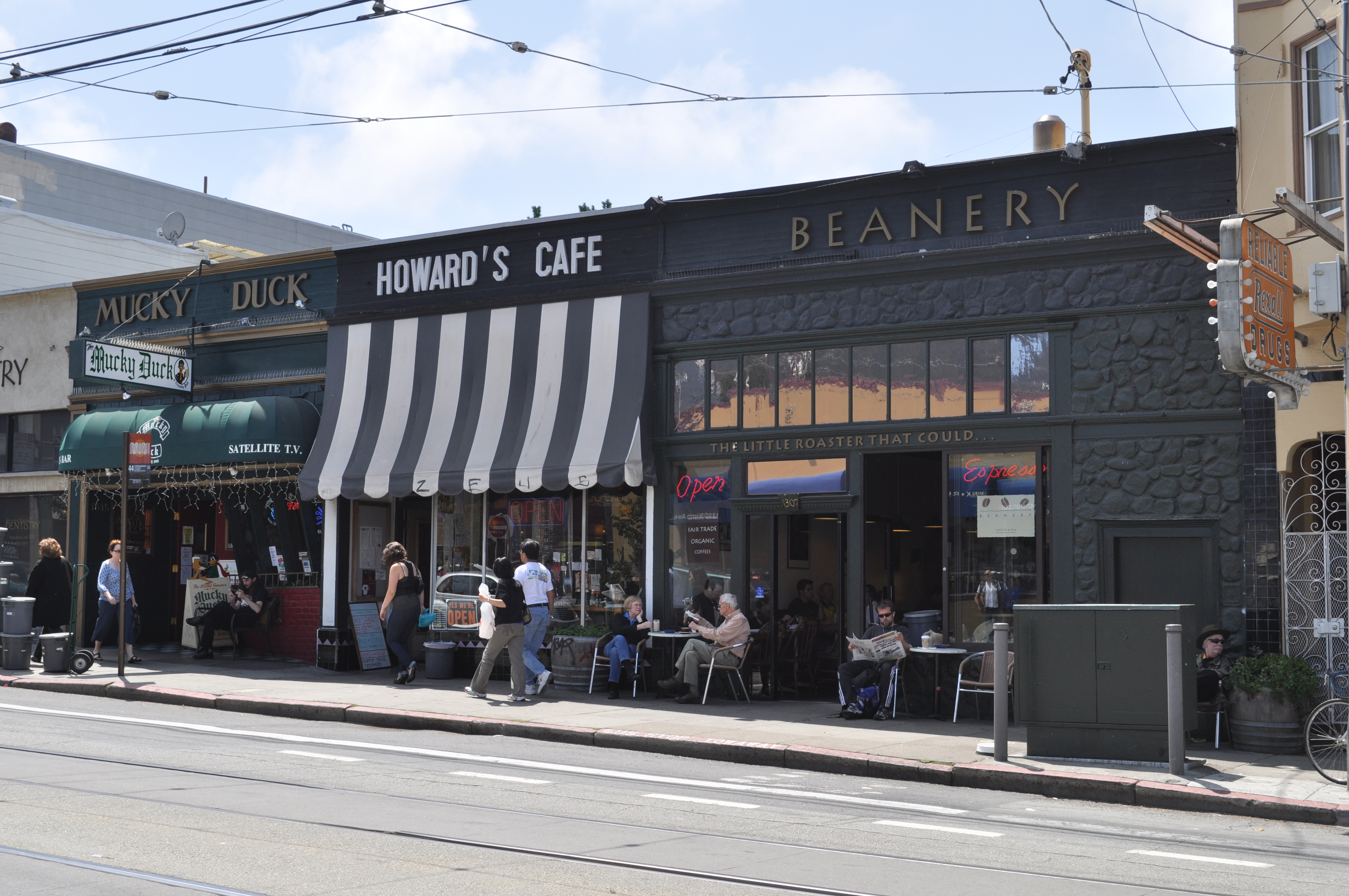
The commercial area on 9th Avenue and Irving Street has become a lively nightlife spot.

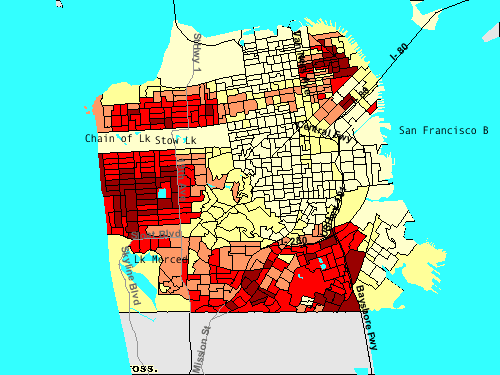
Sunset District has a large Asian American population (darker colors represent a larger proportion of Asian-Americans),

The Sunset District contains several large park and recreation areas. The San Francisco Zoo is located in the southwestern corner of the neighborhood by Lake Merced, the largest lake within San Francisco. Also within the Lake Merced area are several golf courses: the private Olympic Club and San Francisco Golf Club, and the public TPC Harding Park. Across from Lake Merced is Fort Funston, an old coastal battery, now part of the Golden Gate National Recreation Area. Fort Funston notably has some of the last remnants of the sand dune ecosystem that once covered the entire Sunset District.

Stern Grove, a heavily wooded valley park with an amphitheater, located on Sloat Boulevard between 19th and 34th avenues, is known for its annual summer Stern Grove Festival.

Three parks lie on the far east border of the district: the northernmost is Grand View Park (also referred to as Turtle Hill) a small, elevated park surrounded by 14th and 15th Avenues, as well as Noriega Street; moving south, next is Golden Gate Heights Park, just east of 14th Avenue north of Quintara; and Hawk Hill Park, also east of 14th Avenue at Santiago. These natural areas belong to a remnant ridge-top system and include some of the last-remaining sand-dune communities in the city.

An Inner Sunset Farmers' Market is held Sunday morning, year-round, located in the parking lot at 1315 8th Avenue, off of Irving Street, spanning between 8th and 9th Avenues, operated by the Pacific Coast Farmers' Market Association, sponsored by the Inner Sunset Park Neighbors, and offers California-grown produce, fish, eggs, and meat, as well as local food vendors and artisans.

An Outer Sunset Farmers' Market is held Sunday morning, year-round, located on 37th Avenue between Ortega Street and Pacheco Street, east of St. Ignatius College Preparatory and west of the Sunset Boulevard parkway.

== Education ==
The San Francisco Unified School District operates public K–12 schools.

Educational institutions include the Parnassus campus and medical center of the University of California, San Francisco, located in Inner Sunset; the main campus of San Francisco State University, located in the southwestern corner of the neighborhood across from Lake Merced; Abraham Lincoln High School, located in the center of the Sunset District; St. Ignatius College Preparatory (a private, coeducational school educating men and women for others in the Jesuit tradition in San Francisco since 1855; one of the oldest, most prestigious, high achieving, top performing secondary schools in the state of California) located since 1969 adjacent to Sunset Boulevard; and Lowell High School, the oldest public high school west of the Mississippi.

== Places of worship ==
One of the few Assyrian American churches in the Bay Area, and the only one in San Francisco, The Assyrian Church of the East (which also doubles as a day-care center) is located off Lawton Street and 46th Ave. San Francisco has nearly 500 Assyrian-American residents, although the count is often lower than what the U.S. Census usually reports as many chose terms such as "Iraqi American," "Syrian American", "Iranian American", or just simply "Middle Eastern American".

== Beach culture ==
The strip near the Pacific Ocean has a notable population of surfers who take advantage of the surf conditions of Ocean Beach. Because of the cold Pacific current that brings ocean water from Alaska, it is usually necessary to wear a wetsuit when surfing at Ocean Beach. Several surf shops can be found near the beach in the Outer Sunset.

Several playgrounds are located in the Sunset, including Sunset Playground and Recreation Center, Blue Boat Playground, West Sunset, McCoppin Square, and South Sunset.
