= San Francisco and San Mateo Electric Railway =

First electric street car company in San Francisco, CA

San Francisco & San Mateo Electric Railway
Overview
- Headquarters: San Francisco
- Locale: California
- Dates of operation: 1892–1902
- Successor: United Railroads of San Francisco

Technical
- Track gauge: 4 ft 8 1/2 in (1,435 mm) standard gauge
- Electrification: 550 V DC
- Length: 21 miles (34 km)

The San Francisco and San Mateo Electric Railway (SF&SM) was the first electric streetcar company in San Francisco, California. The company was only in business for ten years, starting from 1892 until it was merged into the United Railroads of San Francisco (URR) in 1902.

== Initial founding ==
Brothers Isaac (Behrend) and Fabian Joost were real-estate developers in the neighborhood of Sunnyside. They saw the success of Frank Julian Sprague's Richmond Union Passenger Railway in Richmond, Virginia, and determined that an electric streetcar system running through their then-isolated portion of the city would be a good way to boost property values. In 1890, the San Francisco and San Mateo Railway Company was incorporated. On July 29, 1891, the railroad held a silver spike ceremony at Ocean View at the border between the two counties; Behrend Joost, president of the railroad, physically drove the final spike symbolically joining the rail segments. At the time, poles for the overhead lines extended as far as Holy Cross Cemetery. The railway opened for business on April 26, 1892.

A double-track railway ran from the Ferry Building at the foot of Market Street, over Steuart Street, Harrison Street, Bryant Street, Fourteenth Street, and Guerrero Street, with single track extending down San Jose Avenue to the Baden area of South San Francisco, with a transfer required at 30th Street and San Jose Avenue. The line did not actually extend to the city of San Mateo, which lies 13 miles (20.9 km) further to the south, although it did run through part of the County of San Mateo.

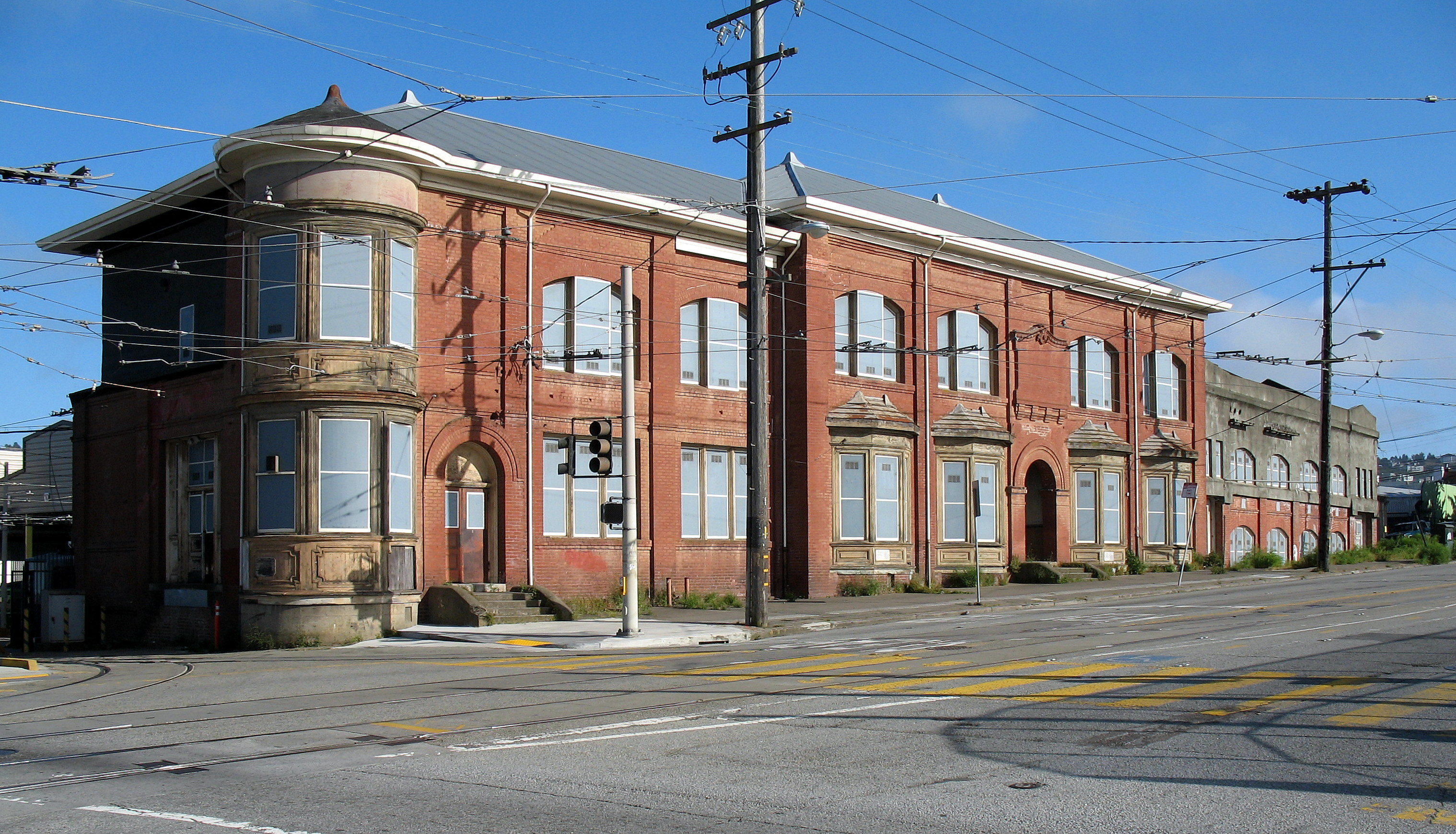
The Geneva Office Building and Power House, built in 1901 for the San Francisco and San Mateo Electric Railway

A powerhouse and car barn were built on Sunnyside Avenue one block off San Jose Avenue. The streetcars were of the California car design, with an enclosed center section and open center bench seating at either end of the car, similar to the cable cars used on the California Street line. Single-truck (four wheel) cars 26 feet (7.9 m) long were used on the double track line, and 28-foot (8.5 m) two-truck cars were used on San Jose Avenue.

The route chosen by the company was rather unfortunate. They were not able to traverse any of the major streets, as rival streetcar companies already had lines on them. Furthermore, beyond 30th Street, the area of the city was not yet fully settled. With an unpopular route that led to sparsely populated neighborhoods, the company could not generate much revenue despite having nearly 4,200,000 riders annually. This trend continued after the merger into URR well into the 1920s, when electric streetcars were at their most profitable.

The line also gained a reputation for being dangerous. Although the company had built a counterweight system to slow cars on a Harrison Street hill between 2nd and 3rd, no such system was added to another hill on Chenery Street, which became the site of a number of runaway cars. Even an injury to a boy there on opening day did not spur the company to action. After a few such accidents, the company finally relaid the track and purchased cars with better brakes. The counterweight was removed in 1893.

By late 1892, the company opened a second line from the Mission District to Douglass Street via 18th Street, hoping to cash in on the Golden Gate Park traffic (the intersection of Douglass and 18th, however, is about 0.8 miles (1.3 km) southeast of the park). They were able to extend this to within five city blocks of the park, but could go no further because the Market Street Railway Company had their line on Frederick Street, which denied the SF&SM any further access.

The company did find one new source of revenue, however. The SF&SM served Holy Cross, Lawn, Mt. Olivet, Cypress, and Woodlawn cemeteries, all in Colma (via the cemeteries' own tracks). As a result, funeral traffic became a consistent source of income. Special funeral trains were run consisting of a short mail, express, and funeral car carrying the casket, followed by one or more conventional passenger cars carrying mourners. A September 18, 1893 newspaper article describing the first use of the car notes a charge of $10 to carry the casket, with the regular fare of 10 cents for each mourner.

Unfortunately, this was not enough to cover the debt incurred from the line's initial construction as well as subsequent interest payments, forcing the company into receivership. The receiver subsequently was granted permission by the Market Street Railway to use a portion of their line and the SF&SM 18th & Park line finally opened in November 1894 (this eventually was converted to San Francisco's first trolleybus service in 1935). New cars, the first in the city to have front windows, also arrived in summer of 1894, making it finally possible to go from the Ferry Building to Baden without a transfer.

== Sale to new owners ==
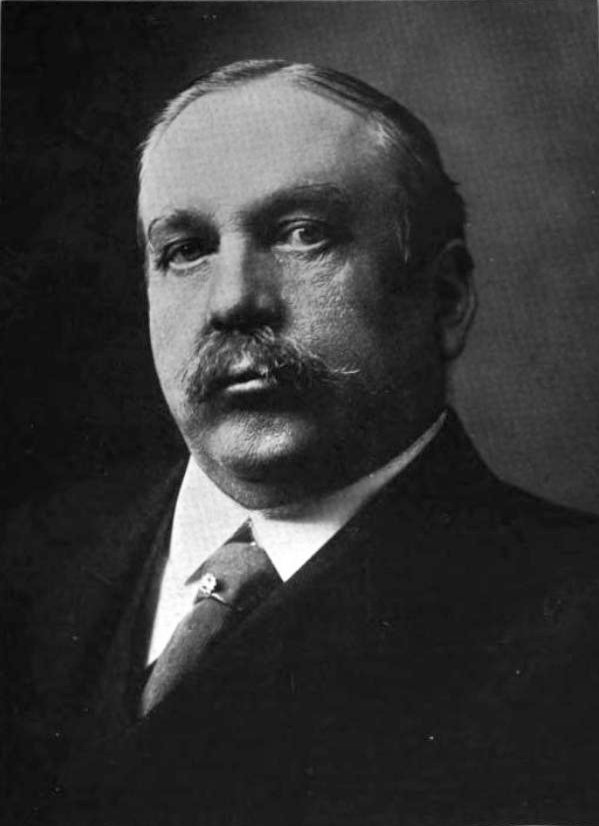
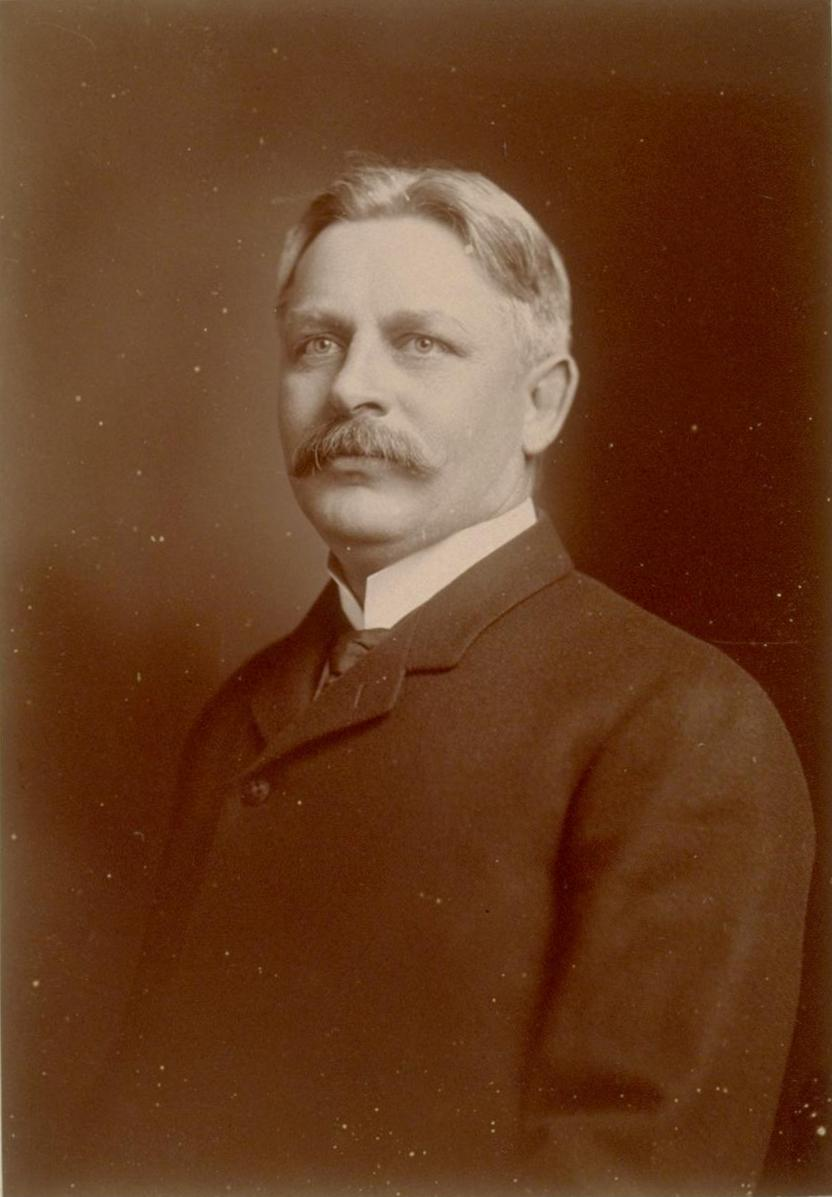
Adolph (left) and John D. Spreckels

Still, the receiver was unable to generate much of a profit and on April 11, 1896, the company was sold to a group of prominent San Franciscans, headed by brothers Adolph and John D. Spreckels. The investors paid off the debts and renamed the company to the San Francisco and San Mateo Electric Railway. The new ownership replaced the original 50-pound rail in San Francisco with 85-pound rail in 1897; and the San Jose Avenue line was relaid with 60-pound rail in 1899. The line 18th Street spur was completed to Golden Gate Park by 1898. The original fleet of thirty motor cars and three trailers was increased by purchase of forty more motor cars in 1898 and ten more in 1900 plus twenty larger motor cars. One of these cars from 1898, Car 0304, was still in service on the San Francisco Muni as late as 2000 (it has since been retired).

== United Railroads of San Francisco ==
In 1901, the company was sold once more to the "Baltimore Syndicate", a group of East Coast investors looking to purchase a number of Bay Area railways; their stated intent was to build the line as far south as San Jose, and they promised to build to the city of San Mateo within a year. In 1902, these companies all merged to form the United Railroads of San Francisco (URR). The URR then quickly built out the line 10.635 miles (17.115 km) to San Mateo which was operational on December 31, 1902. The extension was largely adjacent to the Southern Pacific Railroad mainline. Nineteen new motor cars, numbered 1225 to 1244 went into service on the new line on September 7, 1903.

As URR struggled to rebuild after the 1906 San Francisco earthquake, a shortage of motor cars resulted from conversion of former cable car lines to electric power. The Philadelphia and Western Railroad had ordered twelve 52-foot (16 m) motor cars from the Saint Louis Car Company; but these cars were sold to URR when the original purchaser couldn't pay for them. These 300-horsepower (220 kW) cars were promptly put into service on the San Mateo line where they became known as the Big Subs. Their size became a problem as the streets they used became congested with automobiles, and they required too much power on hills. The Big Subs were retired in 1923; and the cars built in 1903 were modernized with electric heaters and deeply cushioned leather seats to continue service until this route was abandoned.

In 1908, the Southern Pacific Railroad purchased the Santa Clara Interurban Railway Company, which had built an electric railway system in Palo Alto and owned a right-of-way between the cities of San Mateo and Santa Clara. The SP announced they would build out the remainder of the right-of-way first as an electric passenger railroad, then extend it to San Francisco via the Ocean View Branch (which was lightly used after the 1907 completion of the Bayshore Cutoff) competing with the SF&SM Electric Railway. SP formed the Peninsular Railway Company in 1909, merging the former Santa Clara Interurban with the Peninsular Railroad and San Jose & Los Gatos Interurban Railway, but the line was never extended north of Palo Alto into San Mateo County.

== The 40 line ==
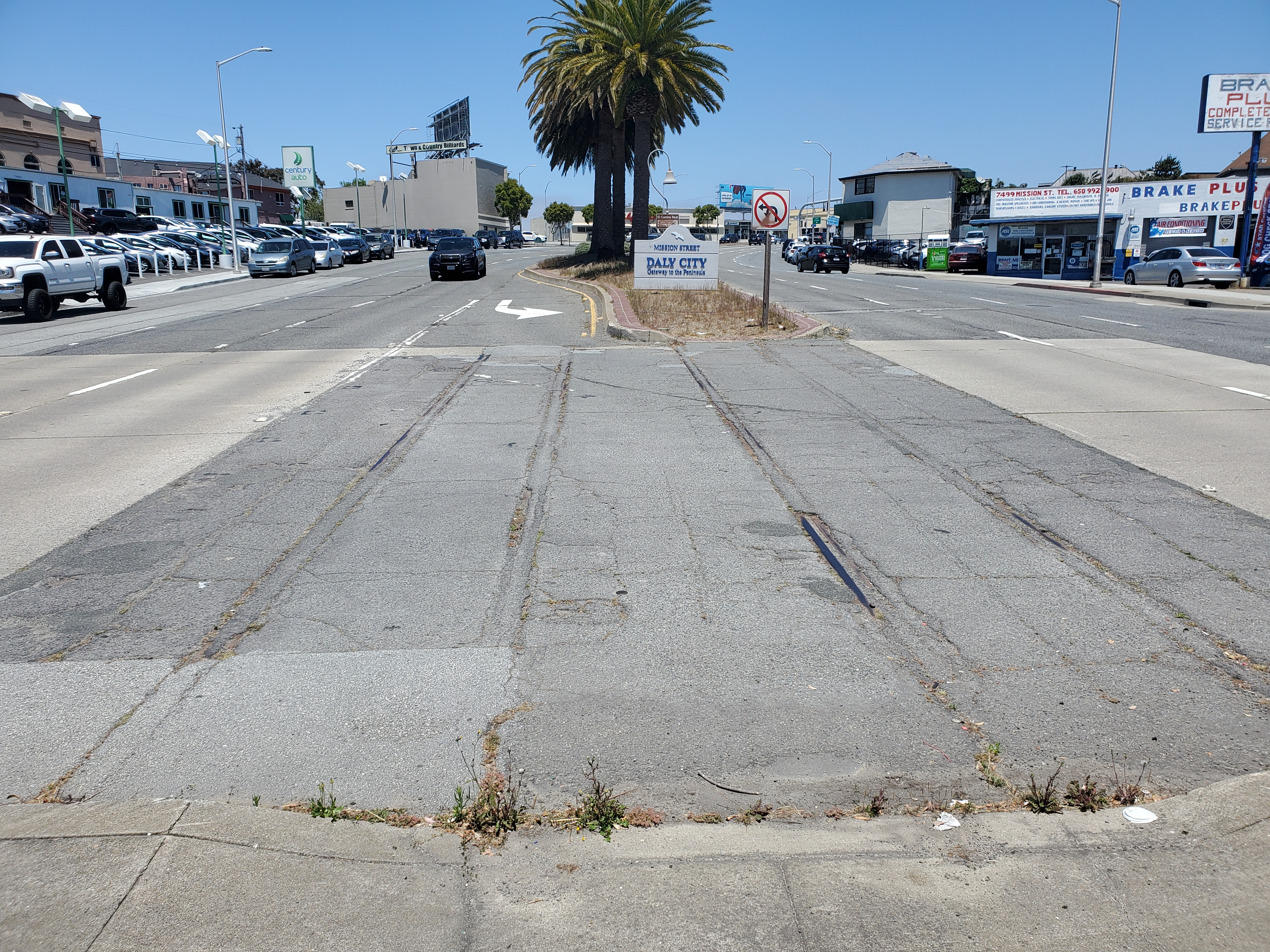
Abandoned tracks in El Camino Real in Daly City, seen in 2023

URR rebuilt from the 1906 San Francisco earthquake with more efficient routing along major streets replacing formerly parallel lines of the consolidated competing companies. Cars on the San Mateo extension and former San Francisco & San Mateo line through Baden, Colma, and Daly City were routed along Mission Street through San Francisco in what became known as the No. 40 line. The 40 line became one of the URR's most profitable routes, and remained in service until January 16, 1949. Funeral service remained an important source of revenue, and three longer cars were repainted with appropriately somber colors and interior decor for exclusive use in funeral service after rebuilding with a baggage door near one end for loading and unloading coffins.

== See also ==
- Market Street Railway
- SamTrans
- San Francisco Municipal Railway
