= Market Street Railway (transit operator) =

California transit operator

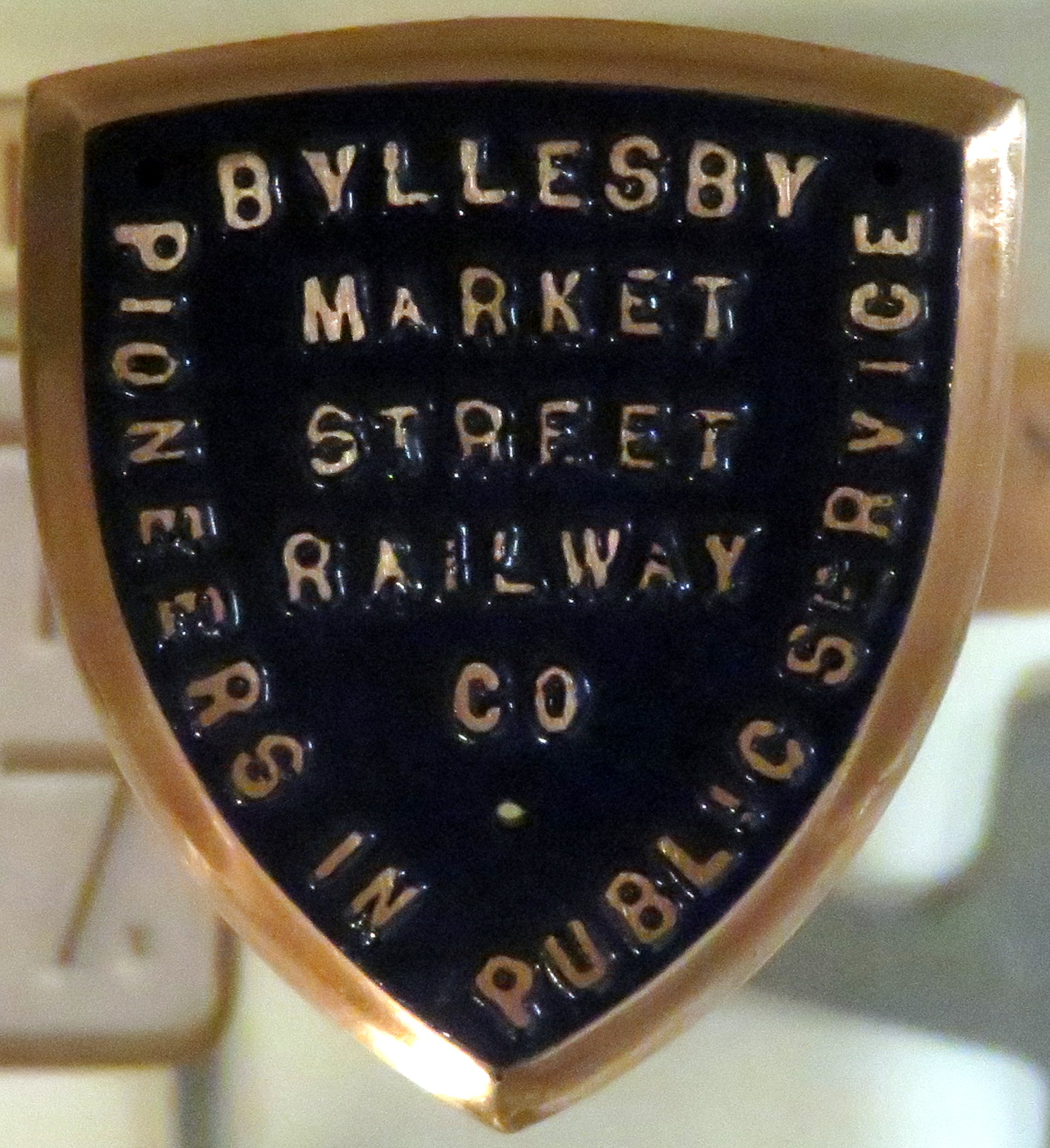
- Market Street Railway brass logo.

Overview
- Locale: San Francisco, California
- Dates of operation: 1857–1944
- Successor: San Francisco Municipal Railway

Technical
- Length: 284 miles (457 km) (in 1929)

The Market Street Railway Company was a commercial streetcar and bus operator in San Francisco. The company was named after the famous Market Street of that city, which formed the core of its transportation network. Over the years, the company was also known as the Market Street Railroad Company, the Market Street Cable Railway Company and the United Railroads of San Francisco. Once the largest transit operator in the city, the company folded in 1944 and its assets and services were acquired by the city-owned San Francisco Municipal Railway. Many of the former routes continue to exist into the 2020s, but served by buses.

The company should not be mistaken for the current Market Street Railway, which is named after its predecessor but is actually a legally unconnected non-profit support group for San Francisco's heritage streetcar lines.

== History ==
=== Steam and horses ===
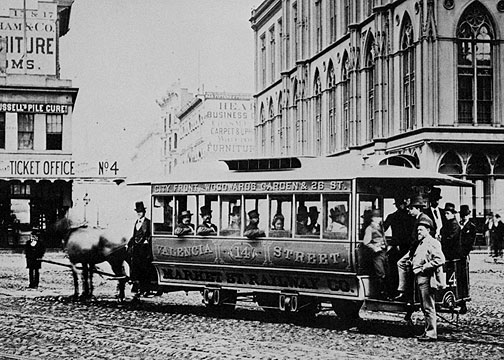
Horsecar at Market & Post, c. 1865

The franchise for what would become the Market Street Railway was granted in 1857 to Thomas Hayes. The line was the first railway to open in San Francisco, commencing service on July 4, 1860 as the Market Street Railroad Company. The initial line ran down Market and Valencia as far as Center Street (later 16th Street). Traction was provided by steam power as steam dummy locomotives pulling a trailer car. Four Portland gauge tank locomotives were built by San Francisco's Albion Foundry. Locomotives #1 and #4 were 24 feet (7.3 m) long with engine, baggage and passenger compartments driven by the front wheel only 0-2-2T. Locomotives #2 and #3 were 18-foot (5.5 m) 0-4-0Ts with a baggage compartment. Both types pulled 40-foot (12 m) double-truck trailers with seating for 64 passengers. Baldwin Locomotive Works built two 0-4-0T steam dummies (C/N 5004 & 5009) in 1880 to operate over the standard-gauge railway extension from Valencia Street to Castro Street until 1888.

Horses began to replace steam as traction in 1867. In 1895 the company placed a newspaper advertisement in The San Francisco Examiner offering horse cars for $20 ($10 without seats). Many of these became the basis for the impromptu community built from streetcars called Carville-by-the-Sea.

=== Cable ===
Market Street Cable Railway Co.

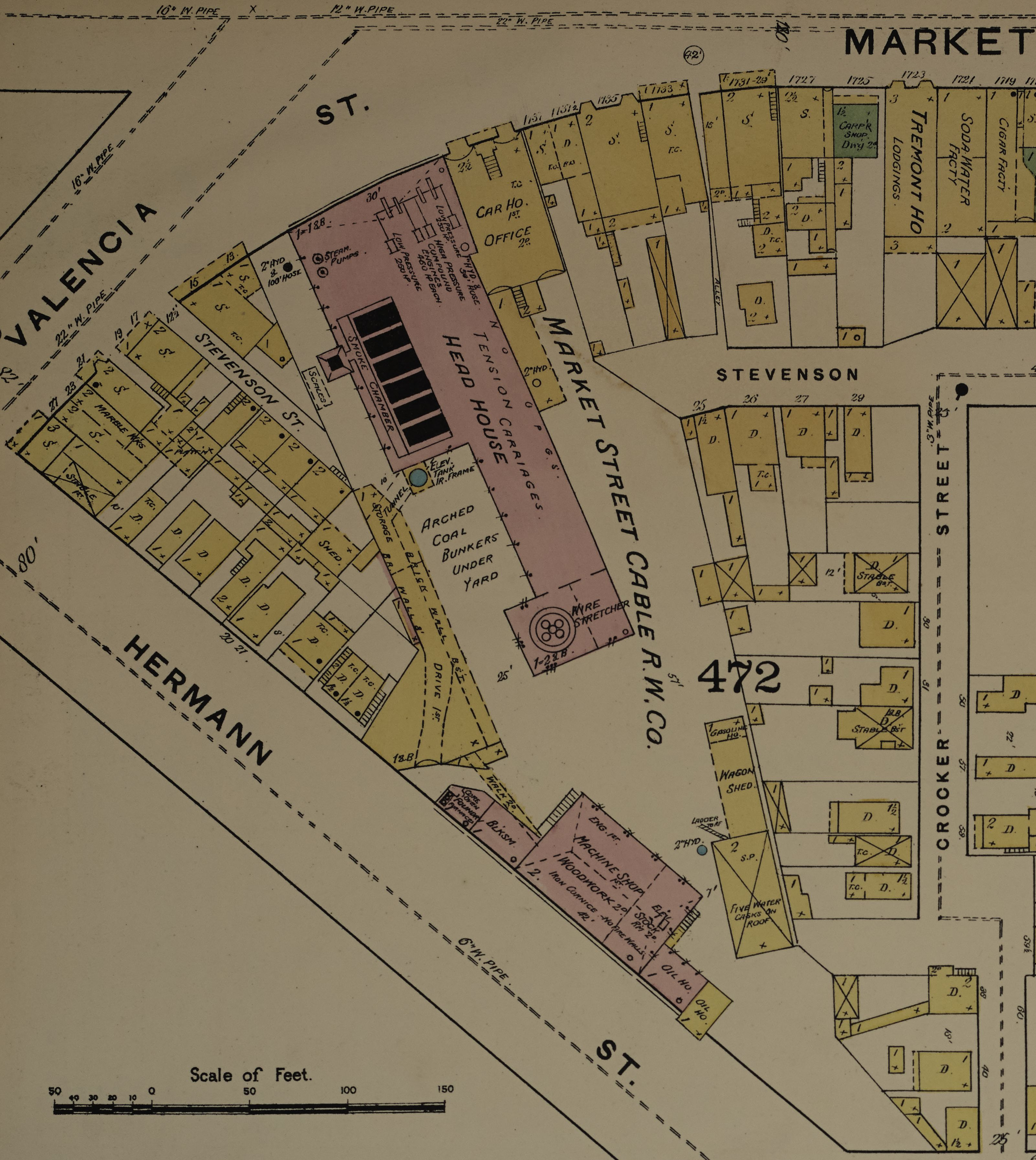
Powerhouse at Market and Valencia in 1889 Sanborn map

Routemap of all cable hauled railroads in San Francisco

Following the opening of the cable hauled Clay Street Hill Railroad in 1873, pressure grew to convert the city's horsecar lines to the new form of traction. In 1882, Leland Stanford and associates bought the Market Street Railroad Company and converted its lines to cable haulage. In the process, the company's name was changed to the Market Street Cable Railway Company (MSCRy). This company was to grow to become San Francisco's largest cable car operator. At its peak, it operated five lines all of which converged into Market Street to a common terminus at the Ferry Building; during rush hours a cable car left that terminus every 15 seconds. The main line, which began operation from the Ferry Building down Market to Valencia and Twenty-Ninth in August 1883, was joined by four lines that branched off Market by the end of 1888: McAllister, Hayes, Haight, and Castro.

=== Electric and United Railroads ===
Market Street Railway bonds and stocks

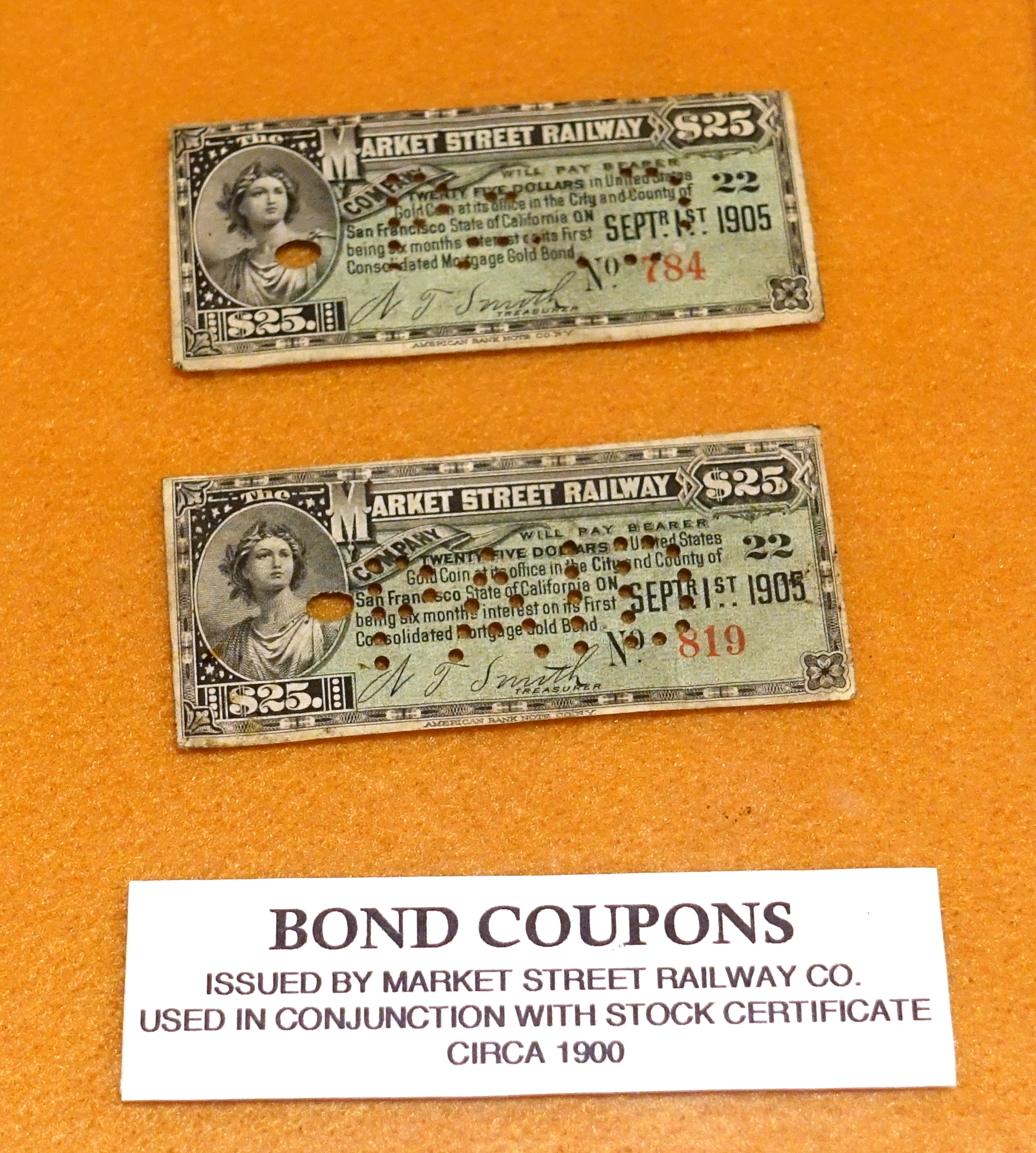
Bond coupons c. 1900

Stock certificate c. 1920

However transit technology was still moving on, and the new electric streetcar quickly proved to be cheaper to build and operate than the cable car, and capable of climbing all but San Francisco's steepest hills. In 1893, Stanford died and the company was taken over by the Southern Pacific Railroad. The company was again renamed to the Market Street Railway Company, and began converting its lines to electric traction. In 1895, MSRy inaugurated service on the Fillmore Counterbalance, which was the steepest rail line to date, operating as a hybrid of counterbalance funicular and electric traction.

In 1902, the Southern Pacific Railroad sold their San Francisco railways to a group of eastern investors: Patrick Calhoun's Baltimore Syndicate. It consolidated them with other San Francisco lines into a new company called the United Railroads of San Francisco (URR).

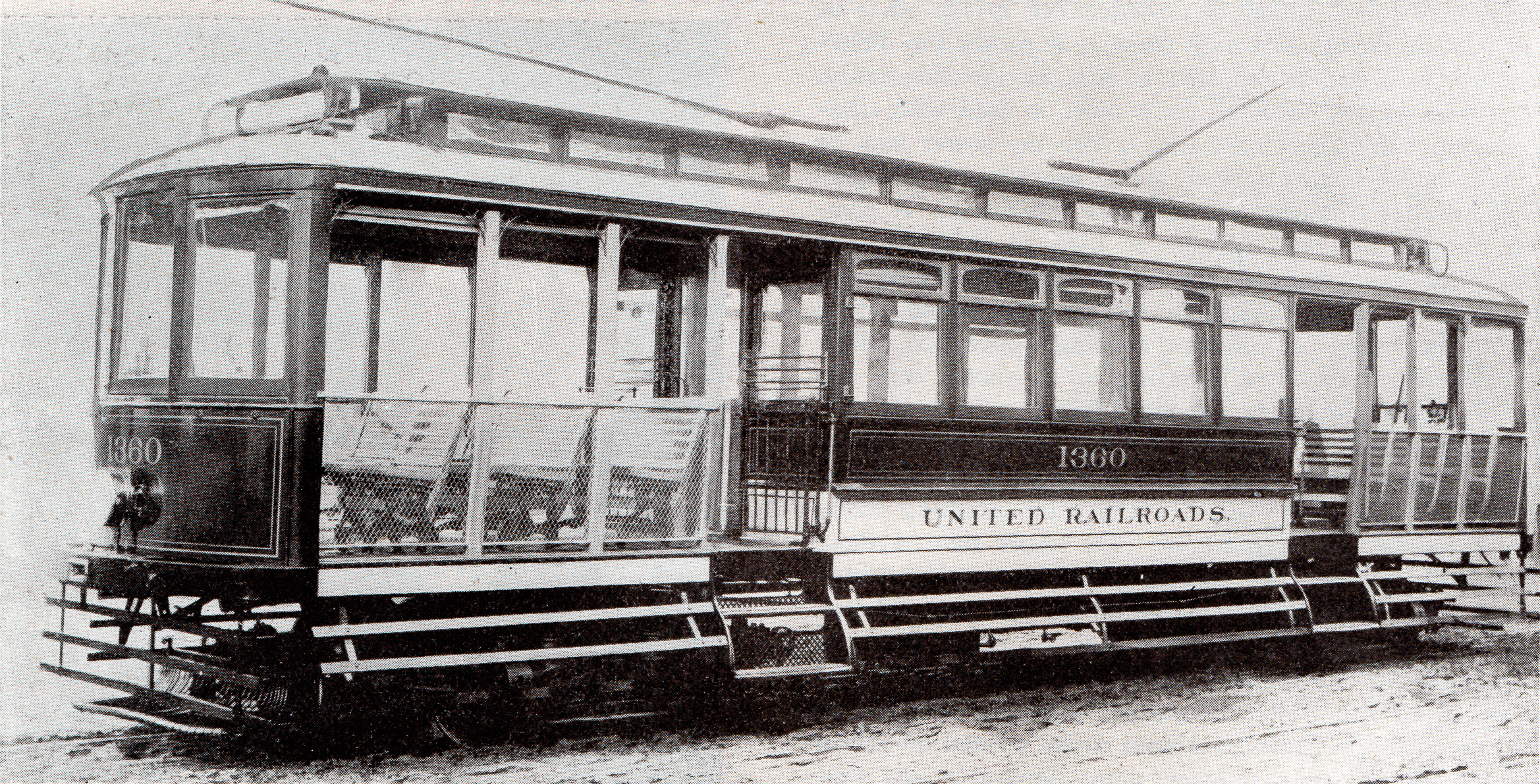
A United Railroads of San Francisco standard car c. 1905

Conversion to electricity was resisted by opponents like Rudolph Spreckels and other property owners who objected to what they saw as ugly overhead lines on the major thoroughfares of the city center. At 5:12 am on April 18, 1906, those objections were swept away as the great San Francisco earthquake struck. The race to rebuild the city allowed the company to replace all but the steepest of its cable car lines with electric streetcar lines.

On May 14, 1906, Supervisors permitted United Railroads to string overhead trolley wires on Market Street. The next day the Examiner accused United Railroads of exploiting the disaster to push through its overhead trolley franchise but they proceeded to install overhead power on all of its lines. The San Francisco graft trials were a series of attempts from 1905 to 1908 to prosecute both government officials accused of receiving bribes. These included members of the San Francisco Board of Supervisors, San Francisco Mayor Eugene Schmitz, attorneys Abe Ruef and Tirey L. Ford, and the business owners who were paying the bribes.

=== Consolidation and decline ===
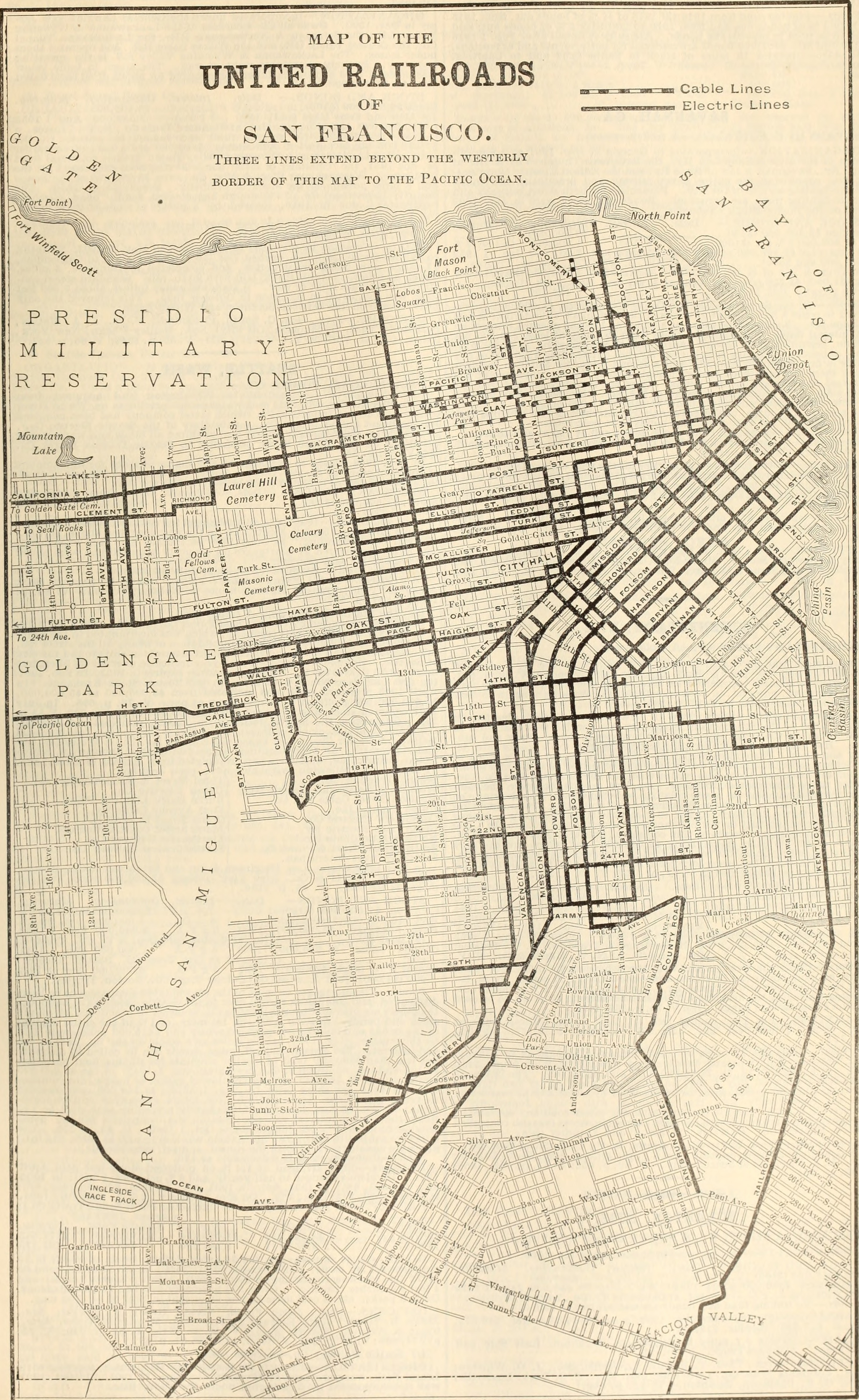
Map of United Railroads lines, 1908

Over the years many independent lines had been absorbed, including the Clay Street Hill Railroad, the San Francisco and San Mateo Electric Railway, the Presidio & Ferries Railway, and the Ferries and Cliff House Railway. Ironically the earthquake that brought so many benefits to the company also sowed the seeds of its demise, as the independent Geary Street, Park & Ocean Railway was acquired by the city and became in 1912 the beginning of the San Francisco Municipal Railway (Muni). Horsecars were finally withdrawn from city streets on June 3, 1914. By 1918, and assisted by the construction of several tunnels under the city's hills, Muni was in direct competition with the URR down the length of Market Street. The two operators each operated their own pair of rail tracks down that thoroughfare, which came to be known as the 'roar of the four'. The two Market Street Railway tracks were on the inside and the two San Francisco Municipal Railway tracks were on the outside.

Competition, labor troubles and a bad accident in 1918 led to the reorganisation of the URR, to re-emerge again as the Market Street Railway Company. This continued to operate electric streetcars throughout the city, the Powell Street. cable car lines, and a growing fleet of buses. But relations were not good with the city, who controlled their franchises, and on May 16, 1944, after defeating the proposal six times previously, voters elected to purchase the operative properties of the Market Street Railway for $7.5 million ($137 million in 2025 adjusted for inflation) and the company sold all its assets and operations to Muni.

== Surviving vehicles ==
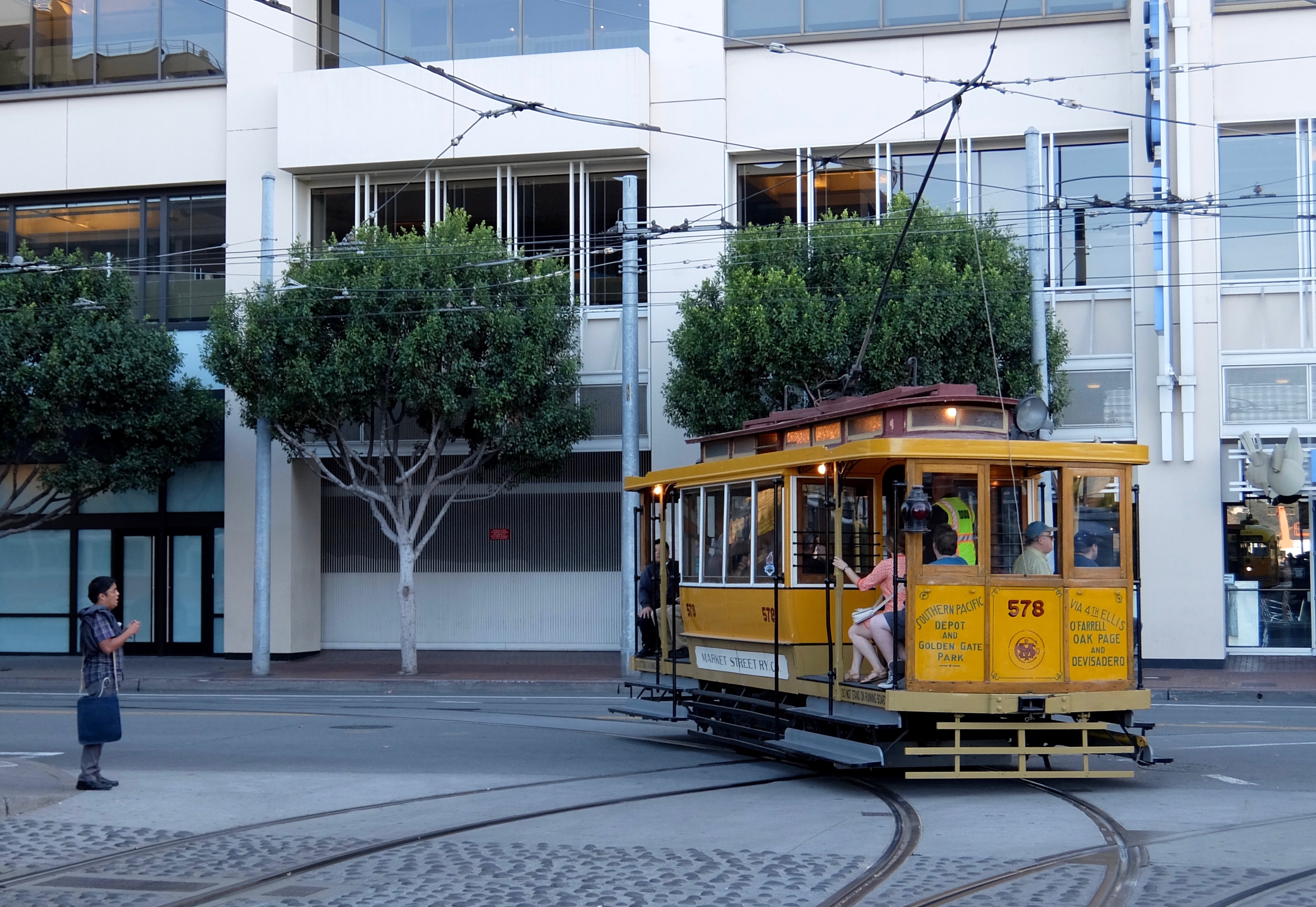
Car 578 in operation during the 2015 Muni Heritage Weekend

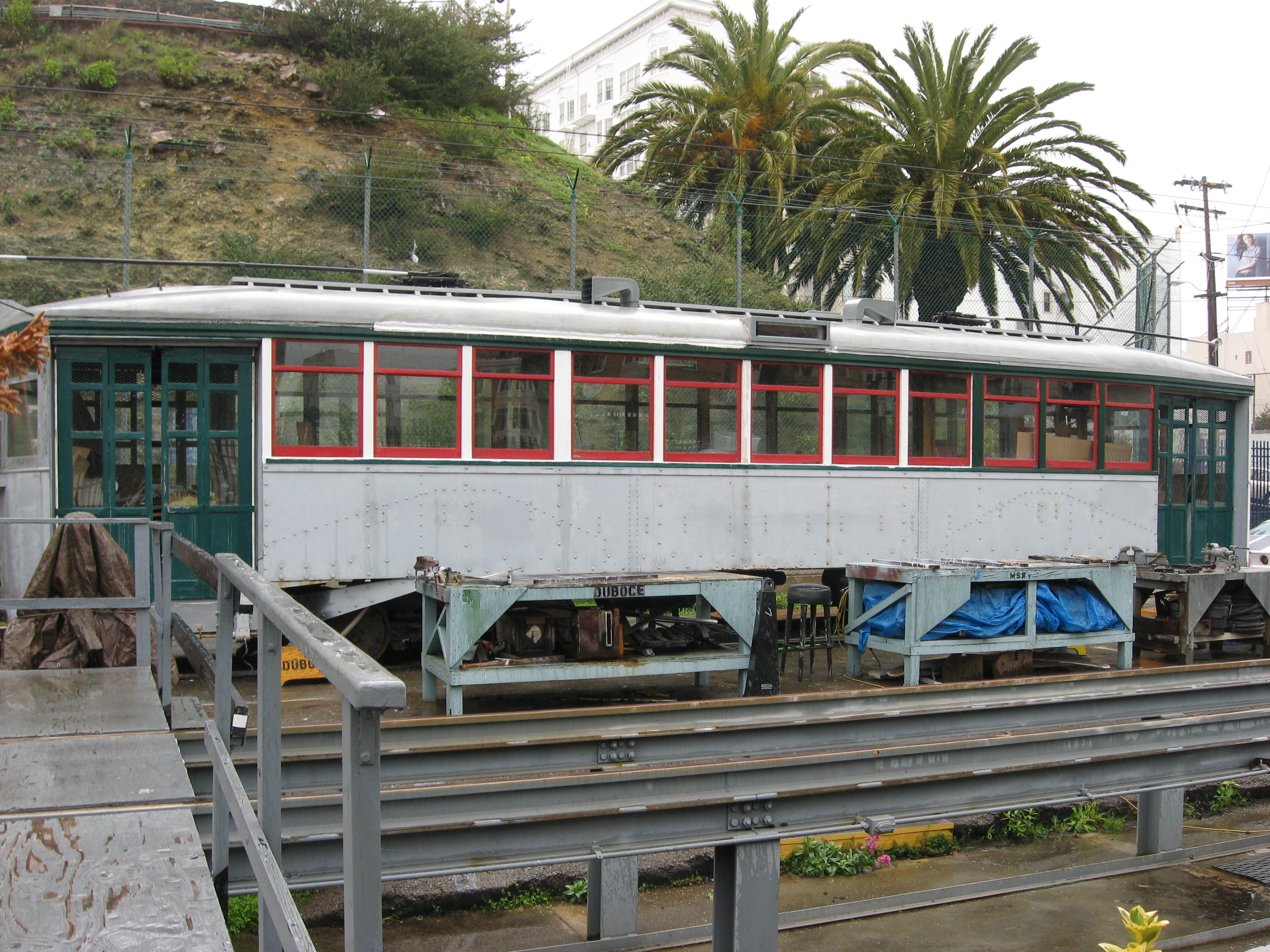
Car 798 undergoing restoration at Pharr Yard (Duboce Yard) in 2008

These are the only surviving vehicles from the Market Street Railway fleet:

=== Passenger Cars ===
- Car 578 was built in 1896 by the Hammond Car Company and is a single-truck (four-wheel), California car with open end sections and an enclosed middle compartment. After serving many years as a work car, it was eventually restored to its original form by the Muni, and is still run for special events and charters.
- Car 798 was built in the company's own shops in 1924. This car was sold for scrap after World War II. Used as a residence and jewelry store in the California town of Columbia, it was reacquired in 1984 and is currently undergoing restoration for occasional use on the F Market line.
- Car 755 was built in 1895 by the Hammond Car Company and is similar to car 578. It was sold to the Presidio & Ferries Railroad in 1906. In 1913, the Muni acquired the Presidio & Ferries upon the expiration of its operating franchise and the car continue to run in passenger service for the Muni until 1922. At that time it was converted into a work car. It was retired in 1946. It was acquired by private owners in 1947 and stored in Pescadero. It was moved to the Western Railway Museum in 1965 where it awaits restoration.
- Car 974 was built in the company's own shops, and was acquired by the Bay Area Electric Railway Association. Unfortunately, it was burned while in storage in Stockton before the formation of the Western Railway Museum.
- Parlor car "San Francisco" was built in 1901 by the St. Louis Car company as San Francisco & San Mateo 61. It was rebuilt by the United Railroads of San Francisco as parlor car available for rent named "San Francisco." In the 1920s the luxury charter business became unprofitable due to competing tour buses and automobiles and the car was converted into a school car for transporting students anywhere on the system free of charge. This came to an end due to World War II and the car was used for minimal charter service by the San Francisco Municipal Railway in 1944. It was sold for scrap in 1951 and became a hot dog stand in the Valley of the Moon. It was eventually required by the San Francisco Maritime Museum for a failed museum and donated to the Western Railway Museum in 1980.

=== Maintenance Equipment ===
- Car 0109 was built in 1891 by O'Brian and Sons in 1890 as a passenger streetcar with combination open and closed configuration similar to a Powell Street cable car for the Metropolitan Railway. In 1894 the Metropolitan Railway was acquired by the Market Street Railway. In 1900 the car was rebuilt into a motorized side dump car by WL Holman Car Company for the Market Street Railway. It was later rebuilt as a rail grinder in 1912. It became the property of the San Francisco Municipal Railway in 1944 and served as their grinder until being put on temporary loan to the Western Railway Museum in the 1970s. It was formally acquired by the Western Railway Museum in 2019.
- Car 0130 was built as an electric crane in the United Railroad of San Francisco's shops in 1904. It became Market Street Railway 0130 in 1921 and San Francisco Municipal Railway 0130 in 1944. In 1973 it was acquired by Western Railway Museum.
- Car 0304 was built by Hammond as a double-truck California car for passenger service on the San Francisco & San Mateo Electric Railway in 1900. It became United Railroads of San Francisco 673 in 1902 and was rebuilt into wrecker 0673 in 1907. It was rebuilt into United Railroads of San Francisco overhead lines maintenance car 0304 in 1910. In 1921 it became Market Street Railway 0304 and San Francisco Municipal Railway 0304 in 1944. It is still on Muni property.

== South San Francisco line ==
Through a subsidiary, the South San Francisco Railroad and Power Company, United Railways also owned and operated streetcar service in South San Francisco. The line ran from a connection with the San Mateo interurban at Leipsic Junction, south of the cemeteries, down Grand Avenue to Fuller Paints. Service ended on December 31, 1938.

== Routes ==
The last of the company's streetcar routes were discontinued or converted to bus or trolleybus by 1949. Two of the former cable lines were integrated into the current San Francisco cable car system. The company operated the following routes:

xx	Line acquired by Muni in 1944

No.	Name	Service type (1943)	Notes
1	Sutter and California	Streetcar	Streetcar service ended 1949 under Muni; continued as 1 California under Muni until 1982 when combined with former 55 Sacramento to form a new 1 California.
2	Sutter and Clement	Streetcar	Streetcar service ended 1949 under Muni
3	Sutter and Jackson	Streetcar	Streetcar service ended 1949 under Muni; became 3 Jackson trolleybus
4	Sutter and Sacramento	Streetcar, motor coach	Streetcar service ended 1948 under Muni
5	McAllister	Streetcar	Streetcar service ended 1948 under Muni; became 5 Fulton trolleybus
6	Haight and Masonic	Streetcar	Streetcar service ended 1948 under Muni; became 6 Haight/Parnassus trolleybus
7	Haight and Ocean	Streetcar	Combination of former Haight cable and Park and Ocean Railroad route, which was electrified in 1900. Through service of the two began on February 7, 1916. Streetcar service ended 1948 under Muni; trolleybus service ended 2009.
8	Market and Castro	Streetcar	Streetcar service ended 1949 under Muni with a replacement trolleybus service. Route was restored as the F Market historic streetcar in 1995.
9	Valencia Street	Streetcar	Streetcar service ended 1949 under Muni without replacement
10	Sunnyside	Motor coach	Streetcar service ended 1942
11	Mission and 24th Street	Streetcar	Streetcar service ended 1949 under Muni
12	Ingleside and Ocean	Motor coach	Streetcar service ended 1945 under Muni
14	Mission Street	Streetcar	Streetcar service ended 1949 under Muni; became 14 Mission trolleybus
15	Kearny and North Beach	Motor coach	Streetcar service ended 1941
16	3rd and Kearny		Streetcar service ended 1941
17	Haight and Ingleside	Streetcar	
18	Daly City and Cemeteries		Regular streetcar service ended 1935; one yearly franchise car ran in 1936 and 1937.
19	Ninth, Polk, and Larkin	Streetcar, motor coach	Streetcar service ended 1945 under Muni; became 19 Polk bus
20	Ellis and O'Farrel	Streetcar	
21	Hayes Street	Streetcar	Streetcar service ended 1948 under Muni; became 21 Hayes trolleybus
22	Fillmore Street	Streetcar	Streetcar service ended 1948 under Muni; became 22 Fillmore trolleybus
23	Fillmore and Valenica	Motor coach	
24	Mission and Richmond	Motor coach	Streetcar service ended 1935; became 24 Divisadero trolleybus
25	San Bruno Avenue	Streetcar, motor coach	
26	Guerrero Street	Streetcar, motor coach	
27	Bryant Street	Motor coach	Became 27 Bryant
28	Harrison Street	Motor coach	Streetcar service ended 1940
29	Kearny and Broadway		Streetcar service ended 1941
30	Army Street		Army Street extension built in 1918 to provide access to Union Iron Works. Streetcar service ended 1940.
31	Balboa Street	Streetcar	Streetcar service ended 1949 under Muni; became 31 Balboa trolleybus
32	Hayes and Oak		Streetcar service ended 1932
33	Eighth and Park	Trolleybus	Converted to trolleybus in 1935. Became 33 Ashbury/18th Street
34	6th and Sansome		Streetcar service ended 1936
35	Howard Street		The city revoked the company's Howard Street operating permit in 1939.
35	24th Street	Motor coach	
36	Folsom Street	Streetcar, motor coach	
40	San Mateo Interurban	Streetcar	Former San Francisco and San Mateo Electric Railway route.
41	Second and Market		
42	First and Fifth		Streetcar service ended 1941
43	Broadway and S.P. Depot		Streetcar service ended 1941
50	Geneva Avenue	Motor coach	
51	Silver Avenue	Motor coach	
52	Excelsior	Motor coach	
53	Southern Heights	Motor coach	
55	Sacramento Street	Motor coach	Replaced Sacramento Cable in 1942. Continued as Muni 55 Sacramento until 1982.
	Bosworth Street		Streetcar service ended 1928
	Parkside		
	Post and Leavenworth		Streetcar service ended 1934
	Visitacion Valley		Streetcar service ended 1937
	Pacific Avenue Cable		Cable service ended 1929
	Castro Street Cable		Cable service ended 1941, route integrated into 24 Mission and Richmond.
59	Powell Mason Cable	Cable car	Former Ferries & Cliff House Railway route. Integrated into the modern San Francisco cable car system.
60	Washington Jackson Cable	Cable car	Former Ferries & Cliff House Railway route. Partially integrated into the modern San Francisco cable car system.
	Fillmore Counterbalance		Part of 22 Fillmore route, closed 1941
	South San Francisco		

== See also ==
- San Francisco cable car system
- San Francisco Railway Museum
- San Francisco Municipal Railway
- Market Street Railway (nonprofit)
- San Francisco Municipal Railway fleet
