= Ferries & Cliff House Railway =

San Francisco transit company (1888–1893)

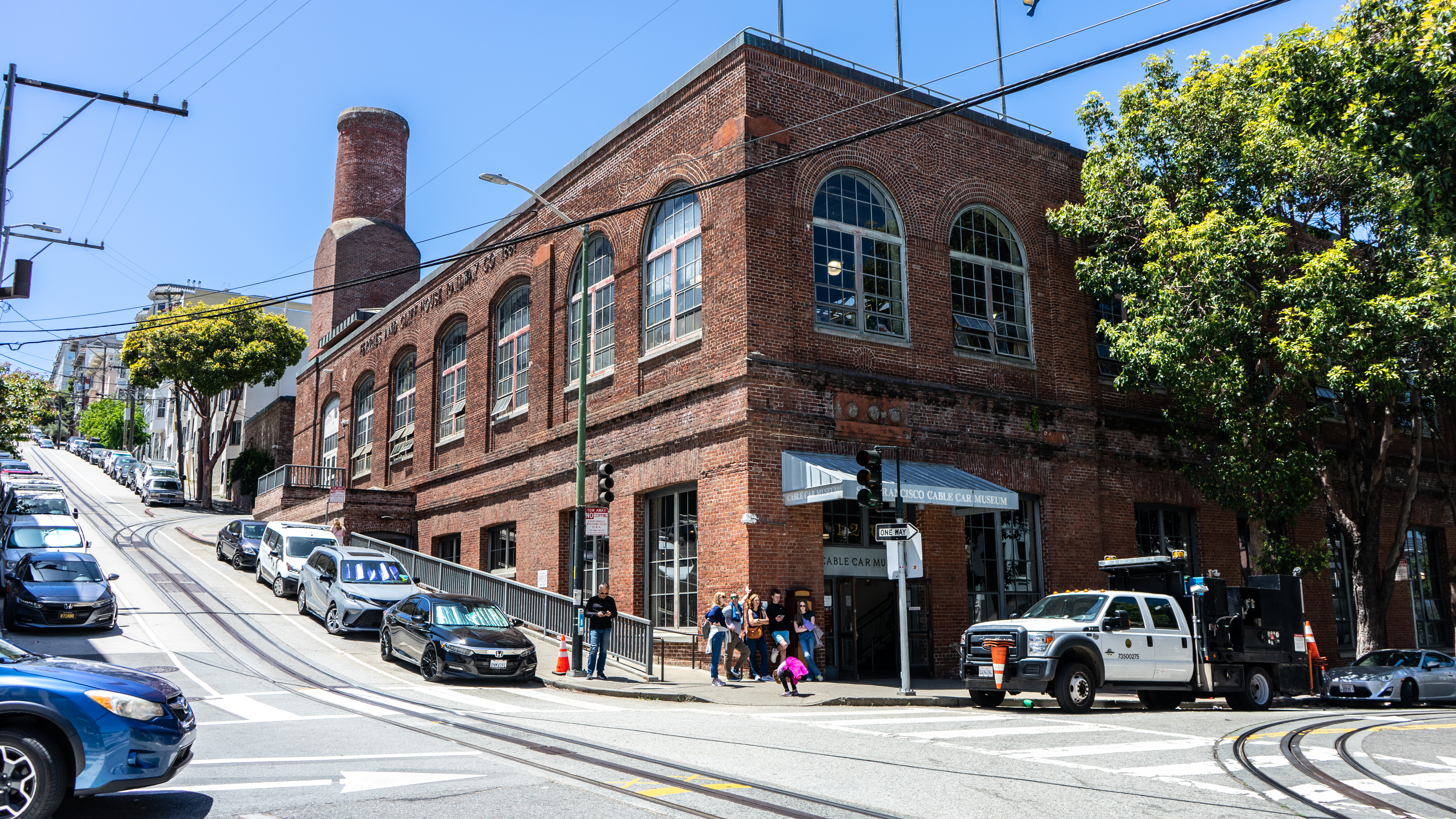
The San Francisco Cable Car Museum is located in the former Ferries & Cliff House Railway powerhouse

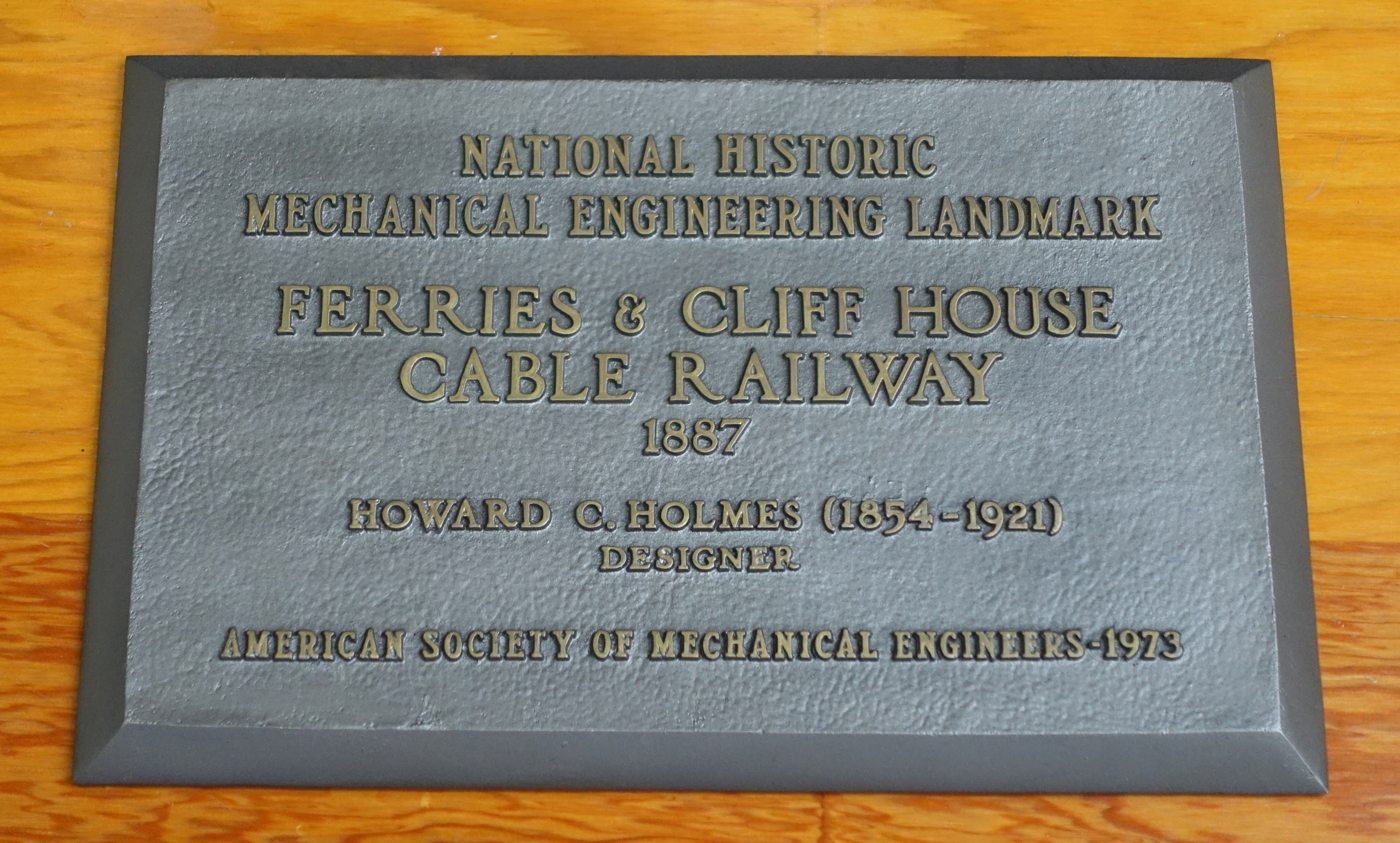
Historic Mechanical Engineering Landmark plaque for the Ferries & Cliff House Cable Railway, designated in 1973

The Ferries & Cliff House Railway was a transit company operating in San Francisco. Begun in 1888 as the Park and Cliff House Railroad, the railway operated cable car lines through the city. While initially expansive, the company struggled financially and was merged into the Market Street Railway in October 1893. The modern San Francisco cable car system features several former Ferries & Cliff House Railway assets which remain in use, including the Powell–Mason Line and the powerhouse at Washington and Mason.

== History ==
The company was reincorporated from the fledgling Powell and Jackson Street Company to form the Ferries and Cliff House Railroad in December 1887. The road was built with a 3 ft (914 mm) narrow-gauge cable railway. The first car was run over the Powell cable on March 27, 1888. The full two line Powell–Mason and Powell–Jackson system opened on April 4. A branch utilizing steam dummies was also constructed from the cable terminal west to the Cliff House; it opened on July 1. The 3 ft (914 mm) gauge line ran west along California Street and then along the coast to turn south on 48th Avenue.

Promoters of the company had purchased the pioneering Clay Street Hill Railroad the previous year, granting the new venture an easy route from Powell Street to the Ferry Terminal. The new lines on Clay and Sacramento opened on September 19.

By the end of 1888, the company had four streetcar routes:

- 1 Powell–Mason – Market via Powell to Jackson, Mason, Montgomery (later Columbus), and Taylor Street to Bay.
- 2 Powell–Jackson – Market via Powell, west on Jackson to Central (later Presidio), then south to California Street. Eastbound trips left Jackson at Steiner, then east on Washington Street to Powell.
- 3 Ferries–Jackson — Eastward from Embarcadero: Sacramento, Powell, Jackson, Central to California. Eastbound trips left Jackson at Steiner, then east on Washington Street to Stockton and Clay to the Embarcadero.
- 4 Bay Street (Horsecar) — Bay and Taylor east on Bay.

Construction of the system had left the company in debt amounting to $1.9 million. (Note: equivalent to $68.1 million in 2025 adjusted for inflation) Success of the line laid in the 5¢ (Note: equivalent to $1.79 in 2025 adjusted for inflation) fare, which included a transfer to the steam line. This greatly increased access to the seaside by providing affordable transportation. The 2,800-foot (850 m) single-track branch on Sacramento Street was rebuilt for cable operation in 1892 over a period of seventy days, considered very quick at the time. The railway was purchased by a subsidiary of the Southern Pacific Railroad and merged into a new Market Street Railway in October 1893. The system would go on to see further expansion under its new ownership.

== Rolling stock ==
The Park and Cliff House Railroad operated with six 2-4-2T Baldwins (C/N 8955, 8961, 8973, 8974, 9065 & 9073). The company was reorganized as the Ferries and Cliff House Railroad with two more 2-4-2T Baldwins (C/N 9756 & 9763) built in 1889. These locomotives were widely distributed during the first decade of the 20th century. One went to the Diamond and Caldor Railway, one to the Oahu Railway and Land Company, one to the San Jose and Santa Clara Electric Company, one to the Glynn and Peterson Lumber Company, and two to the Red River Lumber Company in Westwood, California.

== Remnants ==
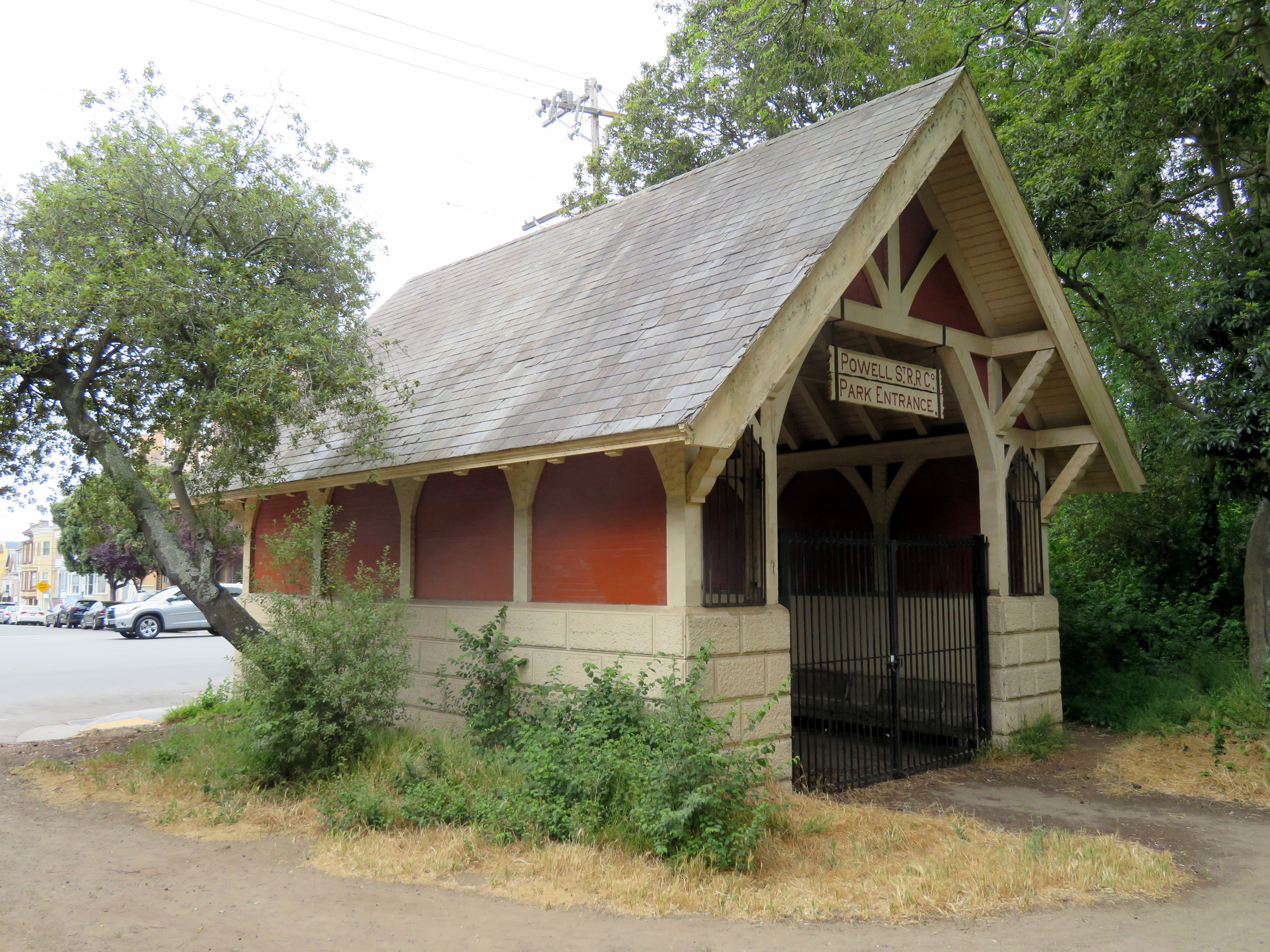
The Powell Street Railroad steam train depot at Golden Gate Park, 2018

In addition to the cable car infrastructure, the Golden Gate Park depot at 7th and Fulton still stands and displays Powell Street Railway signage. Lands End Trail, a recreational path in the Golden Gate National Recreation Area, utilizes part of the line.

Car number 15 of the modern San Francisco cable car system is a recreation of the rolling stock utilized on the Powell–Mason line between 1893 and 1905. It was built by Muni in 2009.
