= Park and Ocean Railroad =

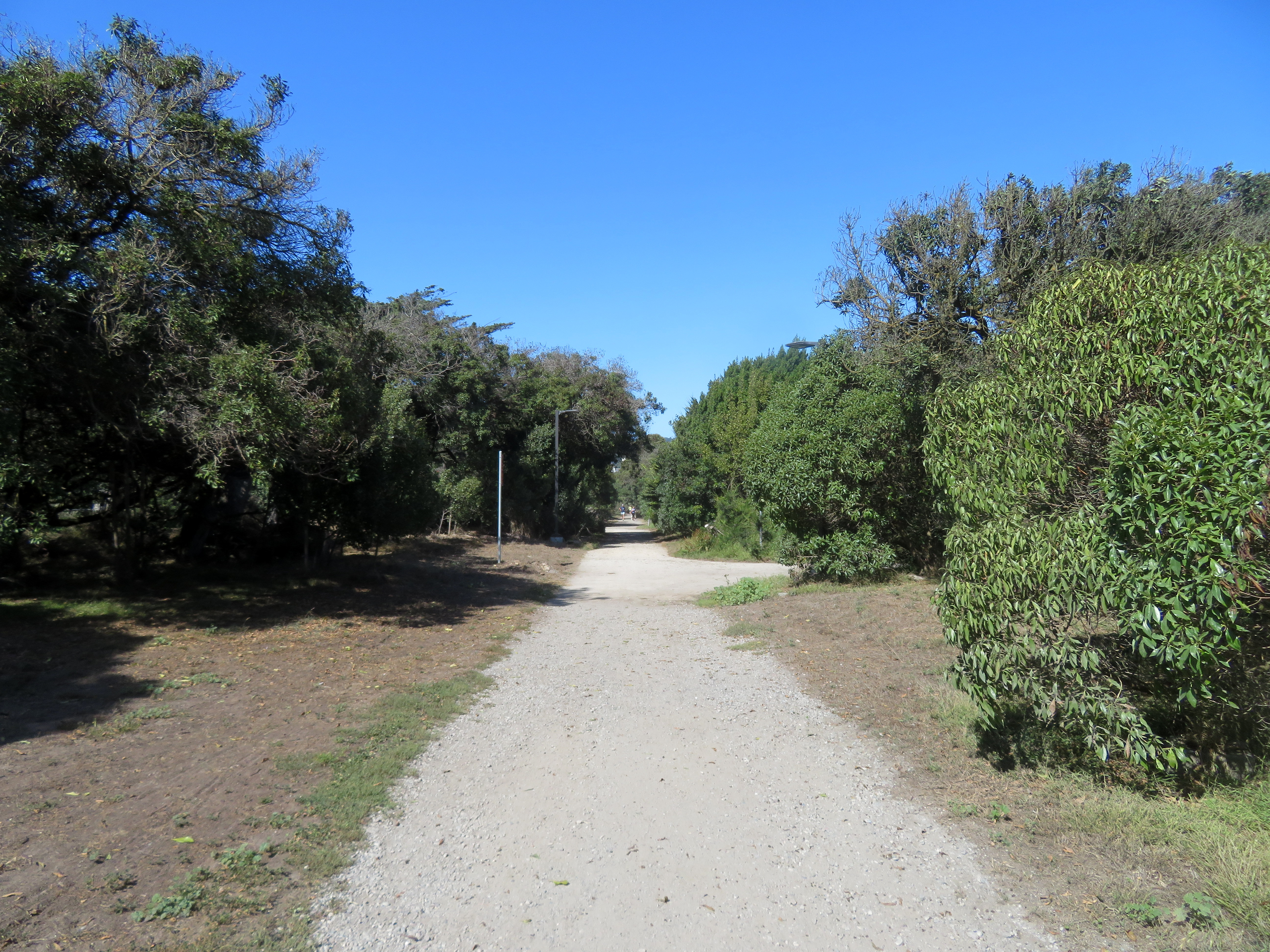
- Path on the former alignment in Golden Gate Park

Overview
- Locale: San Francisco, California

History
- Commenced: October 5, 1883
- Opened: December 1, 1883

Technical
- Line length: 8.57 mi (13.79 km)
- Number of tracks: 2
- Track gauge: 1,435 mm (4 ft 8 1/2 in) standard gauge

The Park and Ocean Railroad was a railroad in San Francisco, California. It ran along Lincoln Way on the south edge of Golden Gate Park and then turned north into the western end of the Park along La Playa Street. The company was a mechanism of the Market Street Railway, initially being a steam-powered extension of that company's Haight Street cable line, operated virtually with the same management.

Grading of the line commenced on October 5, 1883. The railway was double tracked and laid to standard gauge. It ran from Haight and Stanyan Streets westward, then diagonally southwest to run along the southern edge of Golden Gate Park. Under the driveway of the park, the railroad required a short tunnel which was built in three weeks. The line also featured a new depot built inside the boundaries of the park. Revenue service began on December 1, 1883, fewer than two months after construction began. Papers reported that the road carried thousands of people to the beach on the first Sunday service.

The line was formally merged in to the Market Street Railway in October 1894. It was electrified in 1899, becoming part of the 7 Haight streetcar line.

== Rolling stock ==
Initially the line utilized four locomotives built by Baldwin Locomotive Works in November 1880 for the Central Pacific Railroad but lettered Market Street, Park & Cliff Railroad. These four 0-4-2T (tank locomotives) (C/N 5357, 5357, 5375 & 5377) were joined by four 2-4-2T Baldwins (C/N 7201, 7203, 7238 & 7243) built in March 1884. When the line was electrified, Locomotive #1 went to the Mendocino Lumber Company, three of the 2-4-2Ts went to Canadian Collieries, and the remaining four became Southern Pacific Transportation Company numbers 20, 21, 22 and 80. Number 20 was preserved at Travel Town Museum in 1954.
