= Zieliński =

Zieliński (Polish pronunciation: [ʑɛˈlij̃skʲi]; feminine Zielińska, plural Zielińscy) is the eighth most common surname in Poland (91,522 people in 2009), and is also common in other countries in various forms. The first Polish records of the surname date to the 15th century. Without diacritical marks, it is spelled Zielinski. The Russianized form is Zelinski (Зелинский).

== Origin ==
Polish surnames ending in "-ski" are of toponymic origin, meaning they identify someone as an inhabitant of a given community, and not through association with what the name's root meant. Thus, given the great number of similarly named localities, linguistically Zielin, Zielinca, Zieliniec and Zielińsk would be the most perfect matches. Some others might include Zieleniec, Zielinice, Zieleniew, Zieleniewo, Zieleń, Zielęcice, Zielięcin, Zielniczki, Zielniki and Zielona.

- Polish: a toponymic surname, with the toponym stemming from the word zieleń, meaning the color green, or referring to vibrancy and youth. It also could have originated from the word 'zioło', meaning plant or herb.
- Jewish (Ashkenazic, from Poland): a habitational name for someone from places in Poland called Zielona or Zielonka, deriving from the root word meaning green.
- German: the name is also particularly well-established in Germany due to migration patterns over centuries. The Germanized version of this surname is Zelinsky or Saleznicky, usually found in the Silesia region.

== Clans and Polish coats of arms ==
Due to the sheer size and frequency distribution of the name, it is difficult to trace common origins or use of armigerous coats of arms (herby) in the Polish clan system.

== People ==
- Adrian Zieliński (born 1989), Polish weightlifter
- Andrzej Zieliński (disambiguation), multiple individuals
- Anna Zielińska-Głębocka (born 1949), Polish politician
- Anthony Zielinski (1965-2011), American city treasurer
- Chad Zielinski (born 1964), American Catholic bishop
- Damian Zieliński (born 1981), Polish cyclist
- Edmund Zieliński (1909–1992), Polish ice hockey player
- Ewa Zielińska (born 1972), Polish Paralympic athlete
- Genia Zielinska (1891–1966) American soprano
- Halina Mastalerz (née Zielińska; born 1950), Polish politician and factory worker
- Henryk Zieliński (1920–1981), Polish historian
- Izabella Zielińska (1910–2017), Polish pianist and pedagogue
- Jacek Zieliński (disambiguation), multiple individuals
- Jan Zieliński (born 1996), Polish tennis player
- Jarosław Zieliński (born 1960), Polish politician
- Jerzy Zieliński (disambiguation), multiple individuals
- Lidia Zielińska (born 1953), Polish composer
- Maciej Zielinski (born 1971), Polish composer
- Marian Zieliński (1929–2005), Polish weightlifter
- Paul Zielinski (1911–1966), German footballer
- Paweł Zieliński (born 1990), Polish footballer
- Piotr Zieliński (born 1994), Polish footballer
- Rajmund Zieliński (1940–2022), Polish cyclist
- Ricardo Zielinski (born 1959), Argentine football player and manager
- Tadeusz Zieliński (disambiguation), multiple individuals
- Thaddeus Zielinski (1916–1990), American bishop
- Tomasz Zieliński (born 1990), Polish weightlifter
- Tony Zielinski (born 1961), American politician
- Urszula Zielińska (born 1977), Polish politician
- Wiktor Zieliński (born 2001), Polish pool player
- Władysław Zieliński (1935–2025), Polish sprint canoer
- Zygmunt Zieliński (1858–1925), Polish general
- Zofia Zielińska (born 1944), historian
