= Strength tester =

Strength tester may refer to:

- Grippers, a device used for testing and increasing the strength of the hands
- High striker, a attraction that operates by utilizing the lever where one end holds a puck attached to the tower and the other end is struck by the person or contestant using a hammer or mallet
- Strength tester machine, a type of amusement personality tester machine, which upon receiving credit rates the subject's strength, according to how strongly the person presses levers, squeezes a grip or punches a punching bag

== See also ==
- Container compression test, a test that measures the compressive strength of packages
- Izod impact strength test, a method of determining the impact resistance of materials
- Universal testing machine, a machine used to test the tensile strength and compressive strength, flexural strength, bending, shear, hardness, and torsion testing, providing valuable data for designing and ensuring the quality of materials
