= Zelinski (disambiguation) =

Zelinski is a Slavic surname.

Zelinski or Zelinsky may refer to:

- 3042 Zelinsky, an asteroid
- Zelinskiy (crater), a lunar impact crater
- Zelinski, a suffix of a number of settlements whose name is derived from Sveti Ivan Zelina, Croatia
