= Spring Lake Arcade =

Amusement center in Rhode Island, U.S.

General information
- Address: 52 Old Hillside Drive
- Town or city: Burrillville, Rhode Island
- Country: United States
- Coordinates: 41°59′11.04″N 71°39′24.12″W
- Opened: 1930

Website
- springlakearcade.com/homepage.html

Spring Lake Arcade is an amusement center in Burrillville, Rhode Island. It was opened in 1930 and is believed to be the oldest penny arcade business in America.

The place is known for offering classic arcade games.

== History ==
Edmund Reed opened Spring Lake Arcade by the beach in 1930. It began operating with a walking charlie game. The establishment is known for its coin operated machines which accept pennies, dimes, nickels and quarters. They are purchased from the Mills Novelty Company around the 1930s. By 1938, Spring Lake Arcade featured more amusement and became a bustling attraction in Rhode Island.

In 1988, John Bateman bought Spring Lake Arcade. The building was razed in 1998 and was modernly reconstructed thereafter.

== Features ==
Half of the amusement in Spring Lake Arcade are antiques that would date back as far as the 1920s. These include the toy-rifle ranges, pinball machines, a strength tester machine and a skee-ball machine. The arcade aims to acquire, preserve and operate historical amusement machines.

Spring Lake Arcade is situated by the Spring Lake beach and opens during summer.
