= Mohammad Mottahedan =

Mohammad Matt Mottahedan is a collector and consultant in contemporary International Art, as well as a figure in the contemporary Iranian art scene, as a panelist and judge for art competitions, such as Magic of Persia. He is currently based in London.

== Biography ==
Born in Iran, Mottahedan studied French in Paris before moving to the United States in the early 1980s to pursue Fine Arts. Around 1985, he began building close relationships with contemporary artists and started collecting. From there, he assembled an extensive collection of historically significant works, including pieces by notable artists of the time, including those of Jeff Koons, Peter Halley, Carroll Dunham, Christopher Wool, Cindy Sherman, Barbara Kruger, Albert Oehlen, Dana Schutz, Aaron Curry, and Pietro Roccasalva. The collection, Once Upon a Time in America.

== Mottahedan Projects ==
Mottahedan Projects (MP) is not defined by a physical location but rather by a deep passion for contemporary art, which began in the 1980s with the collection of modern works, eventually documented in the book Once Upon a Time in America. Since then, MP has broadened its vision by showcasing both emerging and established artists like Peter Halley, Aaron Gilbert, Matthew Monahan, Andrzej Zieliński, Skyler Brickley, and Pietro Roccasalva in project spaces across Dubai, Tehran, and London. MP's dedication extends beyond personal collecting, MP has been involved as an art advisor with a diverse range of artists, including established names like Cindy Sherman, George Condo, and Dana Schutz, as well as rising talents such as Salman Toor, Shara Hughes, and Lynette Yiadom-Boakye. MP also guides collectors in acquiring works by institutionally supported artists like Rashid Johnson, Emily Mae Smith, and Nicolas Party, alongside culturally resonant figures like Bridget Riley, Toyin Ojih Odutola, Fred Eversley, and Jadé Fadojutimi.
