= Zelinski =

Zelinski, Zelinsky, Zelinskii or Zelinskiy (Russian: Зелинский) is a masculine surname, a Russified form of the Polish surname Zieliński, meaning the color green. Its feminine counterpart in Russia is Zelinskaia or Zelinskaya.

The East Slavic surname of the same etymology is Zelenski, notably worne by the president of Ukraine Volodymyr Zelenskyy. Likewise for the Polish surname Żeleński.

Notable people with the surname include:

- Corneliu Zelinski (1899–1938), birth name of Corneliu Zelea Codreanu, Romanian ultranationalist politician
- Daniel Zelinsky (1922–2015), American mathematician
- Dean Zelinsky, American guitar luthier
- Edward Zelinsky, American legal scholar
- Edward Galland Zelinsky, creator of the Musée Mécanique
- Elizabeth Zelinski, American neuroscientist
- Indrek Zelinski (born 1974), Estonian football player and coach
- Jeff Zelinski, Canadian football player
- Leo Zelinsky, a fictional character in the Marvel Universe
- Nikolay Zelinsky (1861–1953), Russian chemist
- Paul O. Zelinsky, American author and illustrator
- Wilbur Zelinsky, American geographer
