= Zelensky (surname) =

Zelensky is a Slavic masculine surname.

Its Russian spelling Зеленский is romanized Zelenski, Zelenskii, Zelenskiy, or Zelensky, and originates from the toponym Zelyonoe (Зелёное), meaning 'green'. Its feminine counterpart is Зеленская (Zelenskaya or Zelenskaia).

Its Ukrainian spelling Зеленський is romanized Zelenskyi, Zelensky, Zelenskiy, or Zelenskyy, and originates from the toponym Zelene (Зелене), meaning 'green'. Its feminine counterpart is Зеленська (Zelenska).

Its Lithuanian spelling is Zelenskis or Zilinskas.

Notable people with the surname include:

- Aleksei Zelensky (born 1971), Russian luger
- Andrey Zelenskiy (born 1963), Russian composer and pianist
- Anne Zelensky (born 1935), French feminist author and activist
- Elena Zelenskaya (born 1961), Russian opera soprano
- Igor Zelensky (born 1969), Russian ballet dancer
- Isaak Zelensky (1890–1938), Russian politician
- Olena Zelenska (born 1978), First Lady of Ukraine
- Varvara Zelenskaya (born 1972), Russian alpine ski racer
- Volodymyr Zelenskyy (born 1978), President of Ukraine

== See also ==
- Zelinski (surname)
- Żeleński, a Polish princely family

== Sources ==
- Ganžina, Irina M. (2001). Словарь современных русских фамилий [Dictionary of modern Russian surnames] (in Russian) (Naučno-populjaranoe ed.). Moskva: Ast [u.a.] ISBN 5-271-00127-X. Archived from the original on 20 June 2015.
