= Jerzy Zieliński =

Jerzy Zieliński may refer to:

- Jerzy Zieliński (cinematographer) (born 1950), Polish cinematographer
- Jerzy Zieliński (diplomat) (1925–1986), Polish diplomat and politician
- Jerzy Zieliński (painter) (1943–1980), Polish painter
- Jerzy Zieliński (botanist), Polish botanist
