= Andrzej Zieliński =

Andrzej Zieliński may refer to:

- Andrzej Zieliński (athlete) (1936–2021), Polish sprinter
- Andrzej Zieliński (artist) (born 1976), American visual artist
- Andrzej Zieliński (musician) (born 1944), Polish musician and composer; see List of Christmas carols § Polish
- Andrzej Zieliński (actor) (born 1962), Polish actor
- Andrzej Zieliński (politician), Ministry of Culture and National Heritage (Poland)
