= Love tester machine =

Type of amusement personality tester machine

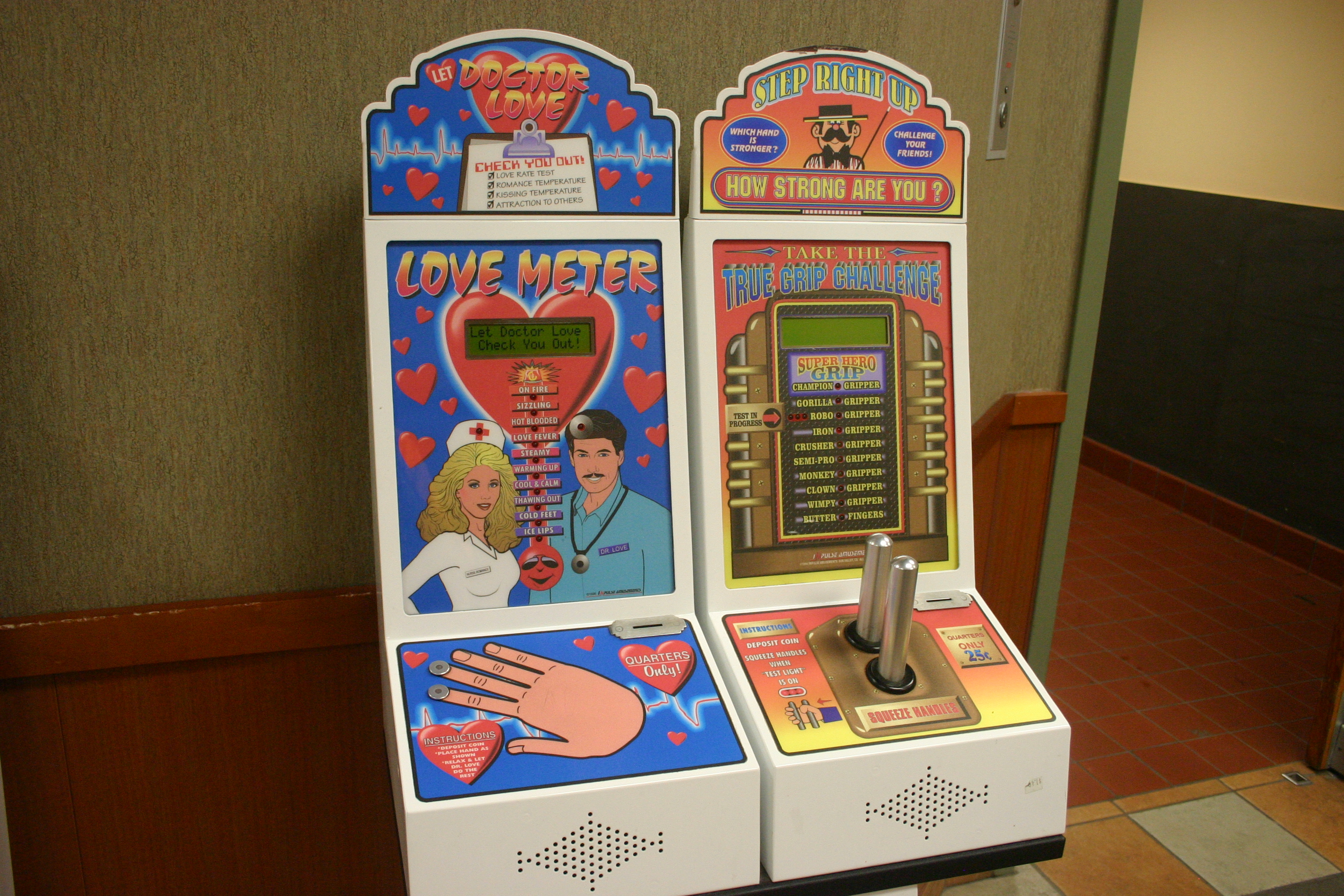
A Love Meter (left) beside a strength tester machine at a Framingham, Massachusetts rest stop

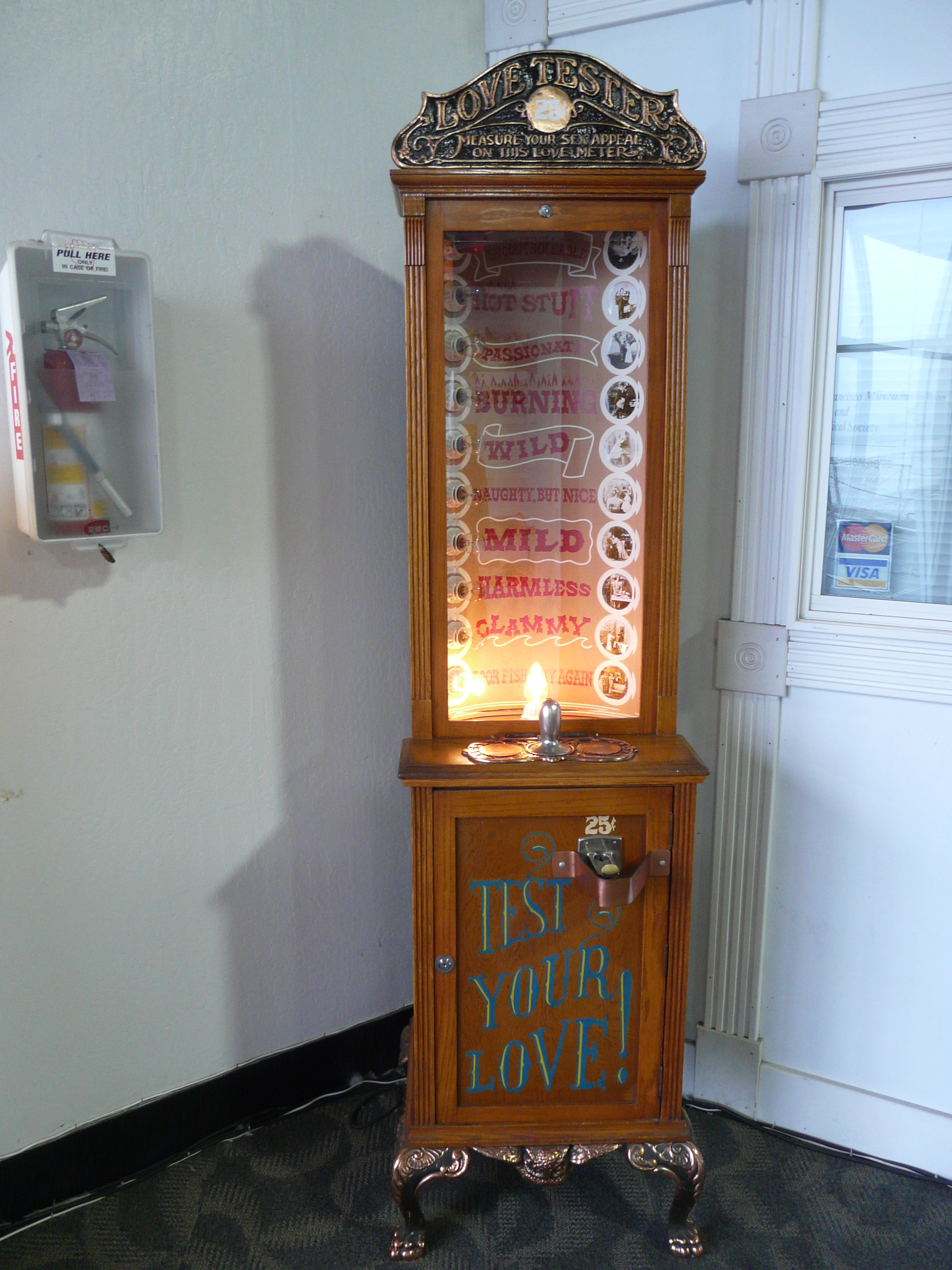
A vintage Love Tester machine at Musée Mécanique

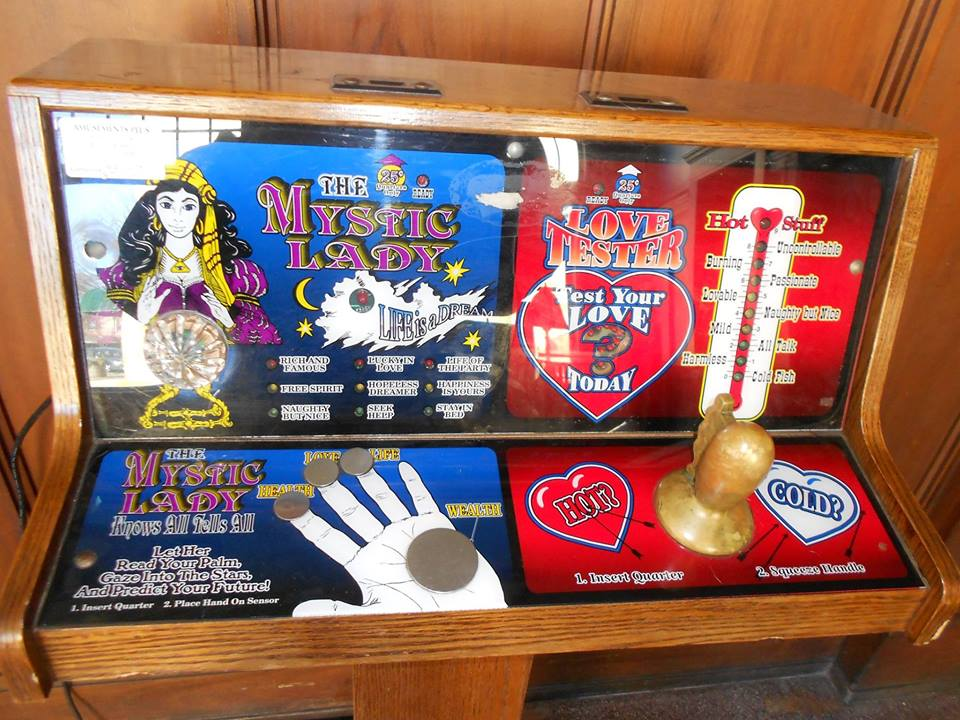
An electronic fortune teller and love tester manufactured in the mid-1990s

A love tester machine (also called love meter or love teller) is a type of amusement personality tester machine, which upon receiving credit tries to rate the subject's sex appeal, love abilities or romantic feelings for someone. Many love testers measure the moisture on the skin surface of the subject's hands by electrically testing the skin conductance and rates accordingly. Others measure the temperature of the skin. However, some machines just use a random generator. Love meters could be found in penny arcades, and can be seen in modern video arcades, amusement parks, in bars and restaurants. Such vending machines are for amusement purposes only and do not actually give a real result. Nintendo, before entering the video game industry, released their own handheld love tester.

== Digital versions ==
Pinball Hall of Fame: The Gottlieb Collection includes a simulation of a real world love meter. Similar games can also be found on the Internet or as software applications. Software love testers are based on randomness, on various user inputs or on a questionnaire and an algorithm. Only serious surveys and analyses can thereby aim to give a real result.

== Gallery ==
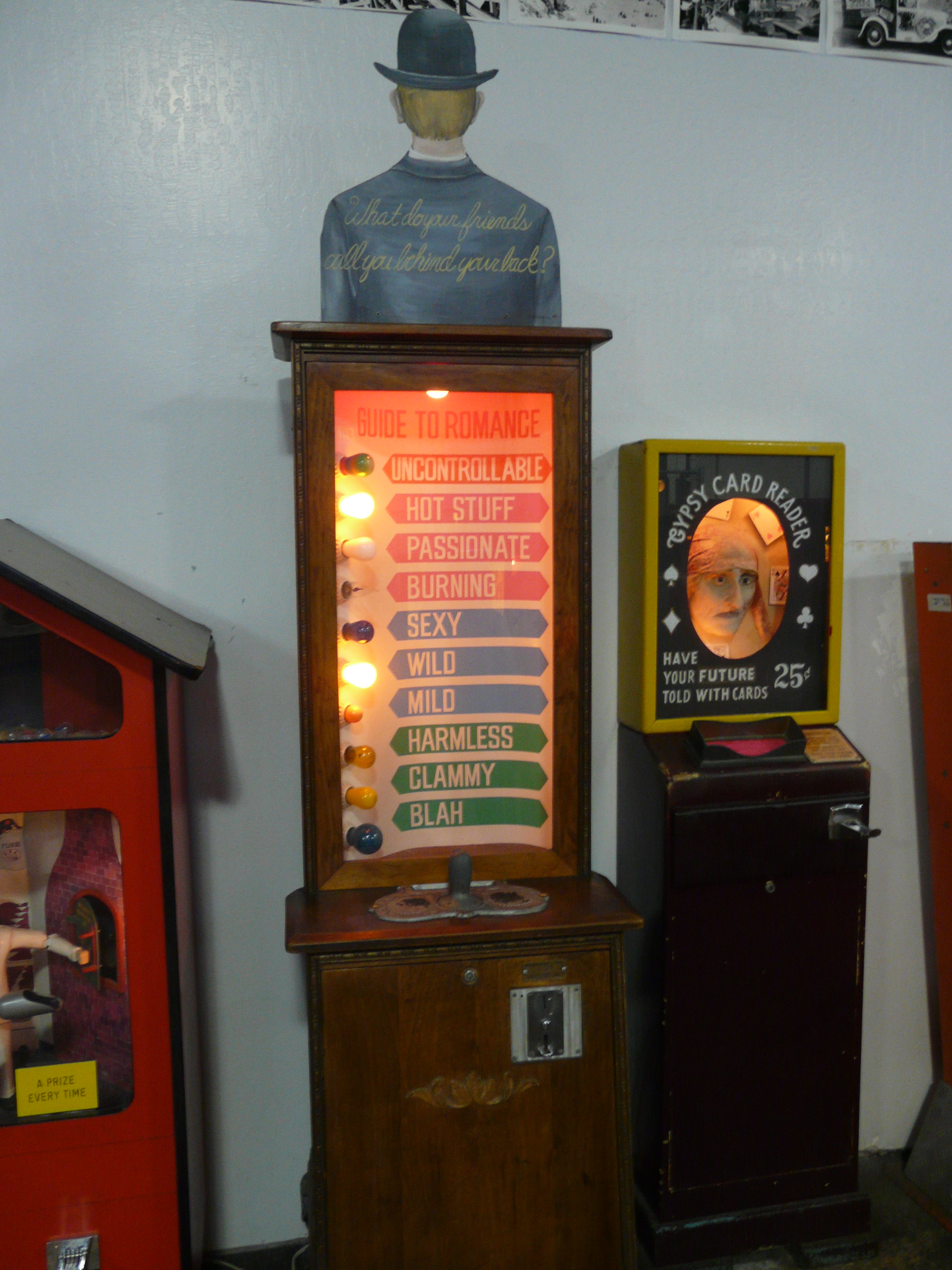

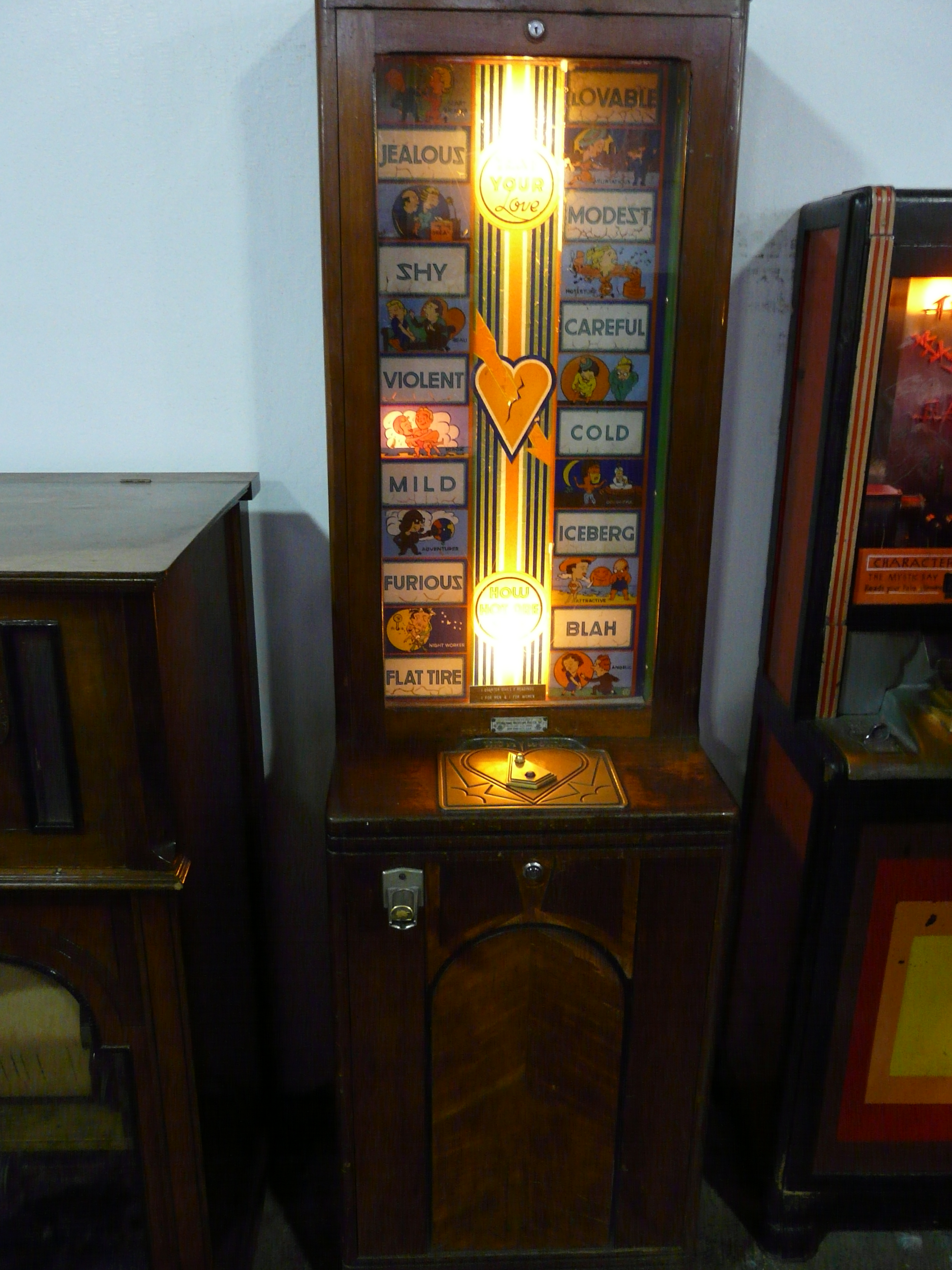

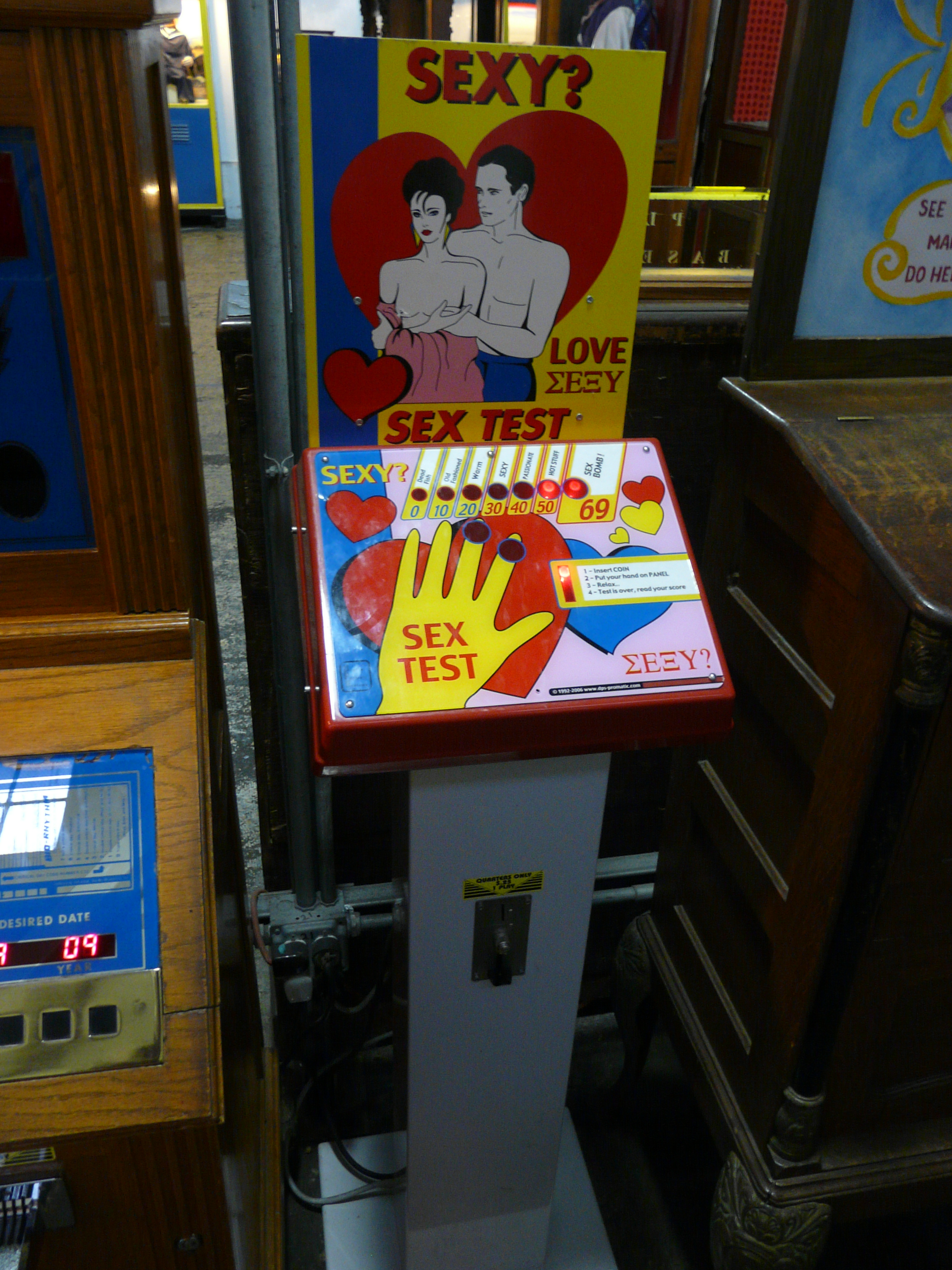

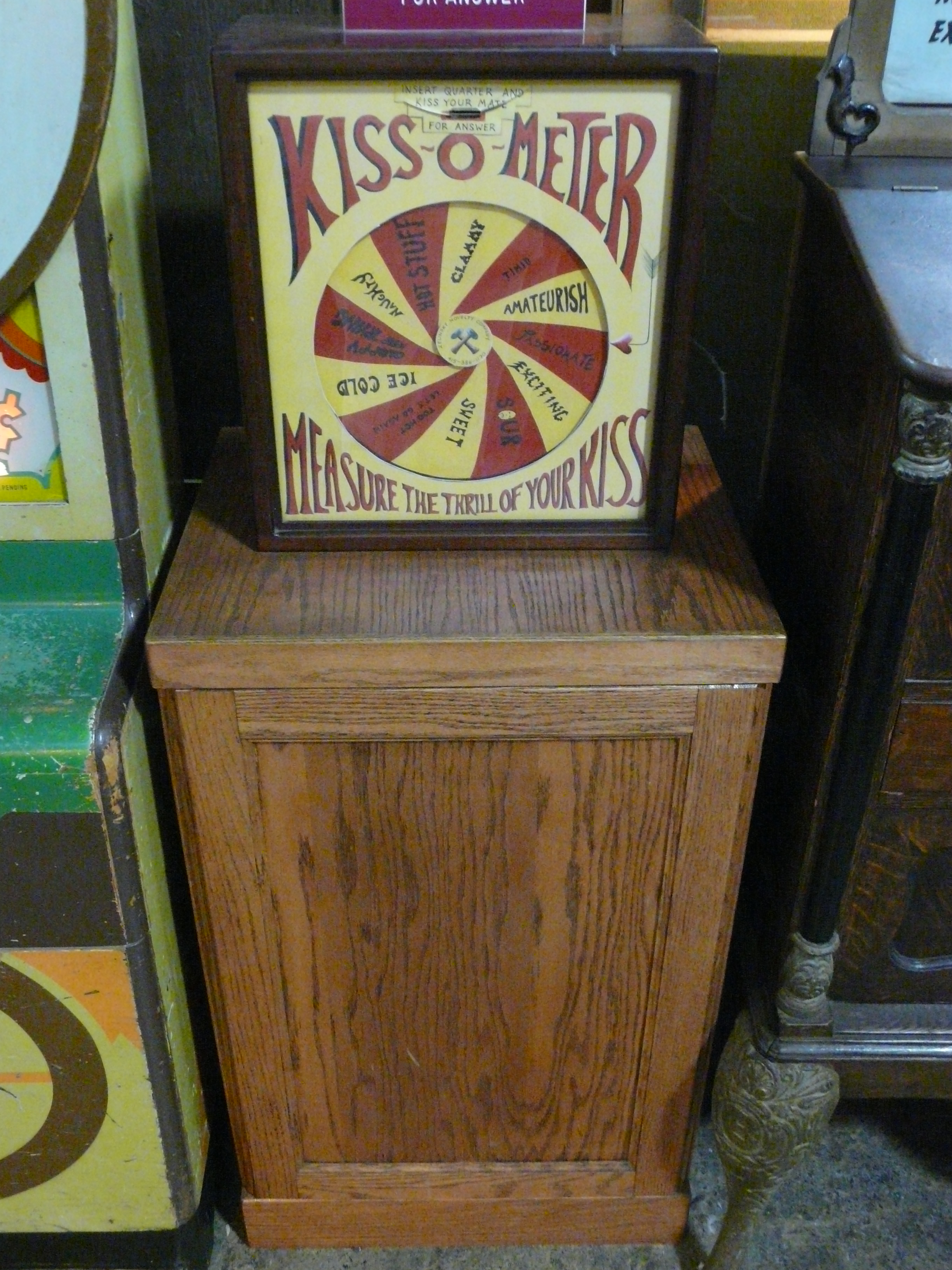

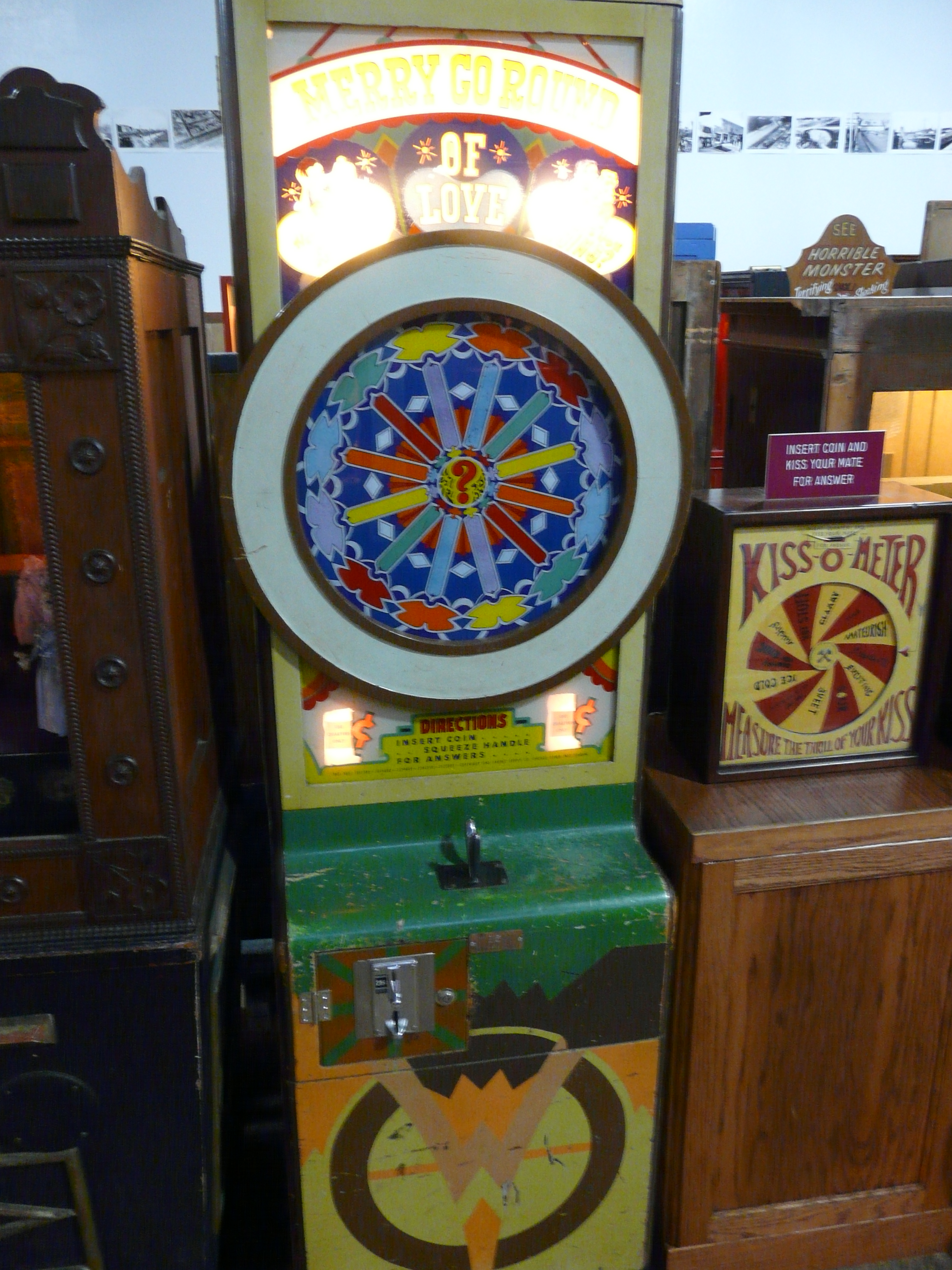

== See also ==
- E-meter
- Fortune teller machine
- Hand boiler – a glass sculpture sometimes used as a collector's item to measure love
- Love Tester – a novelty toy made by Nintendo that tries to determine how much two people love each other
- Strength tester machine
