= Kazimierzów, Opoczno County =

Kazimierzów
- Village
- Location within Poland
- Coordinates: 51°19′N 20°7′E
- Country: Poland
- Voivodeship: Łódź
- County: Opoczno
- Gmina: Paradyż

Kazimierzów [kaʑiˈmjɛʐuf] is a village in the administrative district of Gmina Paradyż, within Opoczno County, Łódź Voivodeship, in central Poland.

== Notable people ==
- Jerzy Zieliński (1943–1980), painter and poet
