= Jerzy Zieliński (painter) =

Polish painter and poet (1943–1980)

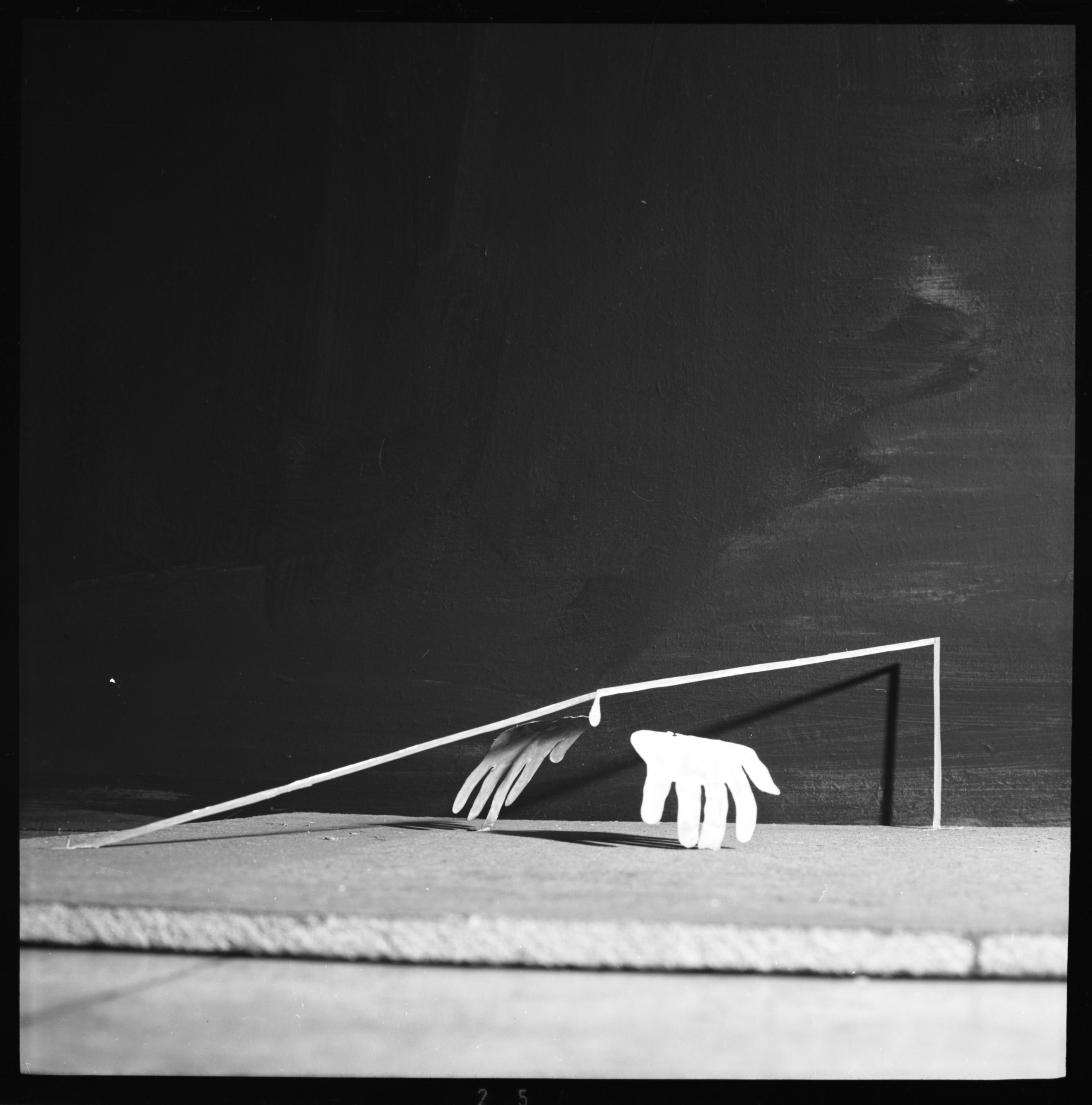
- An image of Zieliński's piece Ucieczka z raju, 1970. From the collections of the Wrocław Contemporary Museum
- Born: Jerzy Ryszard Zieliński; 1943; Kazimierzów, Reichsgau Wartheland, Nazi Germany
- Died: 1980 (aged 36–37); Warsaw, Warsaw Voivodeship, Polish People's Republic
- Education: Academy of Fine Arts
- Style: Conceptual art

Jerzy Ryszard "Jurry" Zieliński (1943–1980) was a Polish painter and poet.

== Biography ==
Zieliński was born in Kazimierzów, in German occupied Poland, in 1943. He graduated from the Warsaw Academy of Fine Arts in 1968, with a diploma in painting. He died in Warsaw in 1980.

His artistic style was inspired by pop art and Art Nouveau, and his work in turn inspired many young artists, such as the art groups Gruppa and Twożywo. In 1965, he and Jan Dobkowski founded the art group Neo Neo Neo. His artworks have been described as "znaki drogowe politycznej egzystencji w PRL" (transl. road signs of political existence in the PRL (Polish People's Republic)). In 2010, on the 30th anniversary of Zieliński's death, a two-piece bumper gallery exhibition was held at the National Museum in Kraków, celebrating his life and work. The exhibition was accompanied by the publication of a 300-page monograph, which analysed the historical significance and contemporary relevance of Zieliński's work.
