= High striker =

Attraction used in funfairs, fundraisers, and carnivals

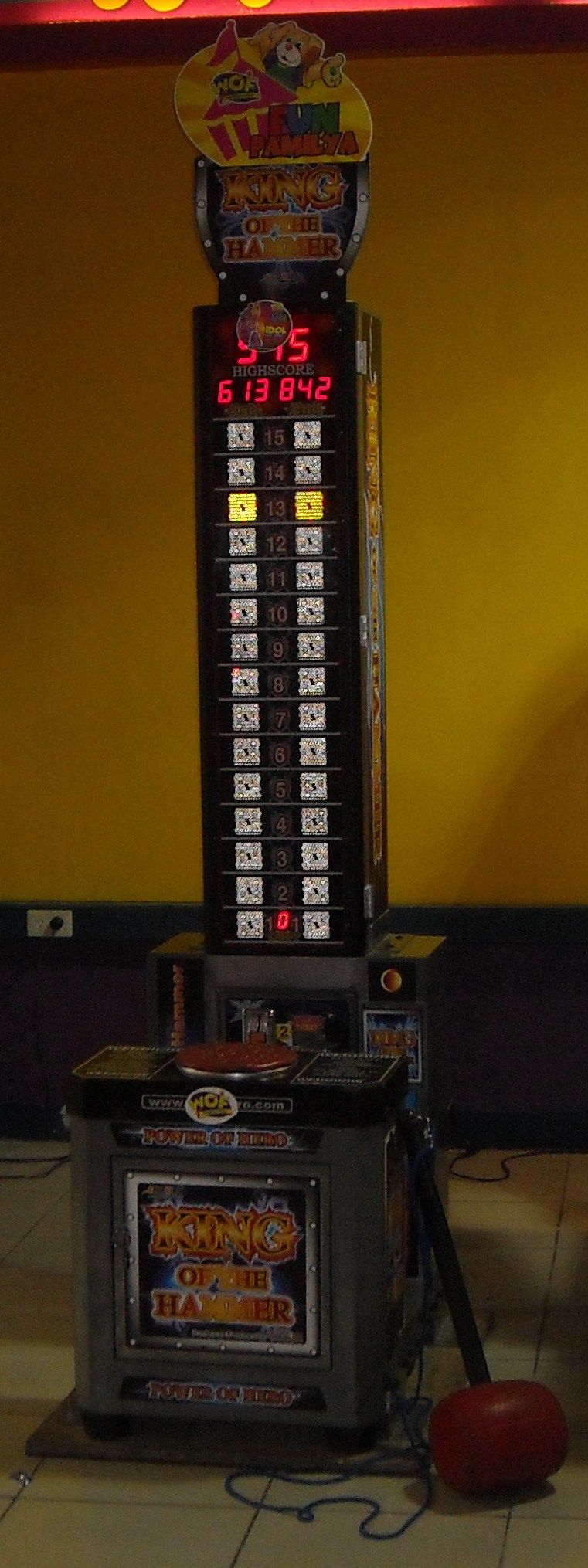
King of the Hammer, made by Andamiro, is a modern high striker game. Instead of a hockey puck, the score is represented by lights that illuminate to show the strength of the hit. This version also vends out tickets.

A high striker, also known as a strength tester, or strongman game, is an attraction used in funfairs, amusement parks, fundraisers, and carnivals. It operates by utilizing the lever where one end holds a puck attached to the tower and the other end is struck by the person or contestant using a hammer or mallet. The aim of players is to ring the bell suspended on top of the tower. If the lever is struck with enough force, the puck will rise high enough to hit the bell, indicating a success. Modern versions use a spring-loaded version of the lever, while others use an enclosed striking mechanism.

Operators traditionally (or stereotypically) entice people to try the high striker with phrases such as: "Step right up!","Test your strength!", or "Who are the men out of the boys?"

== Construction ==
A high striker is usually composed of a heavy base, a long vertical tower, a bell, a puck, a lever, and a mallet. Initial versions of the base were of frame construction; later models were of unibody construction. The puck/dinger/chaser is suspended to a small groove that runs along the tower's length and can move freely up or down. The bell is identical to that of a traditional school bell in construction, mainly because it is to be struck from the side (bottom). Levers were traditionally constructed with a rubber padding above and below the end where the mallet is supposed to strike, in order to amplify the force and protect the lever. Long-handled 10-pound rubber mallets are used, but can vary depending on the high striker's size.

== Types ==
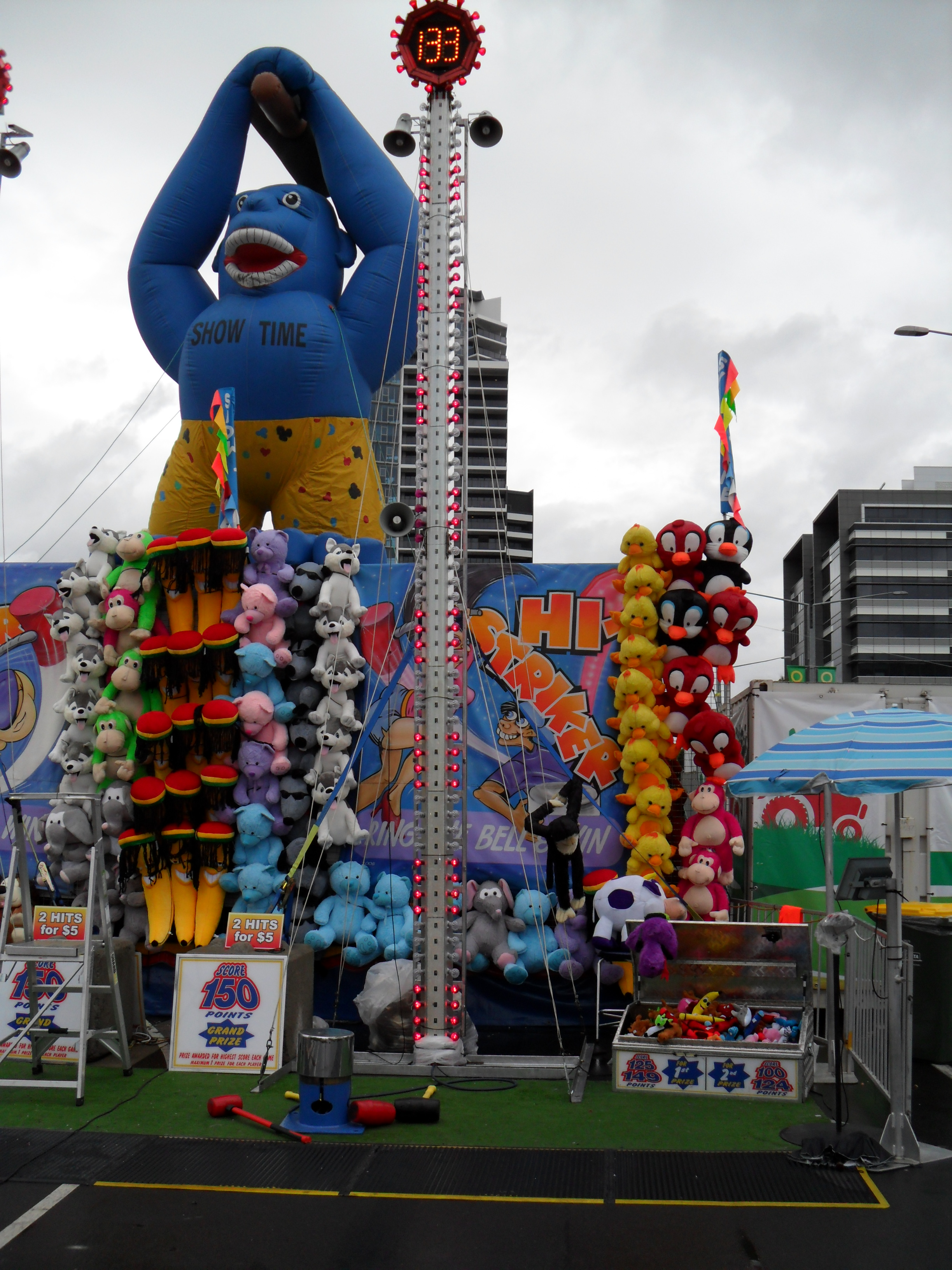

High strikers come in different shapes and sizes. Heights range from 4 to 20 feet (1.2 to 6.1 meters). There are many brands of high strikers commercially available. Most models use a spring-loaded lever that can be adjusted to increase or decrease the force required to propel the puck to hit the bell.

Other high strikers are themed in design. The tower can feature an image of a tall person, with the bell representing a part of the head.

Electronic high strikers exist in arcades. These variants are not as real-time as the more popular high striker. When the target is hit by the player, sensors underneath determine a measured amount of distance that the puck will climb. Depending on the force, the game will indicate how the player ranked, ranging from poor to excellent.

== Social effect ==
In the 1930s, some high striker operators preyed on young men and rigged (or fixed) the high striker unit to prevent anyone, no matter how strong, from striking the bell. They usually picked a small man to demonstrate how easy it was to swing the mallet and impact the arm, ringing the bell. Then, when a stronger person (usually a young man in his late teens and early 20s) attempted, they failed. Players attempted the game repeatedly to avoid humiliation. Eventually, the operator would allow that player to ring the bell so as to not discourage others from attempting. Popular Mechanics revealed this secret in a 1935 article, and since then most high striker operators have ceased fixing their units.

== See also ==
- Strength tester machine – a type of amusement personality tester machine, which upon receiving credit rates the subject's strength
