= Twożywo =

Polish street art group

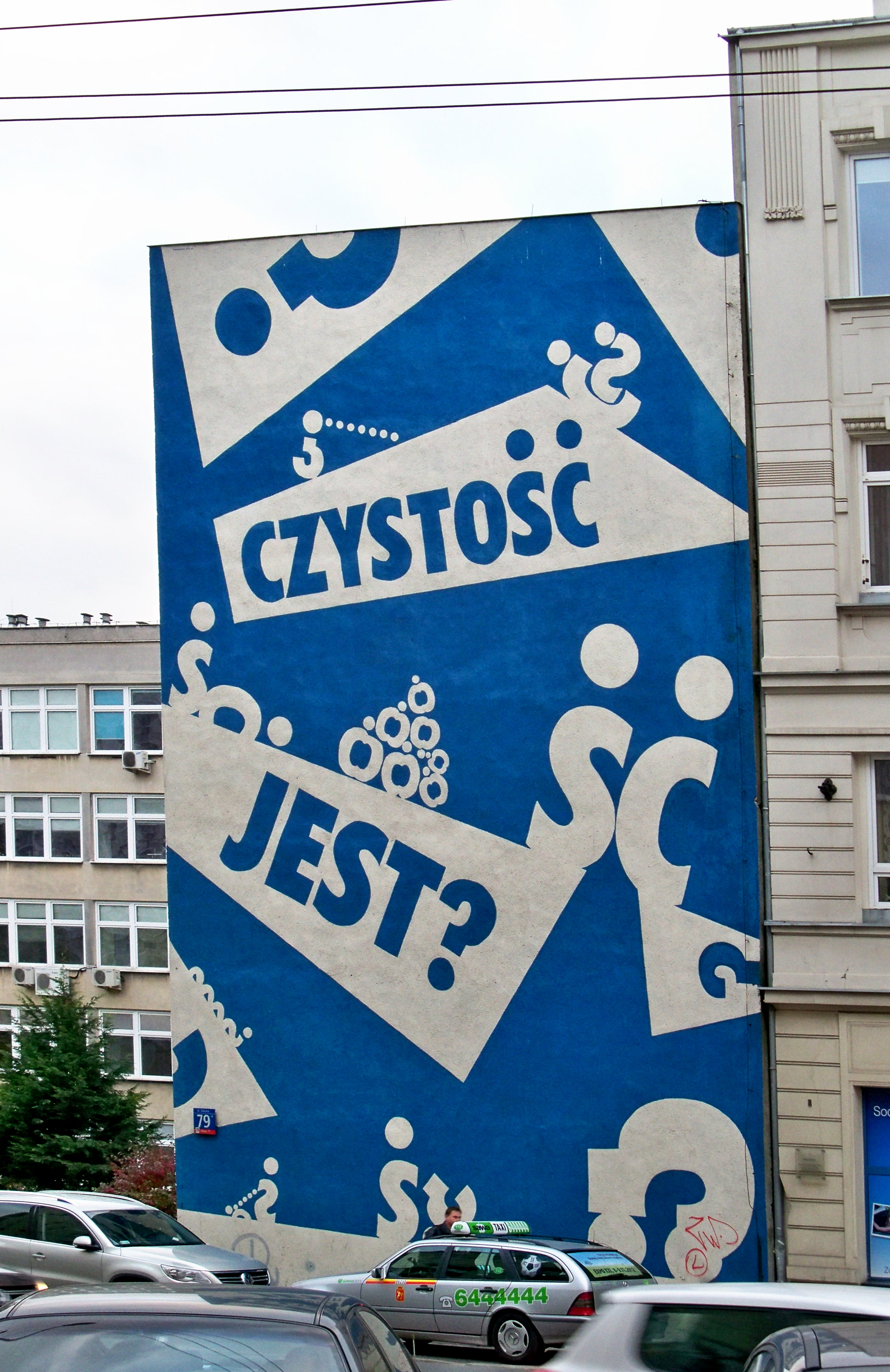
- Twożywo's Czystość jest? mural on a wall in Ochota
- Formation: 1995; 31 years ago
- Founded at: Warsaw
- Dissolved: 2011; 15 years ago
- Type: Graffiti crew
- Location: Warsaw, Poland
- Official language: Polish
- Leader: Krzysztof Sidorek and Mariusz Libel
- Website: twozywo.art.pl

Twożywo was a Polish artistic grouping active in the early 21st century. Formed in Warsaw in 1995 by Krzysztof Sidorek and Mariusz Libel, the group was initially known for their vlepki (sticker art) posted inside Warsaw's city buses. Soon, Twożywo moved to larger forms and became pioneers of street art in Poland. Twożywo's posters, murals, billboards and press illustrations were often inspired by constructivism, pop-art, early 20th century futurism and concrete poetry. In 2006 the group was awarded the prestigious Paszport Polityki award of the Polityka weekly. The group disbanded in 2011.
