= Halina Mastalerz =

Polish politician and factory worker (born 1950)

Member of the Sejm of Poland
- In office 13 October 1985 – 3 June 1989
- Constituency: No. 55

Personal details
- Born: Halina Zielińska; 21 April 1950 (age 76) Kamień Pomorski, Poland
- Party: Independent
- Occupation: Politician, factory worker

Halina Mastalerz (Polish: [xaˈli.na masˈta.lɛʂ]; née Zielińska, Polish: [ʑɛˈliɲ.ska]; born 21 April 1950) is a Polish retired politician and factory worker. From 1985 to 1989, she was a member of the Sejm of Poland, representing the constituency no. 63, centered on the city of Stargard. Mastalerz was an independent politician.

== Biography ==
Halina Mastalerz (née Zielińska) was born on 21 April 1950 in the town of Kamień Pomorski, located in West Pomeranian Voivodeship, Poland. She finished a primary school in the town of Wolin in 1965, and a vocational school of the company Przedsiębiorstwo Połowów Dalekomorskich i Usług Rybackich Odra (lit. 'Odra Deep Sea Fishing and Fishing Services Company') in the city of Świnoujście in 1968. Afterwards, Mastalerz worked for the company in its factory, and in 1971, became a foreman. From 13 October 1985 to 3 June 1989, she was a member of the Sejm of Poland, representing the constituency no. 63, centered on the city of Stargard, in the Sejm of Poland. Mastalerz was an independent politician. In the Sejm, she belonged to the Foreign Economic Cooperation Committee, and the Transport, Shipping and Communications Committee.
