= Tadeusz Zieliński =

Tadeusz Zieliński may refer to:

- Tadeusz J. Zieliński (born 1966), Polish lawyer and Protestant theologian
- Tadeusz Stefan Zieliński (1859–1944), Polish philologist and historian
- Tadeusz Zieliński (athlete) (1946–1977), Polish middle-distance runner
- Thaddeus Zielinski (1916–1990), American bishop
- Tadeusz Zieliński (1926-2003), Polish academic and candidate for President
