= Strength tester machine =

Type of amusement machine

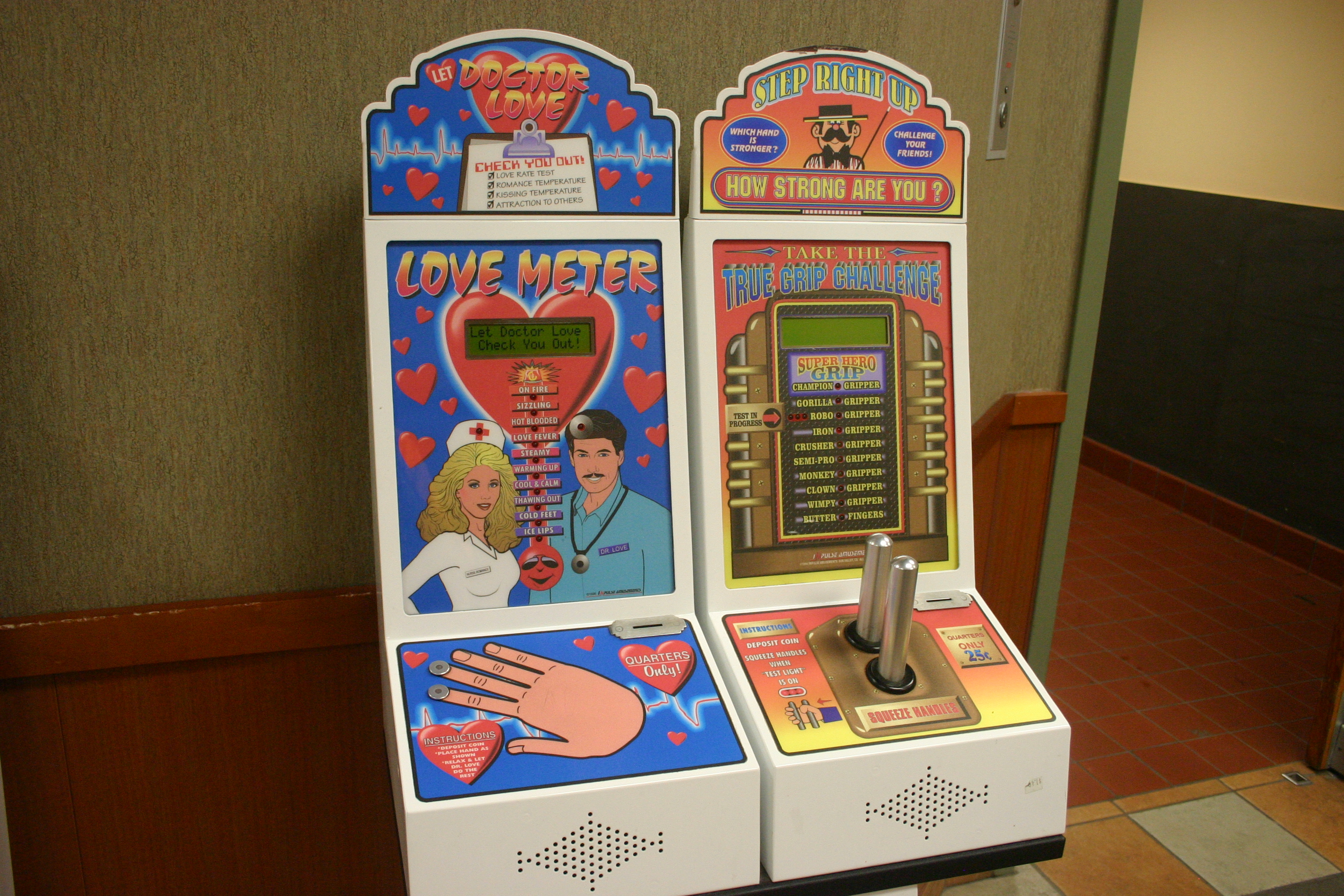
A strength tester machine (right) besides a love tester machine at a Framingham, Massachusetts rest stop

A strength tester machine is a type of amusement machine, which rates the subject's strength, according to how strongly the person presses levers, squeezes a grip or punches a punching bag. Strength testers were originally developed for carnivals, penny arcades and amusement parks during the early 20th-century, but later became popular in bars and family entertainment centers. Modern strength testing machines have become redemption games and use LCDs for a video feedback, while some such as Sega's K.O. Punch (1981) use a video game display for feedback.

== Types ==
The High striker is a traditional carnival game consisting of a tall tower with a rubber target at the bottom and a metal bell at the top. The contestant swings a large mallet at the target to send a puck upwards to ring the bell.

The Punching Bag machine consists of a hanging punching bag connected to a dial marked with strength ratings. The contestant punches the bag so the needle on the dial rates the strength of the punch. Modern versions use digital readouts.

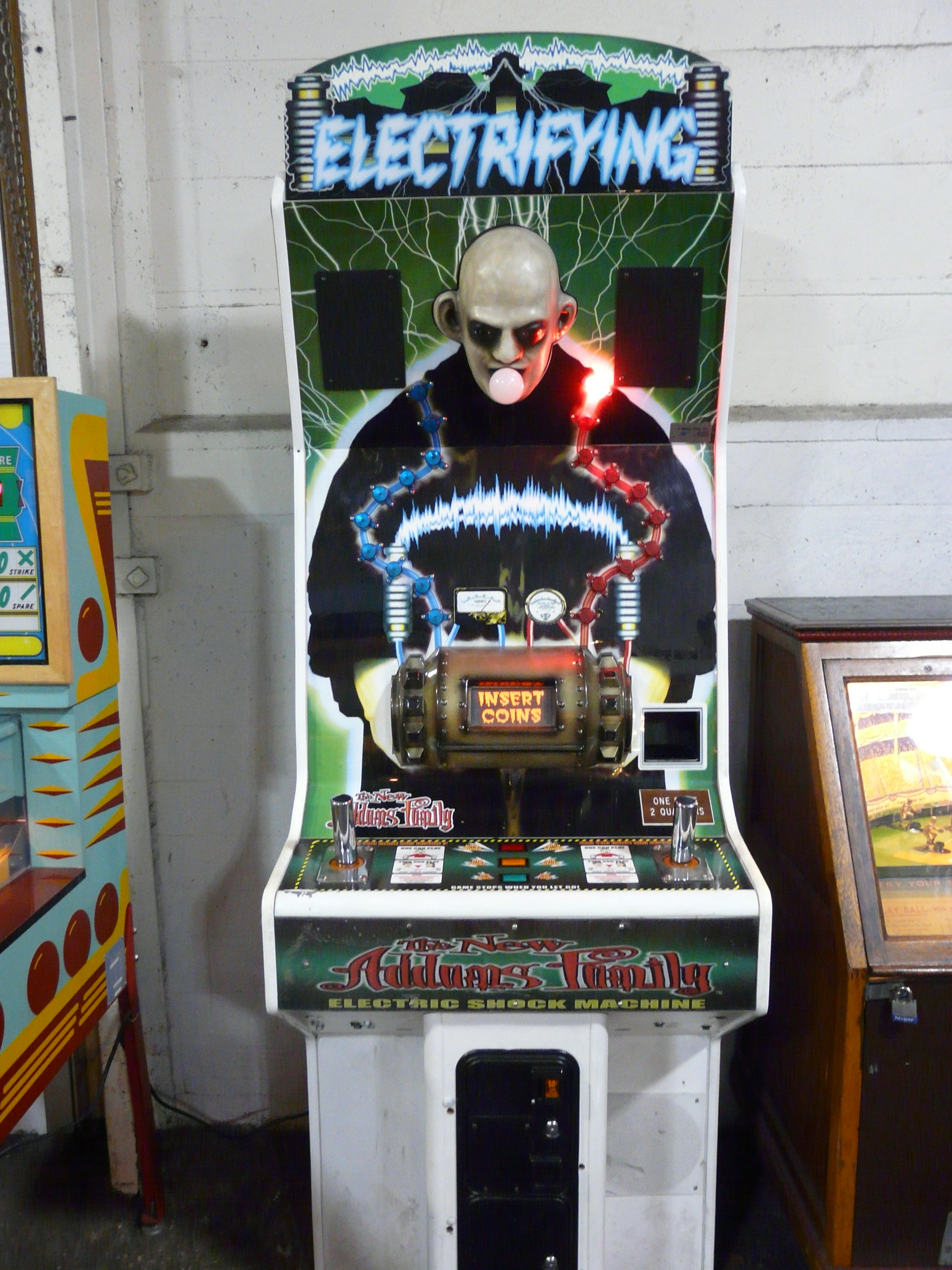
The New Addams Family electric shock machine by Eurocom and Nova Productions at Musée Mécanique that works with vibration

Electric shock strength testers evaluate how long someone can stand unperilous electric shocks. However, most machines in amusement parks today only utilize vibrations that feels somewhat like an electric shock to someone not expecting it.

Personality strength testers are a type of amusement personality tester machines that try to rate the strength of the subject's character. Such machines are for amusement purposes only and do not actually give a real result.

== In media ==
- American Restoration features a restoration of a Punch-A-Bag strength tester machine from 1910 in the 6th episode "Knockout" and of a strength tester that had stood on the Santa Monica Pier in the 17th episode "Grippin' Mad".
- American Pickers features a 1920s Advance Machine Company electric shock strength tester in the 22nd episode "Laurel and Hardy".

== Gallery ==
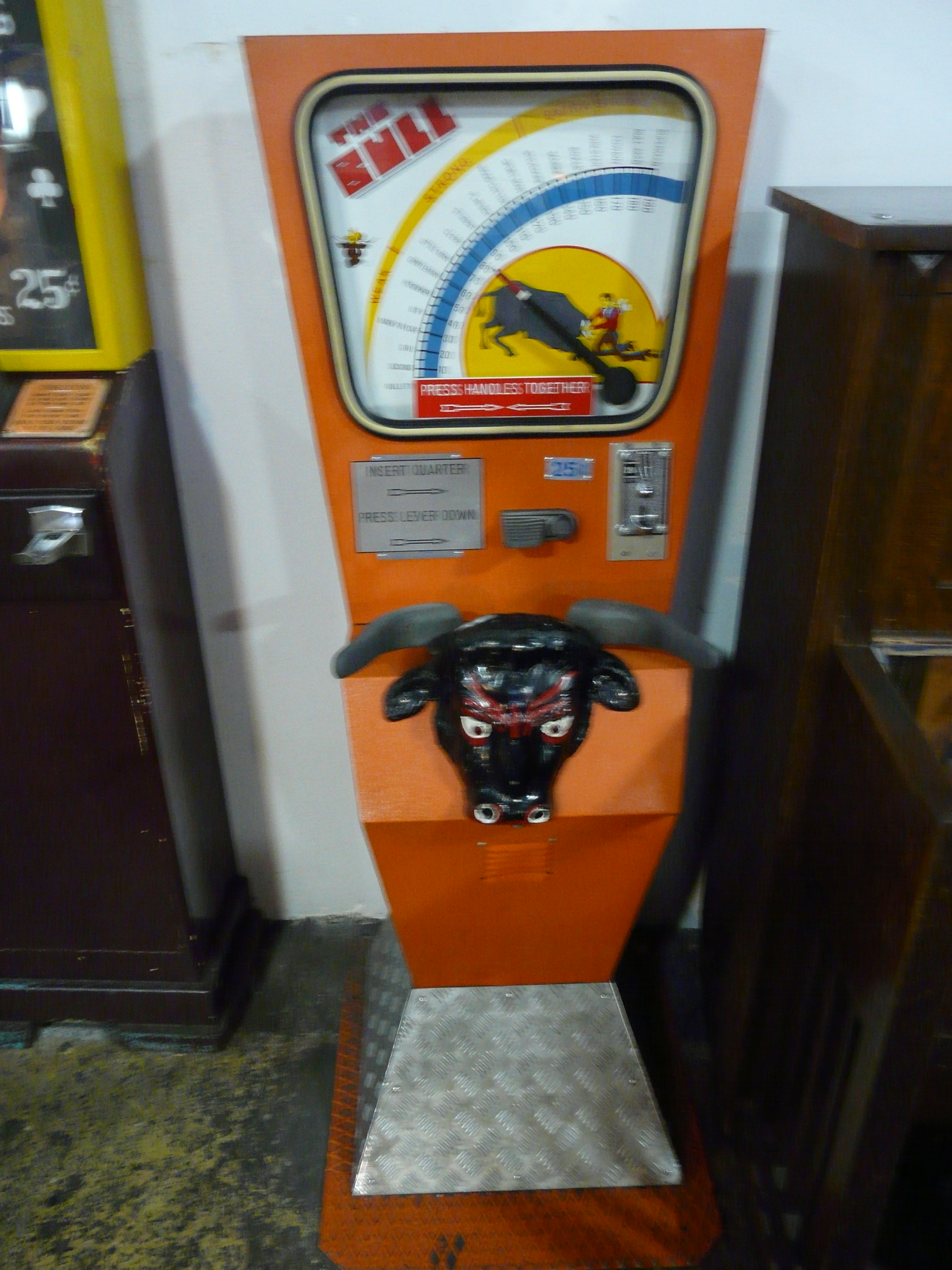

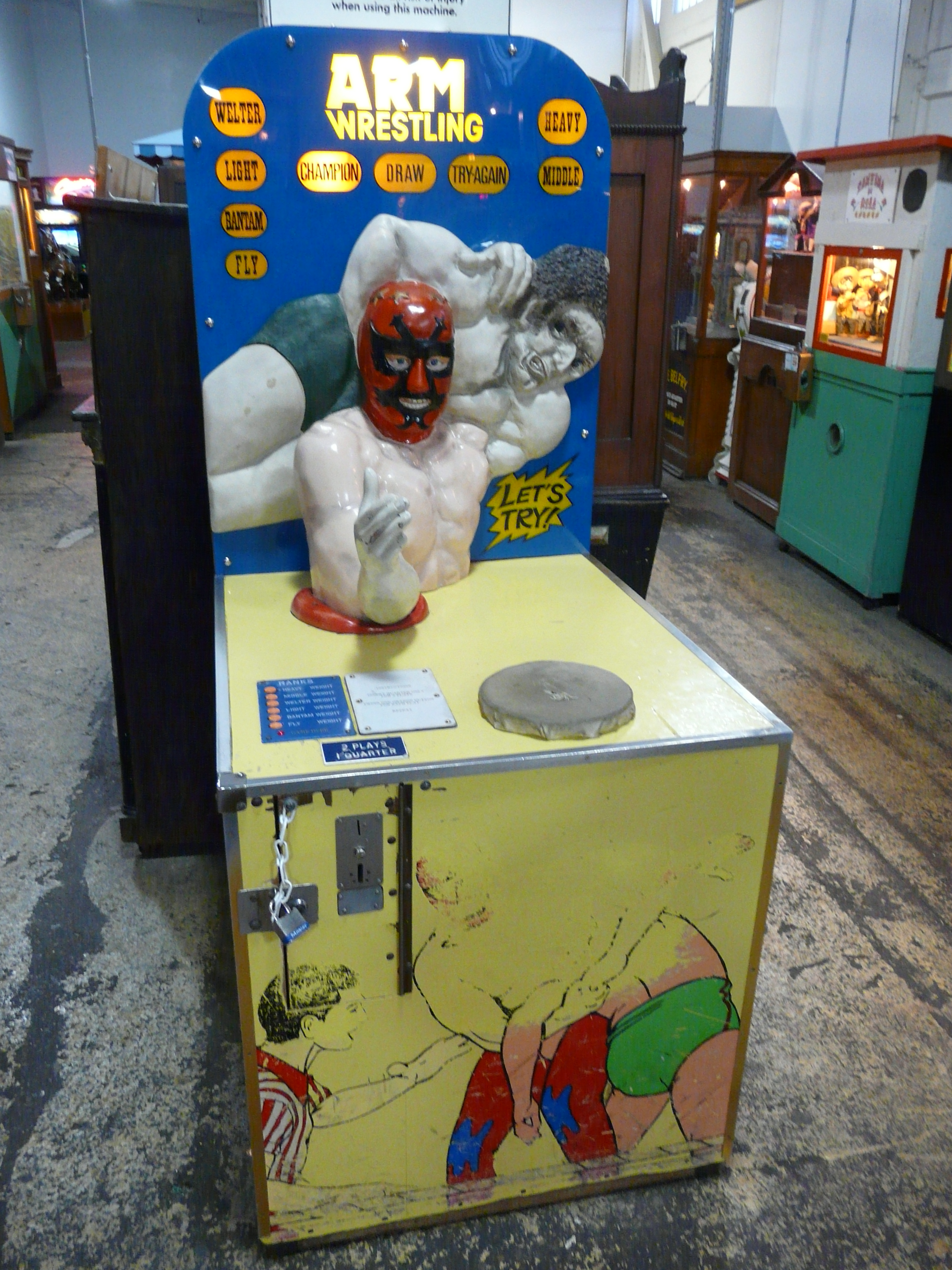

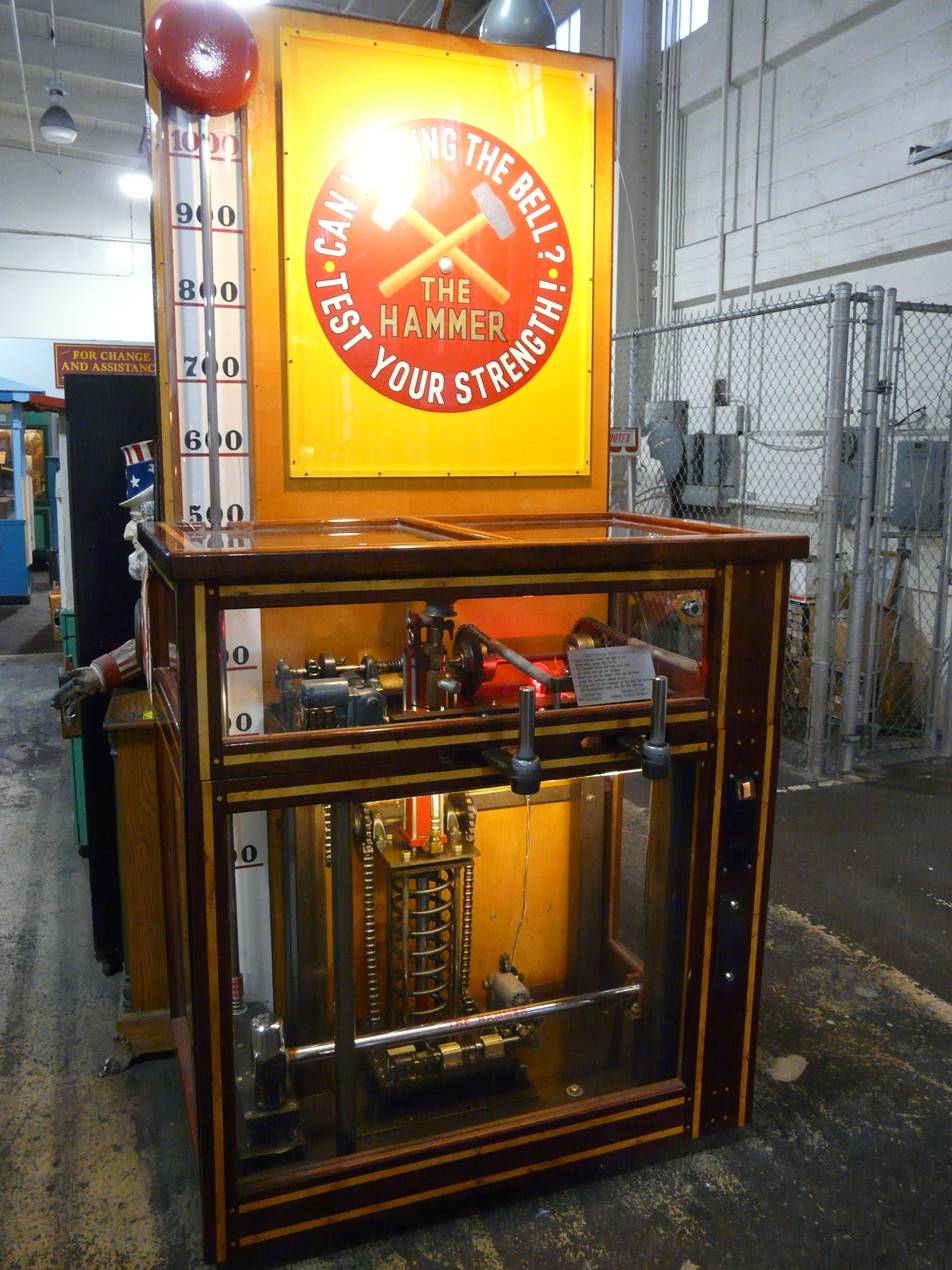

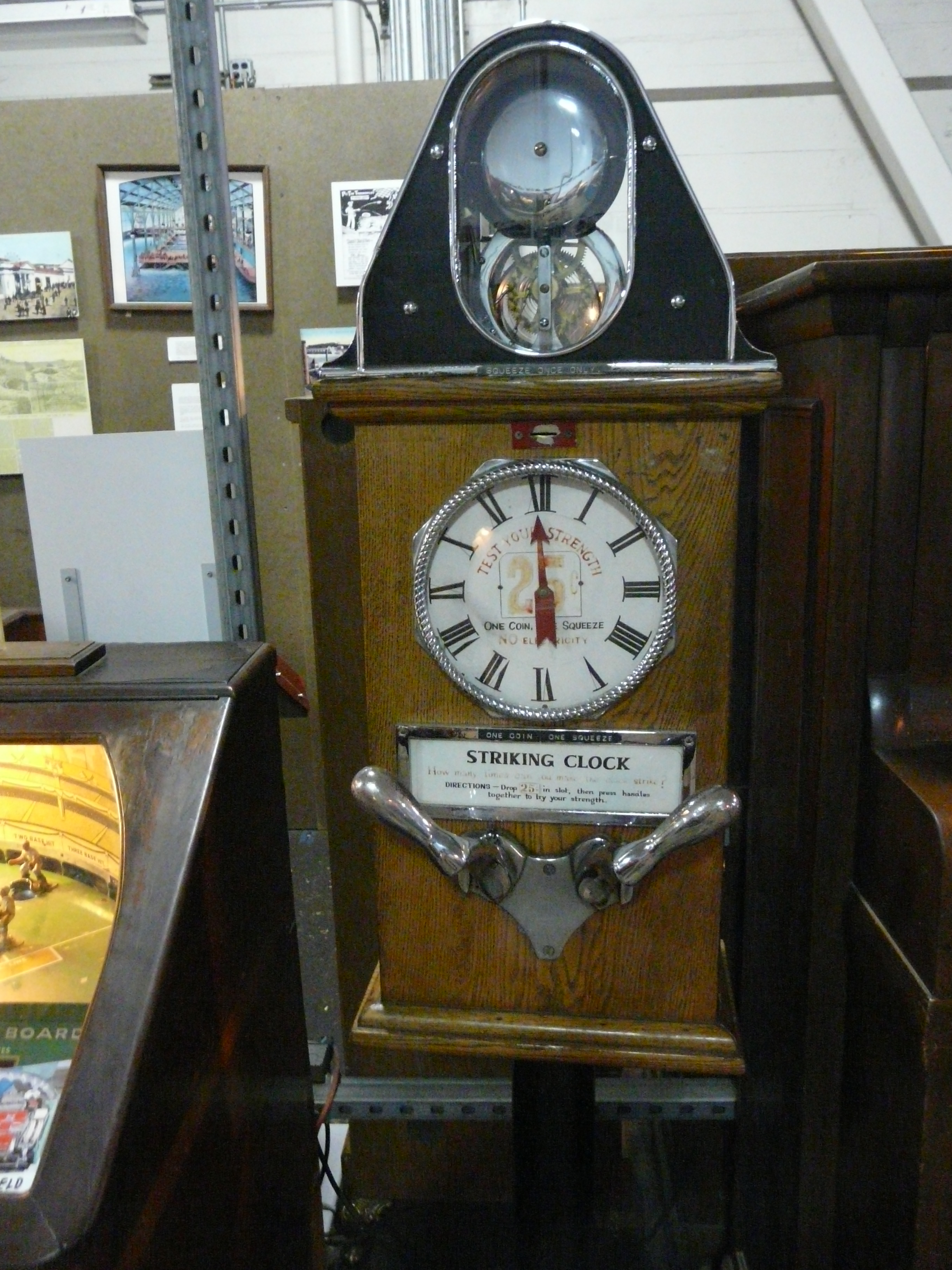

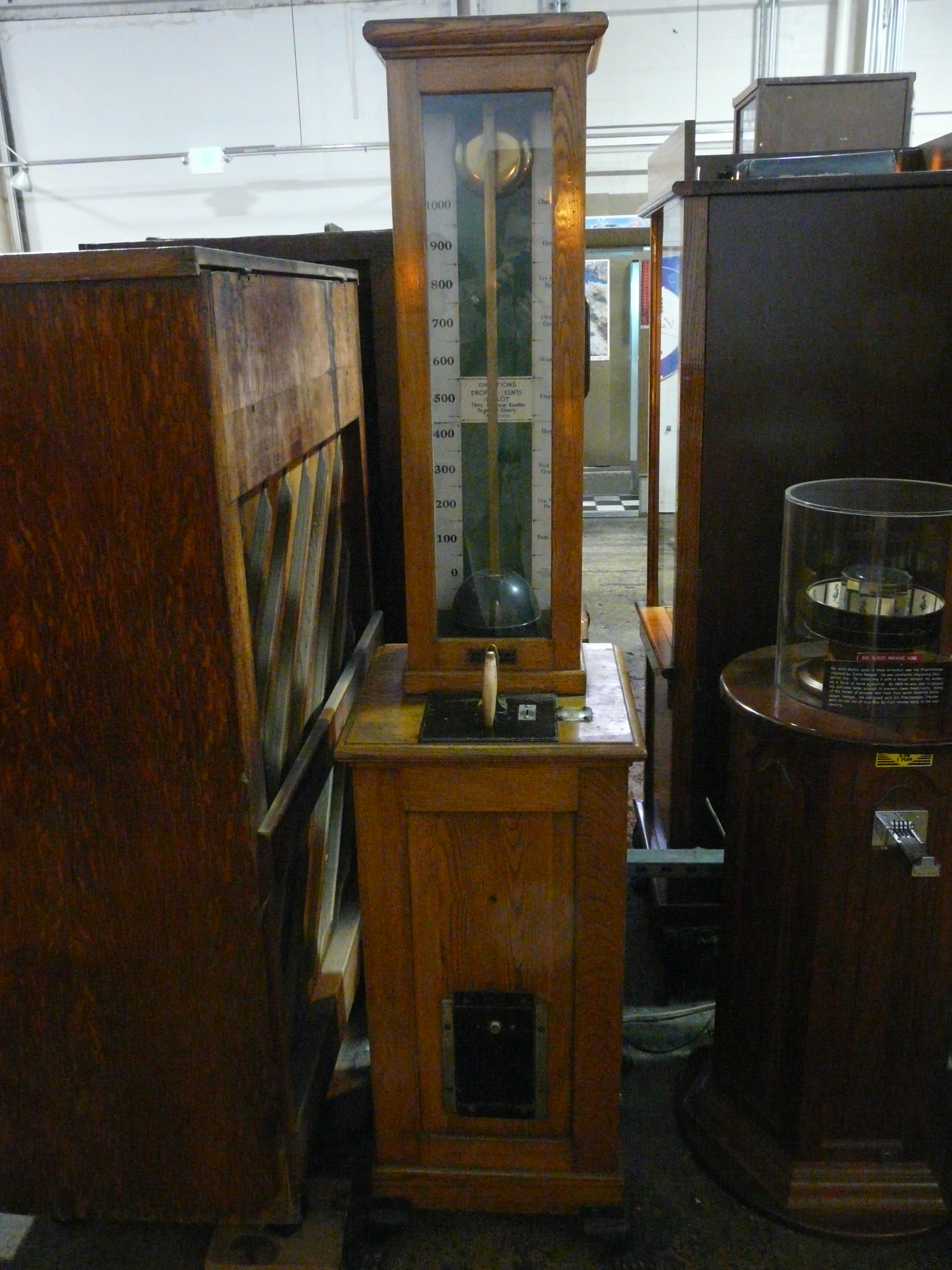

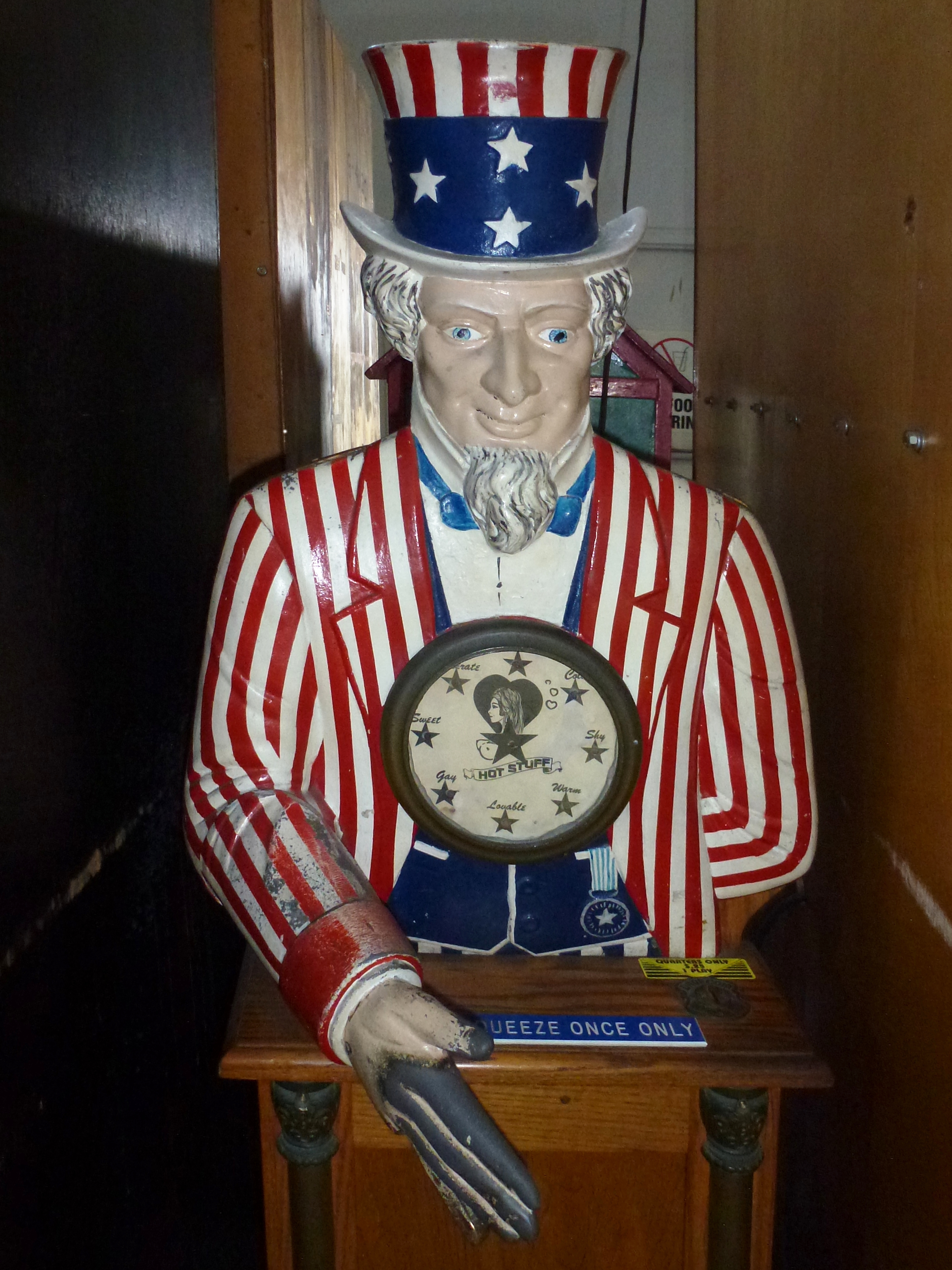
A personality strength tester

== See also ==
- Fortune teller machine
- Love tester machine
