= Andrzej Zieliński (artist) =

American painter

- Andrzej Zieliński, Turquesa Shredder, 2009, Mixed Media on Wood Panel, 48 x 48 x 3"
- Born: 1976 (age 49–50); Kansas City, Missouri, US
- Education: 2004, MFA, Yale University, New Haven, CT; 2002, BFA, The School of the Art Institute of Chicago, Chicago, IL
- Known for: Painting, Sculpture, Drawing, Printmaking
- Awards: 2009, Charlotte Street Fund Award; 2004, Alice Kimball English Travel Fellowship; 2002, Art Institute of Chicago Graduation BFA Fellowship

Andrzej Zieliński (born 1976, Kansas City, Missouri, USA) is an American painter.

== Education ==
Zieliński received his BFA from The School of the Art Institute of Chicago in 2002. In 2004 he earned his MFA from Yale University in New Haven, CT.

== Works ==
Zieliński's main body of work reflects on electronic devices that saturate our lives: cell phones, ATMs, computers, and paper shredders. Zieliński's paintings are mixed media, which includes a variety of materials. The paintings are textured and have sculptural depth.. Often, he begins by painting wide strokes of interference paint which include titanium-coated mica flakes and change color depending upon the angle they are viewed from. Then, he outlines shapes painted thinly in acrylic with chalk or crayon and more paint. The result adds a third dimension to the traditional two-dimensional canvas.

Zieliński entered Yale with a background in information theory and his artwork then consisted of conceptual collage grids made from cloth. Over the next few years at Yale his work transformed from orderly black and white collages into intense bright paintings of everyday objects, including laptops. These works were humorous in their presentation. The lines were crooked, perspectives were tilted, and the colors were absurdly bright and reminiscent of Fauvist canvases.

Zieliński's next interest became ATM, paper shredders, and cell phones. He focused on how these machines hide their complexities behind simple exteriors.

Zieliński makes painting relatable to the 21st century viewer with his subject matter. The cell phone has become a vital part of life in the current era. Zieliński's paintings capture the deceptive simplicity of the technology that is so essential to our lives.

== Public Collections ==
- Portland Art Museum, Portland, Oregon
- Kansas State University, Marianna Kistler Beach Museum of Art
- Canberra Museum and Gallery, Canberra, ACT, Australia
- National Gallery of Australia (archived Lithographs from Megalo)
- Nerman Museum of Contemporary Art, Overland Park, KS
- Johnson County Community College School Collection, Overland Park, KS
- Daum Museum of Contemporary Art, Sedalia, MO

== Awards ==
- Charlotte Street Foundation Award, Kansas City, MO

== Solo exhibitions ==
- DCKT Contemporary, New York, NY
- Motus Fort, Tokyo, Japan
- Dolphin Gallery, Kansas City, MO
- Nicole Klagsbrun Gallery, New York, NY
- Marc Selwyn Fine Art, Los Angeles, CA

== Group exhibitions ==
- Present - Selected Acquisitions, Nerman Museum of Contemporary Art, Overland Park, KS
- Charlotte Street Foundation Fellows– 2009, Kansas City Art Institute, Kansas City, MO
- Possessed: Representations of Single Objects, Dorsky Gallery Curatorial Programs, Long Island City, NY
- Greater New York, P.S.1 Contemporary Art Center, Long Island City, NY
