= Musée Mécanique =

20th-century mechanical machines museum in San Francisco

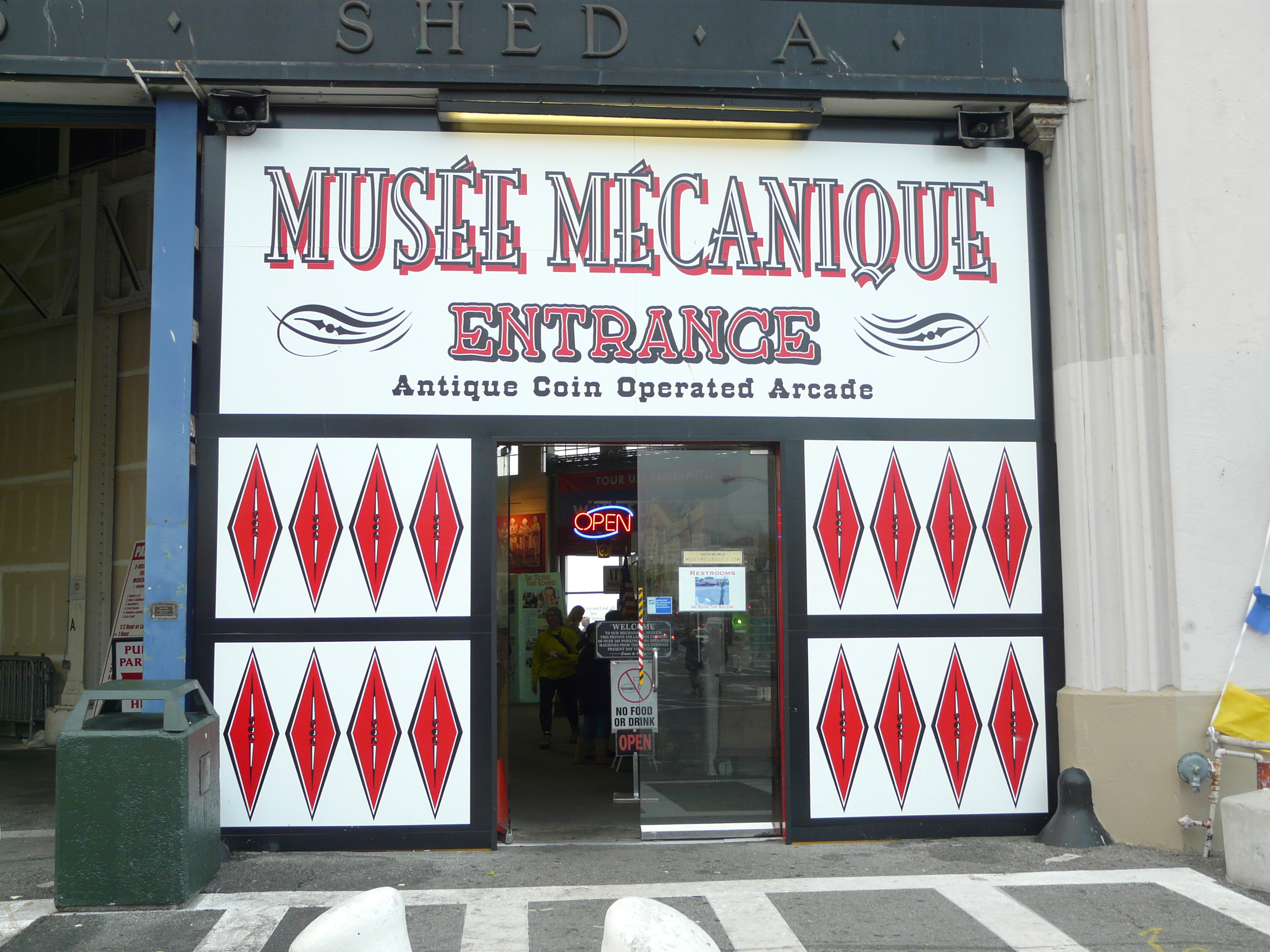
- Entrance to the Musée Mécanique at Pier 45, Shed A

- Musée Mécanique Musée Mécanique (California) Musée Mécanique (the United States)
- Location: San Francisco, California
- Coordinates: 37.8093°N 122.4161°W
- Visitors: 100,000+ (2002)
- Director: Dan Zelinsky
- Public transit access: Jefferson & Taylor
- Website: museemecanique.com

The Musée Mécanique ([my.ze me.ka.nik], "Mechanical Museum") is a for-profit interactive museum of 20th-century penny arcade games and artifacts, located at Fisherman's Wharf in San Francisco, California. With over 300 mechanical machines, it is one of the world's largest privately owned collections.

== History ==
The museum's original owner, Ed Zelinsky, began collecting at age 11. After his house, the machines found a home in Tiburon under The Dock restaurant. Playland ran from 1928-1972, and was home to many of the games under the name Musée Mécanique. In 1972, the land became a part of the Golden Gate National Recreation Area. The museum moved into the basement of Cliff House in 1972, just a few blocks north and across the Great Highway from the Playland site. Zelinsky's son, Dan Zelinsky, took a temporary job in the 1970s maintaining the collection.

The museum was featured in the 2001 film The Princess Diaries and in a 2011 episode of the Japanese television show GameCenter CX.

=== Move to Fisherman's Wharf ===
In 2002, when renovations to the Cliff House had begun, the National Park Service announced plans to relocate the Musée Mécanique temporarily to Fisherman's Wharf. A portion of the $14 million renovation was devoted to moving the museum, with support from the National Park Service, the Golden Gate National Recreation Area, and museum owner Ed Zelinsky.

The museum's move sparked protests by San Francisco locals. An online petition was created opposing it, with over 12,000 signatures. Many of the protesters believed that the money was unavailable to fund the move and renovations, and many had strong feelings about the museum's historical and nostalgic significance from its history at Playland. Unaware of the museum's for-profit status, many of them attempted to donate to the museum to keep it at its current location. Despite public frustration, museum manager Dan Zelinsky remained excited about the move, understanding the historical and emotional connections locals held for the museum: "You have to understand that people grew up with these kind of machines... To the generation before, these were the video games. Many visitors haven't been here since childhood, but when they walk through that door, they are going back in time." Original plans were slated to have the museum return to the Recreation Area in 2004/5 on completion of construction, but the museum remains at Fisherman's Wharf. Despite the locals' love for the original location, National Public Radio described it as "cramped, noisy, damp and a little dingy."

=== Musée Mécanique today ===
The Musée Mécanique is a for-profit museum owned and managed by Dan Zelinsky. The machines require constant maintenance, and some have undergone major restorations. More than 100,000 visitors a year visit the museum. Admittance is free, but visitors must pay to use each game. In 2011 U.S. News & World Report called the Musée Mécanique one of the top three "Things to Do in San Francisco". SF Weekly called it the "Best Old-School Arcade" for 2011.

The collection was threatened on May 23, 2020, when a fire broke out at four A.M. on Fisherman's Wharf. It destroyed a warehouse, but was extinguished before it reached the museum.

== Collection ==
The museum has a collection of over 300 mechanical games and amusement devices including music boxes, coin-operated fortune tellers, Mutoscopes, video games, love testers, player pianos, peep shows, photo booths, dioramas, and pinball machines. It displays about 200 of them at their current location.

The museum has many rare and historical pieces. The oldest is a Praxinoscope, built in 1884. A large diorama of a traveling carnival with a Ferris wheel and other rides occupies its center. It also owns what is believed to be the only steam-powered motorcycle in the world, built in Sacramento, in 1912. The Royal Court diorama features couples ballroom dancing and was featured in the Panama–Pacific International Exposition. Laffing Sal, which has been described as "famously creepy", is a 6-foot-tall laughing automaton. The museum also owns a collection of machines made of toothpicks by prisoners at San Quentin.

== Gallery ==
Wurlitzer Style B Orchestrion

Cactus Gulch

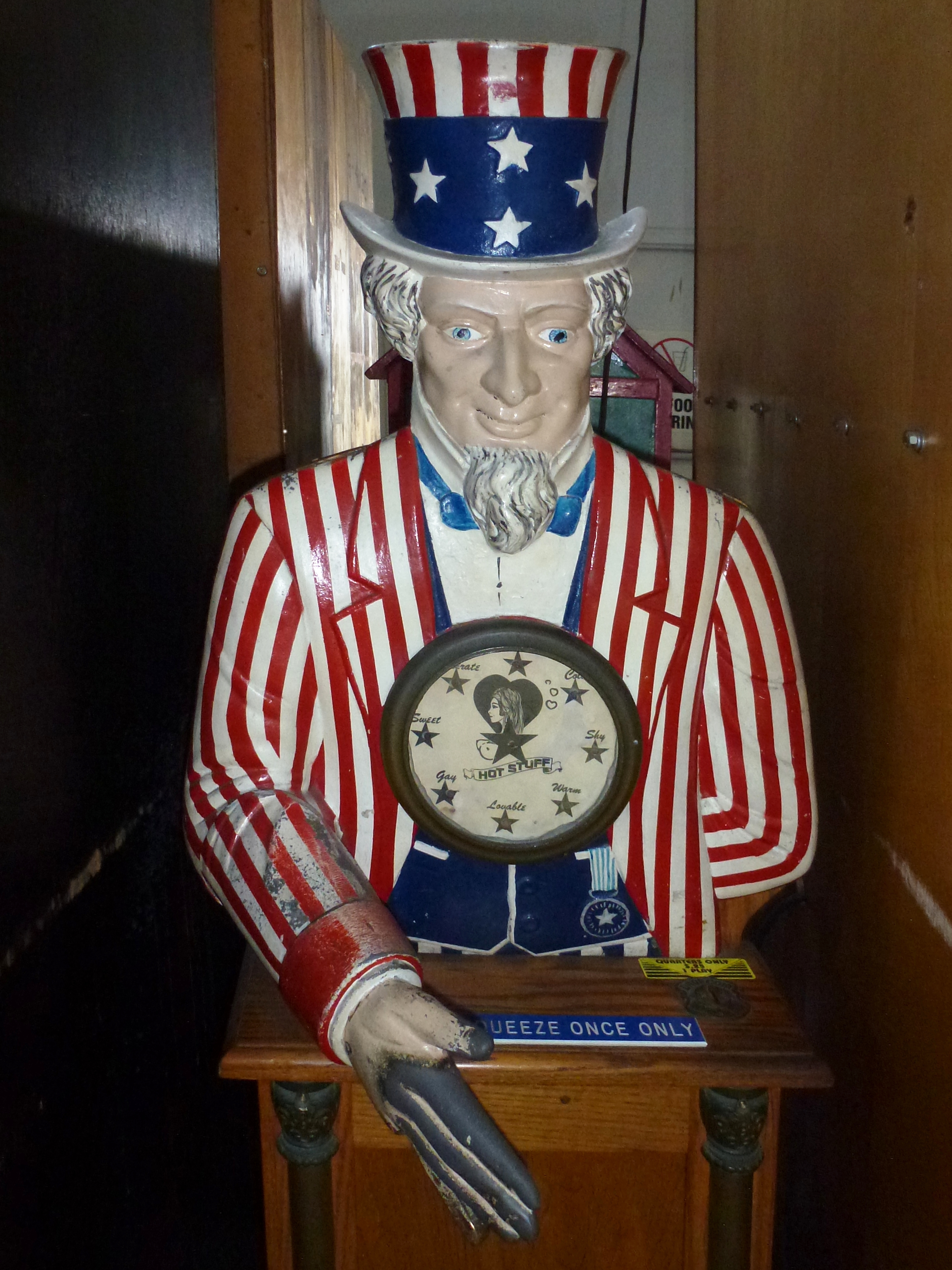
Uncle Sam carnival game....Hot Stuff meter

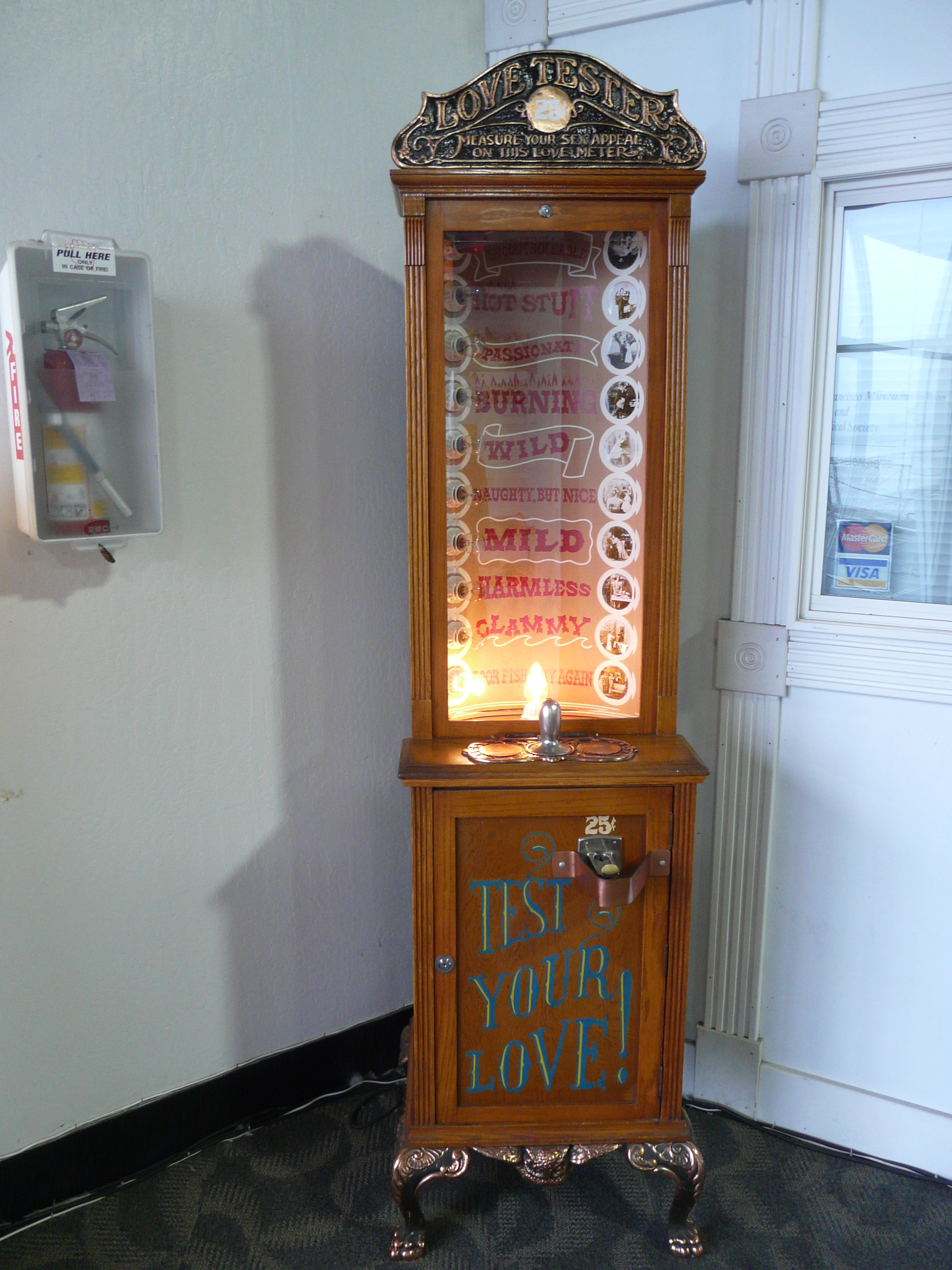
Love tester machine

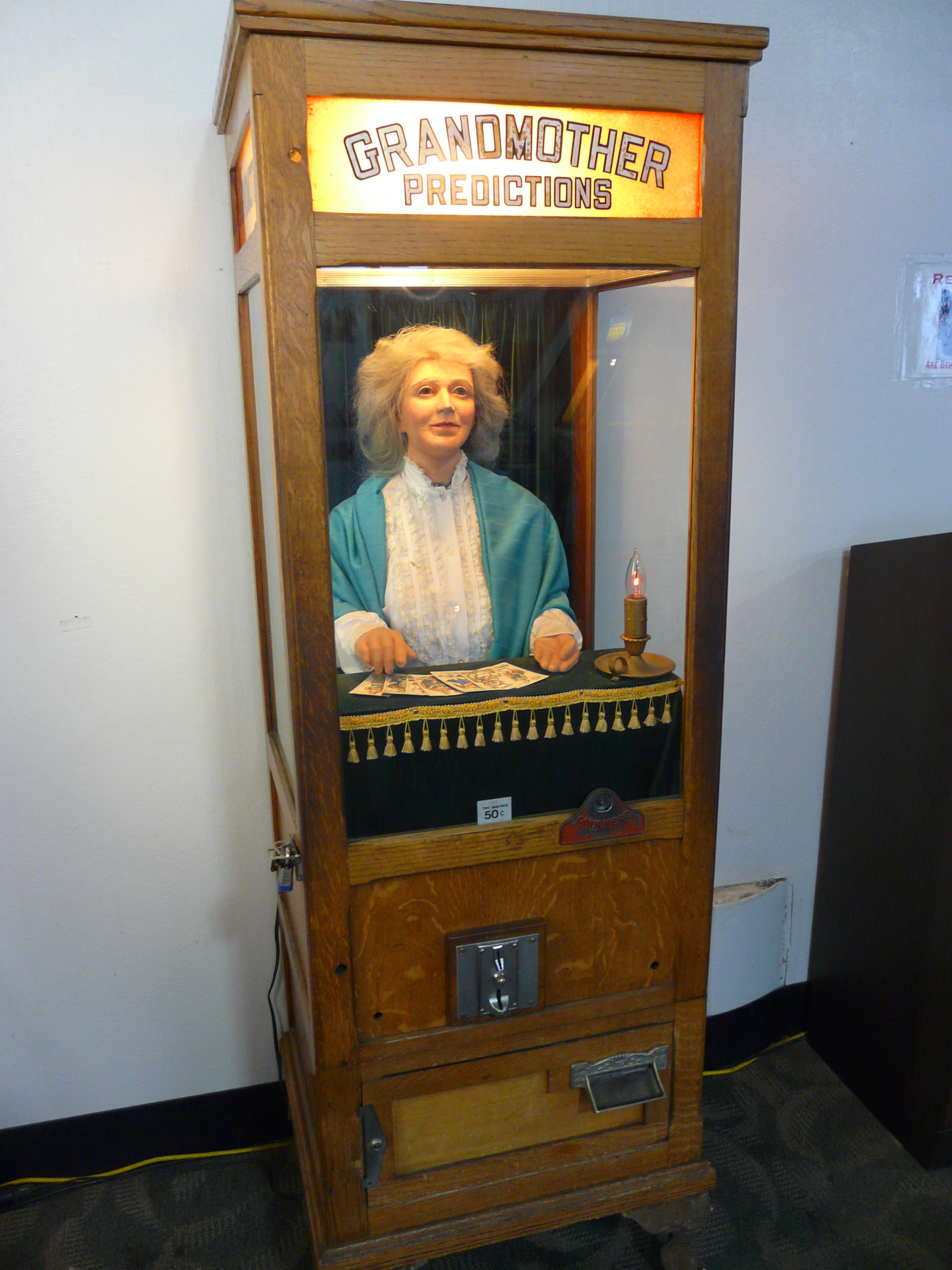
Grandmother fortune teller machine

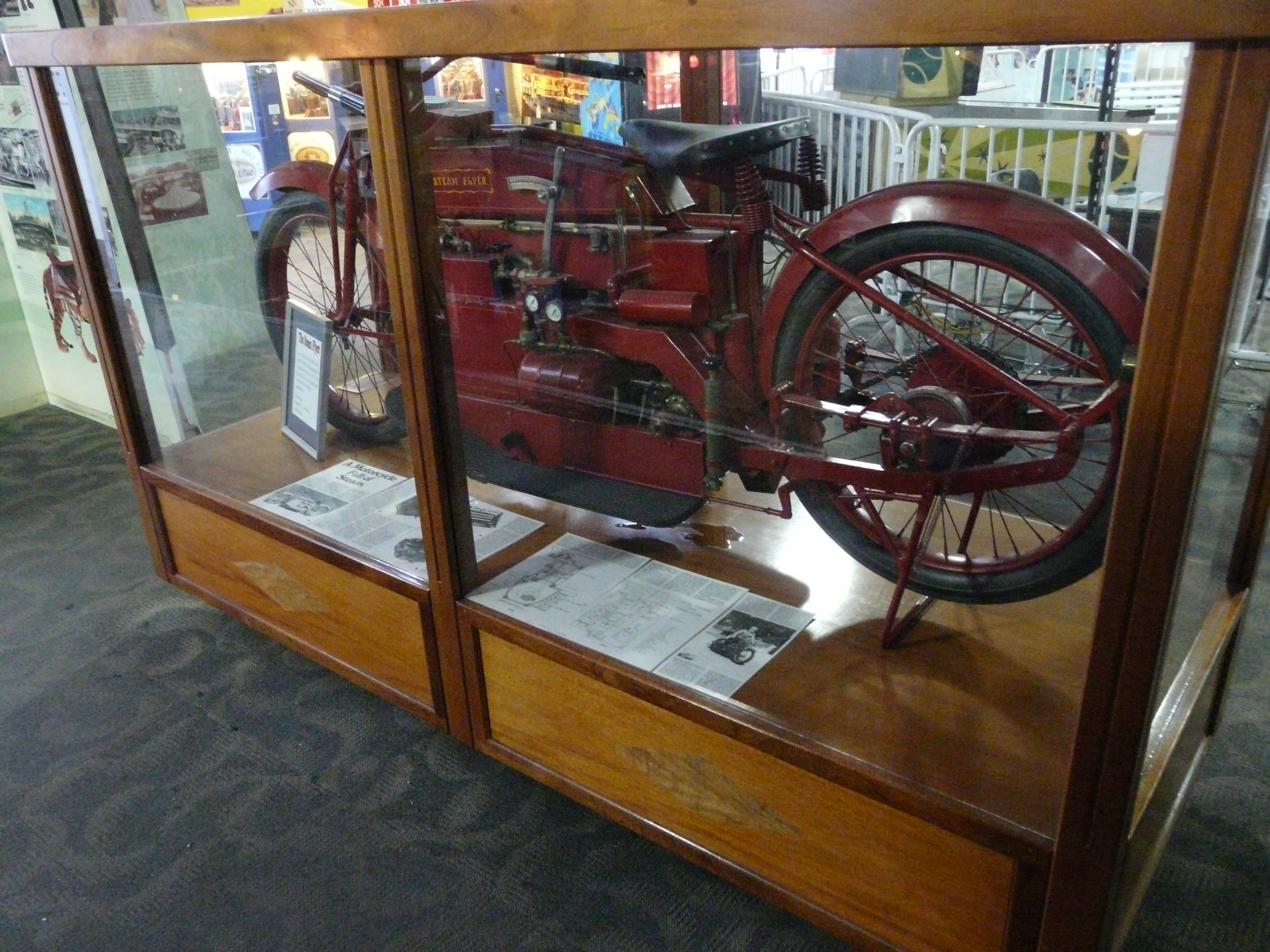
Steam-powered motorcycle

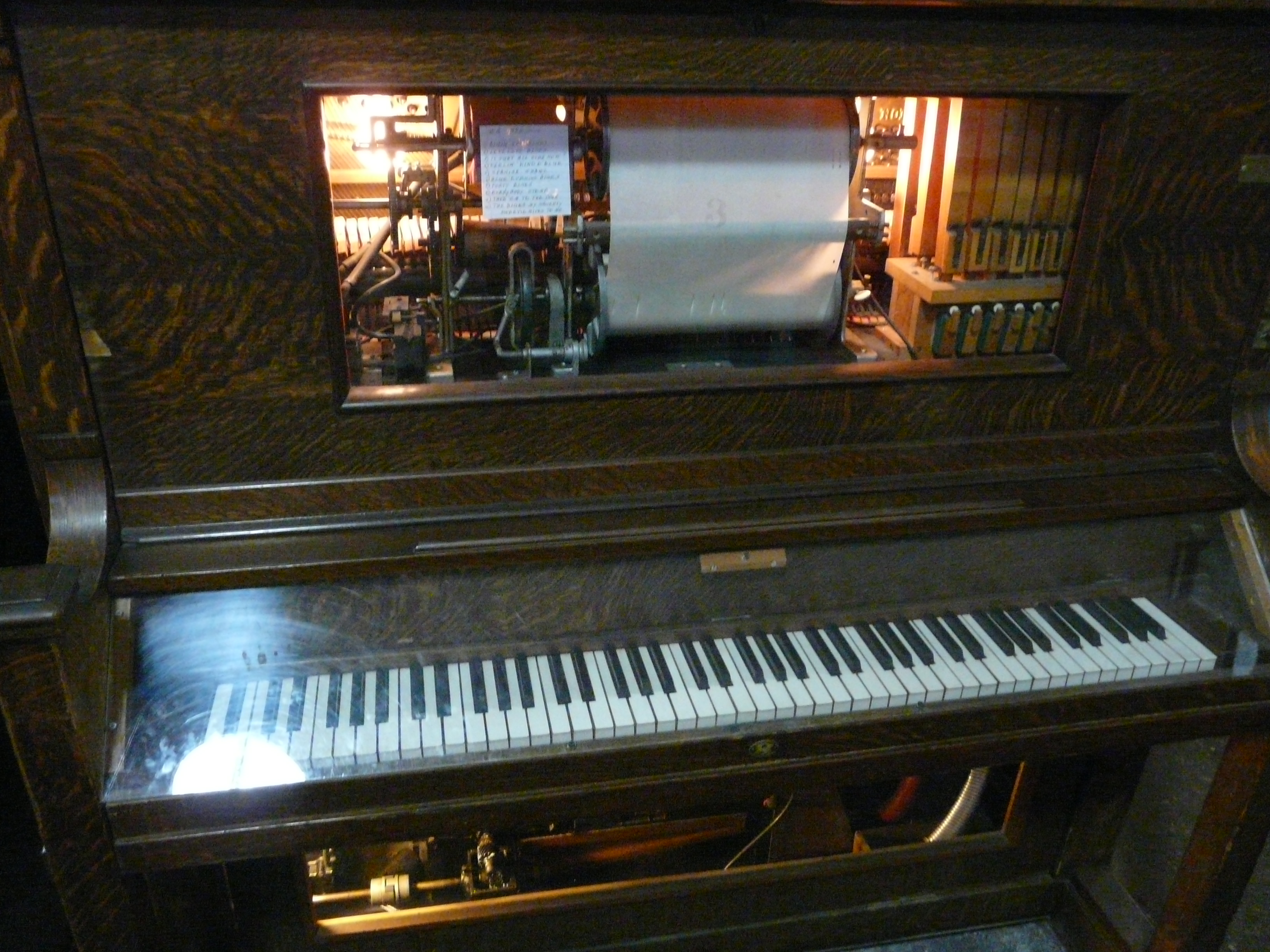
Player piano

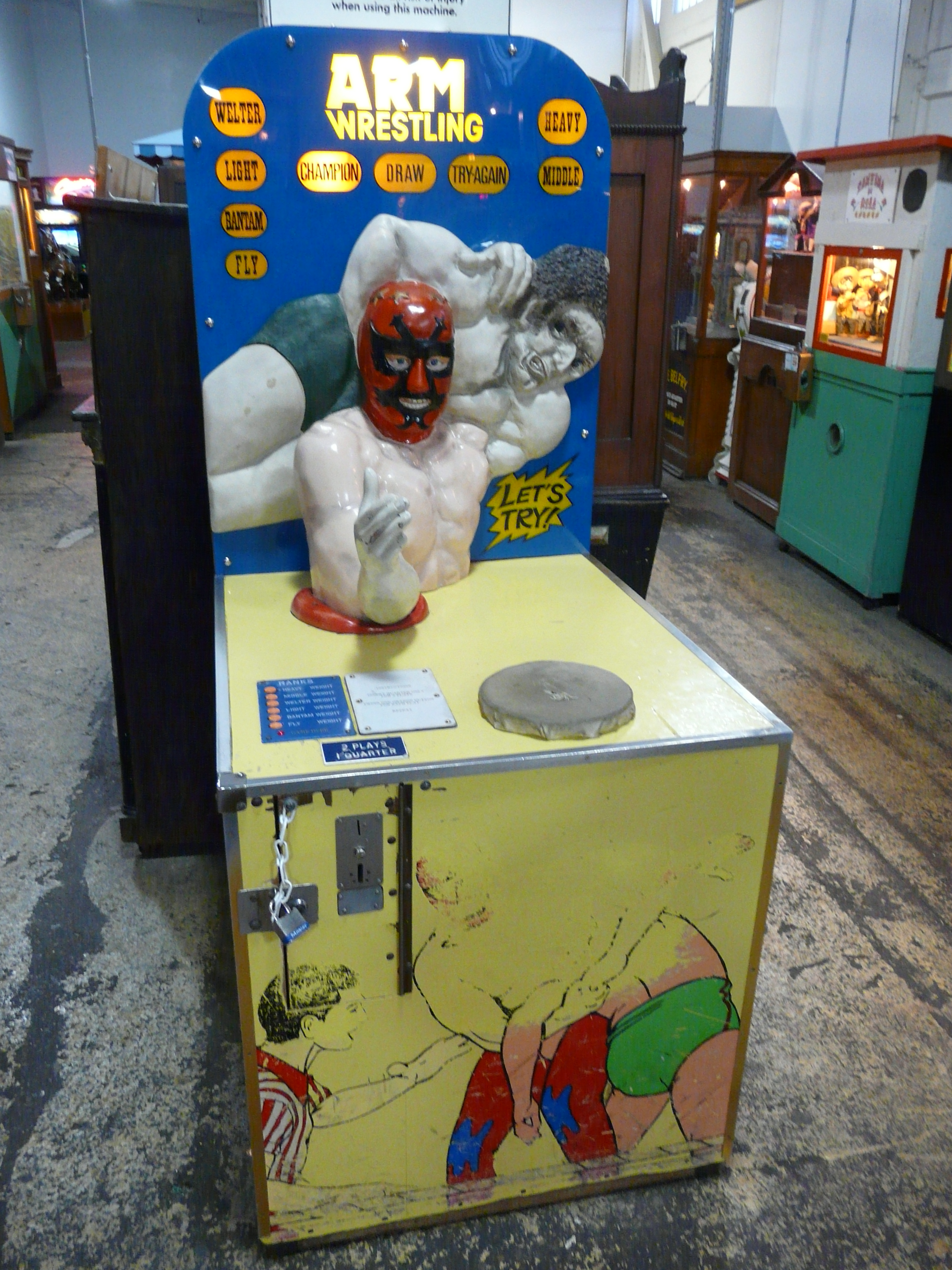
Arm wrestler

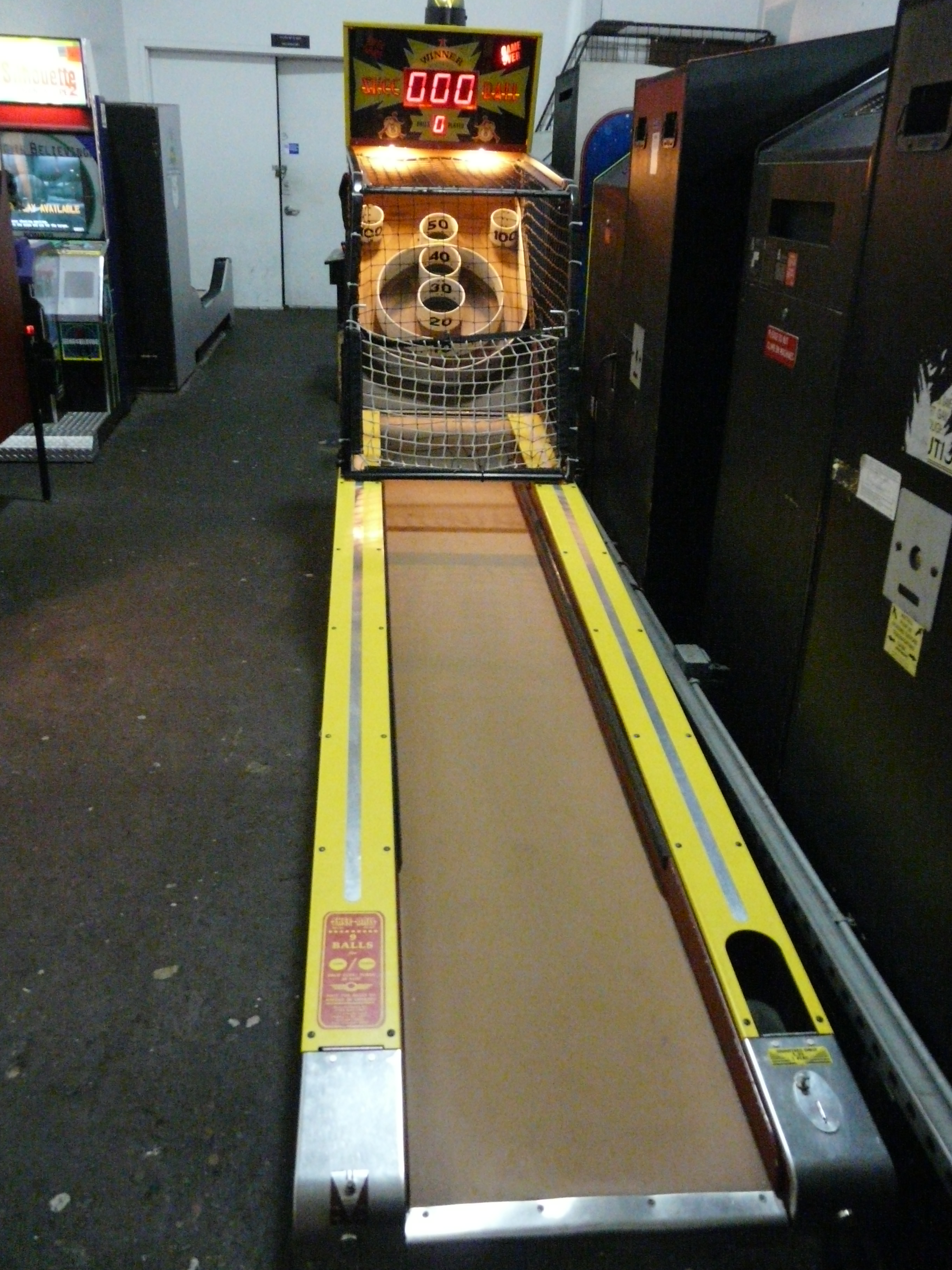
Skeeball

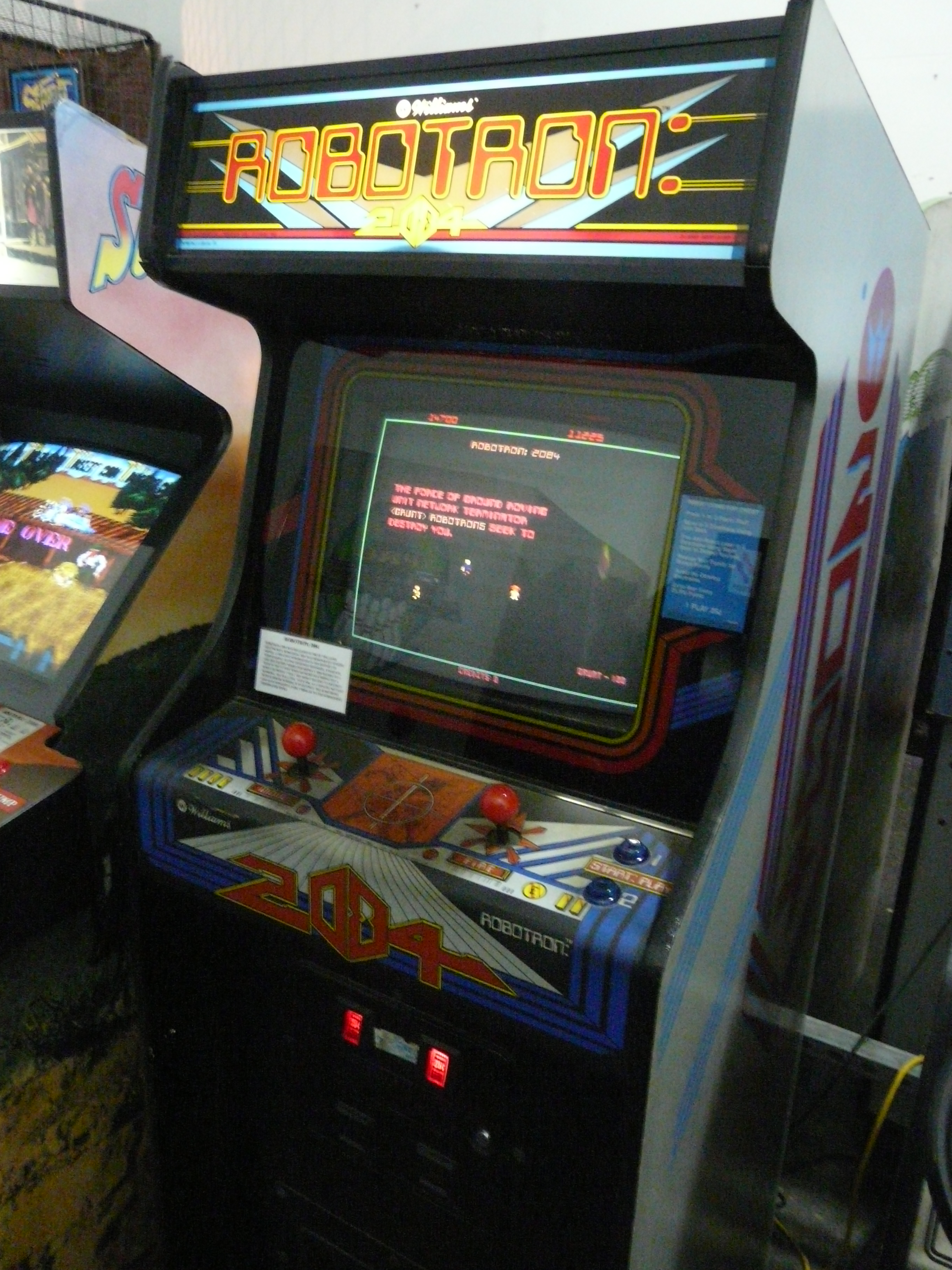
Robotron: 2084 video game

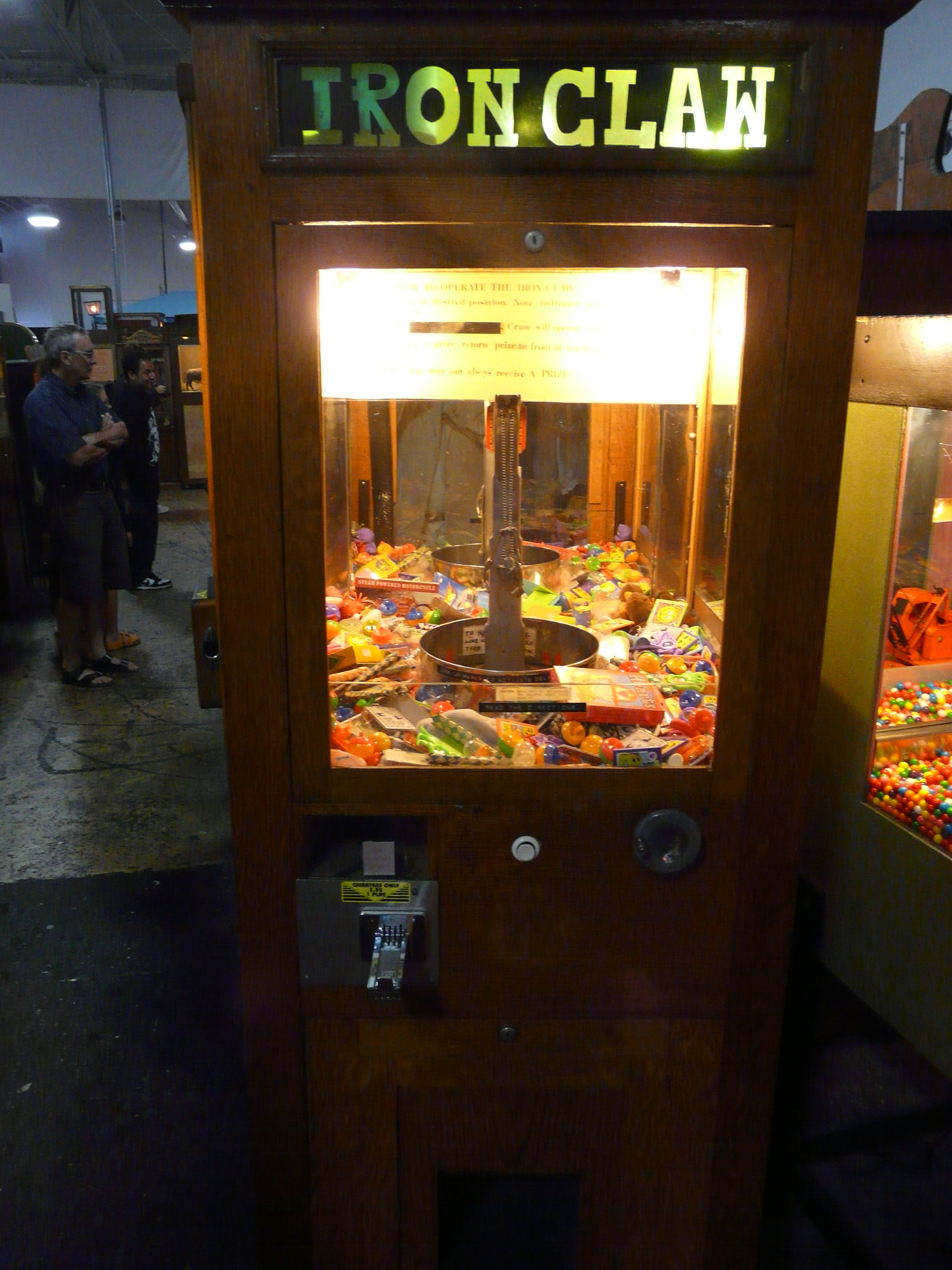
Claw game

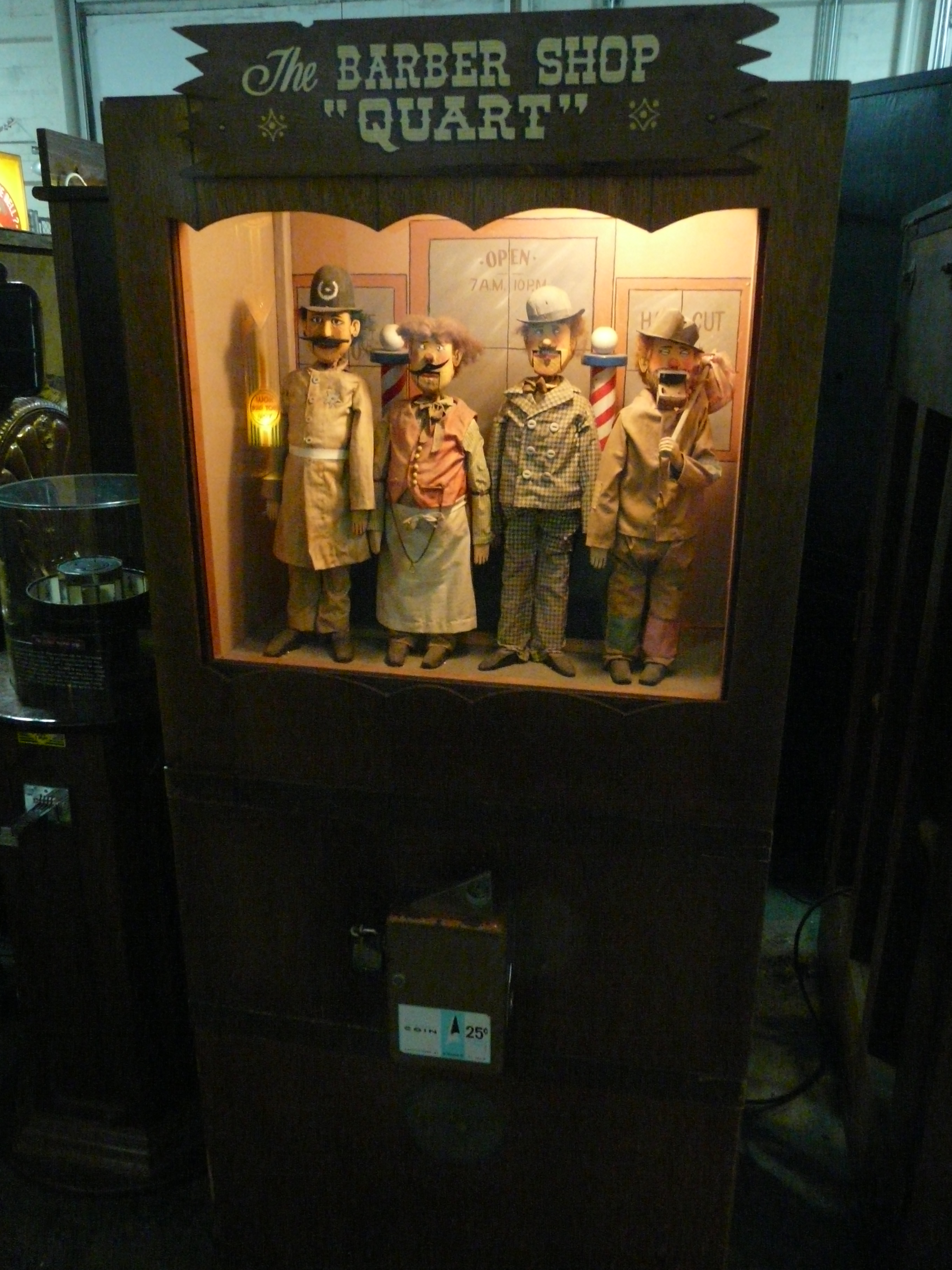
The Barber Shop "Quart"

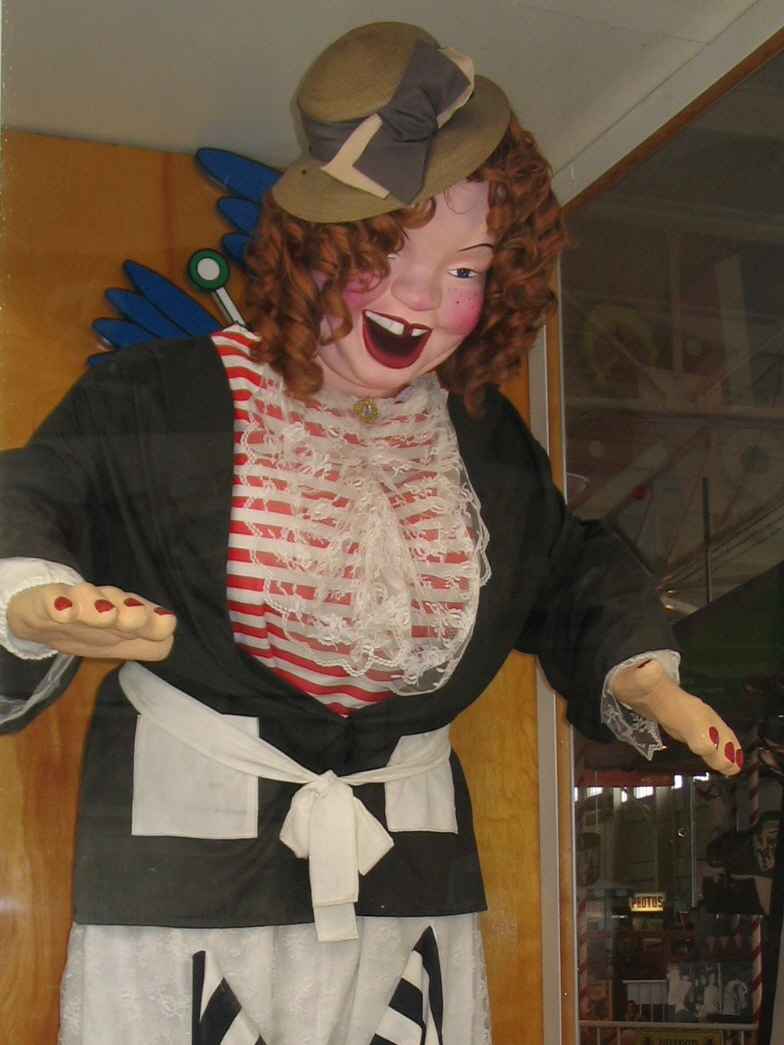
Laffing Sal

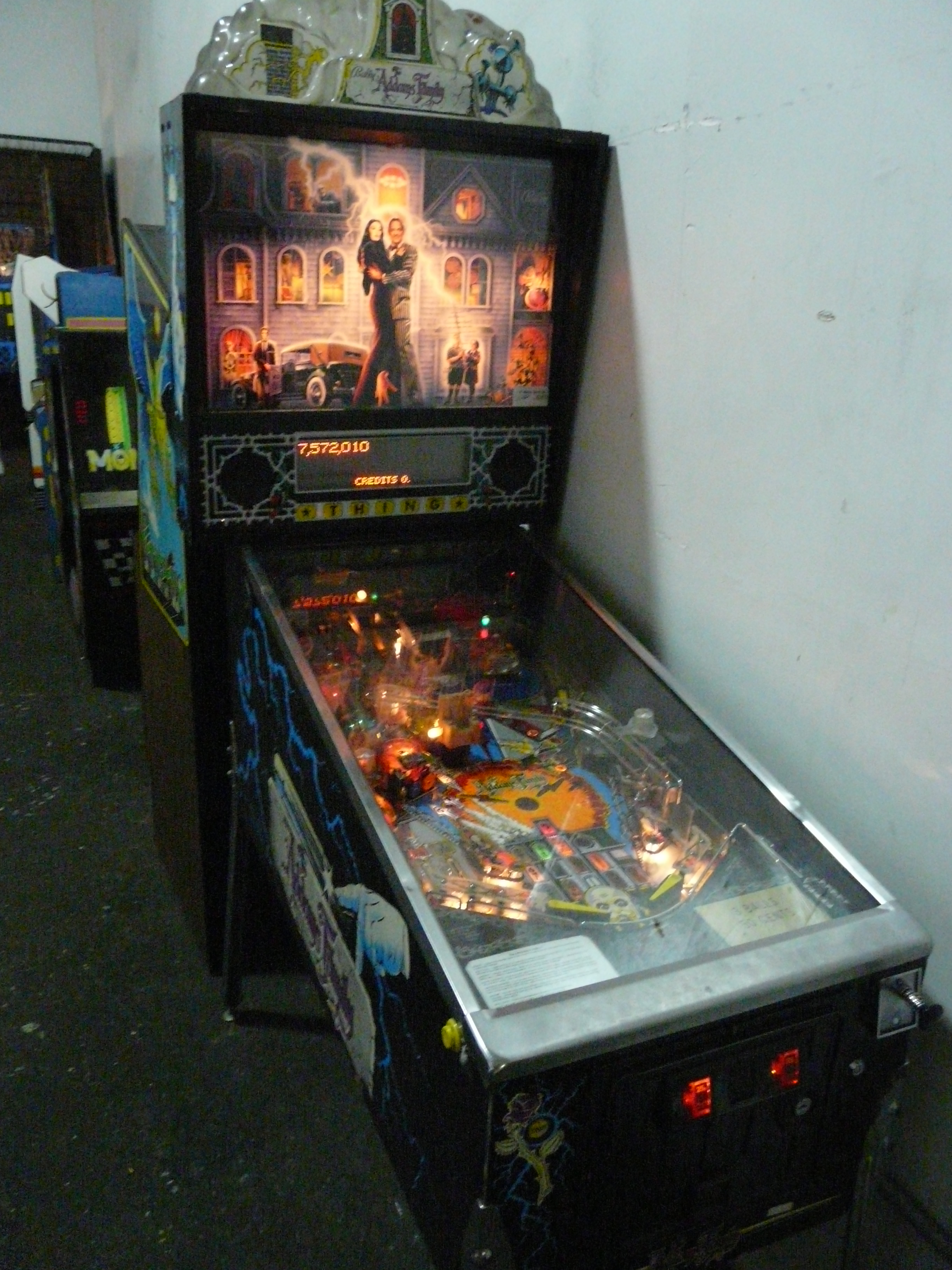
The Addams Family pinball

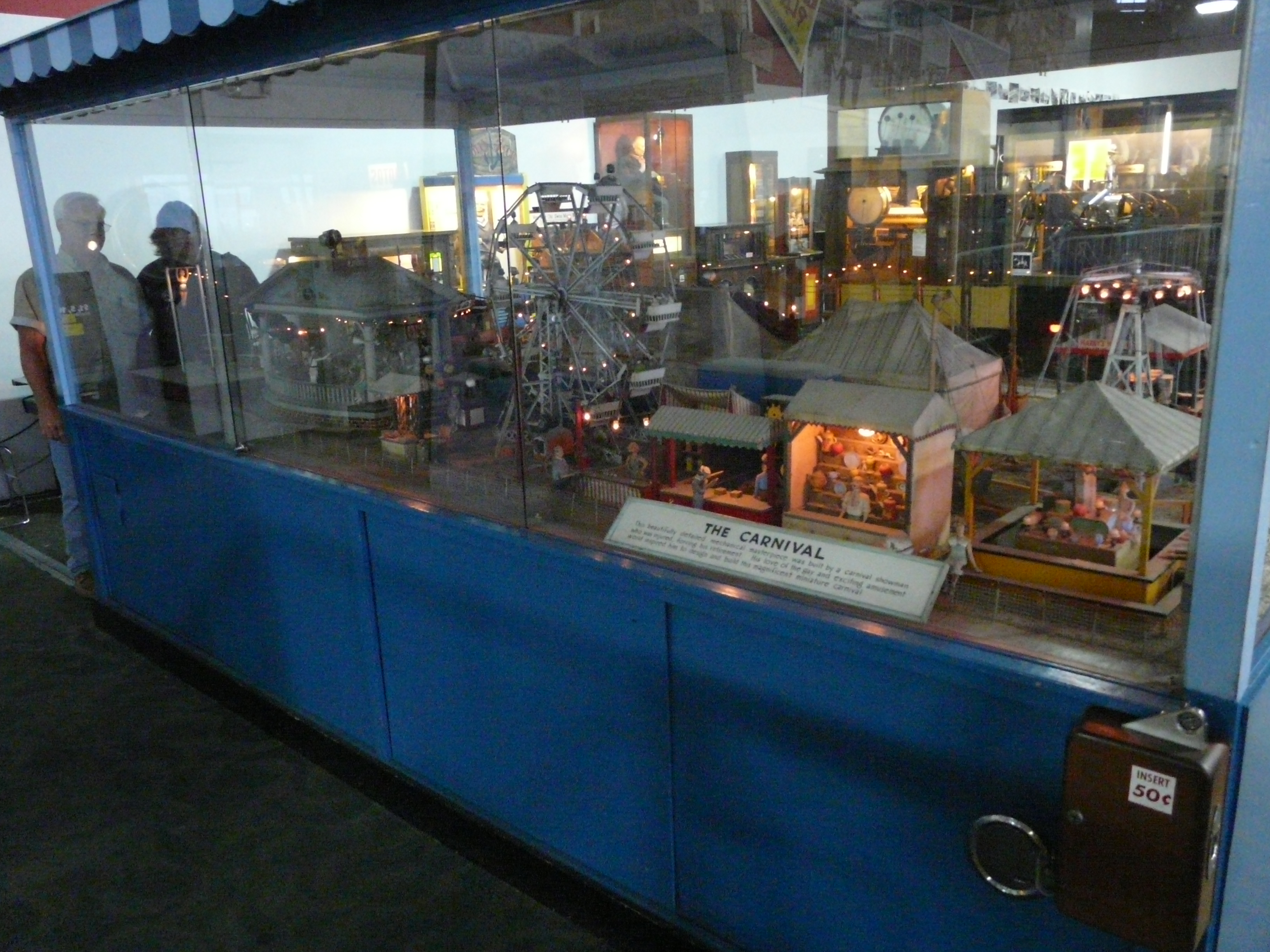
Carnival music box from Playland

== See also ==
- List of music museums
