= Maria Manuela Goyanes =

American theatre producer

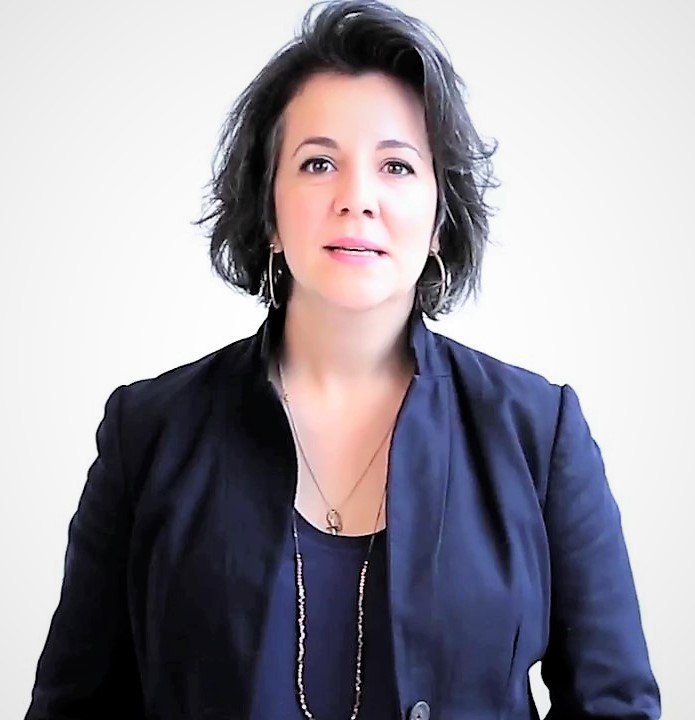
Goyanes in the "Make It Fair" video, 2015

Maria Manuela Goyanes (born September 21, 1979) is an American theatre maker, chiefly known for her work at The Public Theatre in New York City, as well as her September 2018 appointment as the artistic director of Woolly Mammoth Theatre in Washington D.C.

Goyanes graduated with a Bachelor of Arts from Brown University in 2001, where she received the Susan Steinfeld Award. She then worked by the Brown campus in Providence, Rhode Island at the Trinity Repertory Company. In 2004, Goyanes left the company to join the staff of The Public Theatre, in addition to beginning her term as the Executive Producer of 13P. In addition, Goyanes took part in Soho Repertory Theatre's Writer/Director Lab Series as a director and co-chair between 2006-2008. During this time, Goyanes also worked her way up at The Public Theatre, managing projects such as The Public Lab and the 365 Days/365 Plays Festival until she became an Associate Producer, eventually becoming the Director of Producing and Artistic Planning. She became artistic director of Woolly Mammoth in September 2018. In March 2025, Maria became Artistic Director of LCT3 and Producer at Lincoln Center Theatre.

Goyanes received the Josephine Abady Award in 2007 from the League of Professional Theatre Women for her work on "cultural diversity" in theatre. In 2015, she became a member of the National Alliance for Musical Theatre. She also teaches and lectures at various universities.

== Early life ==
Maria Goyanes was raised in Briarwood, Queens and has lived in New York most of her life. She is the daughter of Pedro Goyanes, who was a bus repairman for New York transit (MTA), and Violeta Goyanes, who was a public school teacher. She is first-generation Latinx American, as her parents immigrated to America from the Dominican Republic and Spain; she has called herself a "Spaninican" combining her Spanish and Dominican heritage. After initially wanting to be a director, Goyanes found a place in arts administration, helping produce works by mainly playwrights of color.

Goyanes studied theatre at Brown University and received her Bachelor of Arts in 2001. She was also given the Susan Steinfeld Award for her excellence in the theatre program.

== Career ==
=== Trinity Repertory Company (2001–2004) ===
Goyanes began working at Trinity Repertory Company in 2001 after she graduated from Brown. Trinity Rep is a repertory theatre company in Providence, RI near the Brown campus trying "to reinvent the public square with dramatic art that stimulates, educates and engages our diverse community in a continuing dialogue." She worked as the Associate Producer of the company under Trinity's artistic director Oskar Eustis. In her time at Trinity Rep, she took the charge to create family programming and be a resource for the area's Latinx community, in addition to directing a production of Shakespeare's Much Ado About Nothing for Trinity Rep's Summer Shakespeare Series in 2003.

=== The Public Theatre (2004–2018) ===
When Oskar Eustis left Trinity Rep to come to The Public Theatre in 2004, Goyanes followed. The Public Theatre "is theater of, by, and for the people. Artist-driven, radically inclusive, and fundamentally democratic," the theatre tackles social issues on and off the stage. Goyanes joined the staff as an Artistic Associate and then became the Director of Special Projects. In this role, she was one of the creators of the theatre's Public LAB series in 2008 in participation with LAByrinth Theater Company. The LAB series helped make theatre more accessible by offering audiences less expensive tickets to new or developing work. In this project, Goyanes worked with many artists, including Adrienne Kennedy, Roger Guenveur Smith, Naomi Wallace, and the Civilians; some of the works she helped produce in the LAB went on to become mainstages at The Public. This role also allowed Goyanes to work with Suzan-Lori Parks on her 365 Days/365 Plays Festival where Parks wrote a play every day for a year. They were subsequently staged, starting at The Public Theatre and continuing to many other locations with communication facilitated by Goyanes to 70 theatre companies and over 1,000 individuals.

In September 2010, Goyanes was promoted to be Associate Producer of The Public. She held this position for 6 years, helping produce various successful shows including Hamilton, Fun Home, Straight White Men, and others. She was promoted again to Director of Producing and Artistic Planning in 2016, supervising productions, season planning, and other programming at The Public Theatre. This included all of The Public's venues, overseeing shows that happened in their 5 main theaters in Astor Place, and Shakespeare in the Park at the Delacorte Theatre, special events at Joe's Pub, and their Under the Radar new work festival.

=== 13P (2004–2012) ===
At the same time that Goyanes was beginning at The Public, she was voluntarily taking on the job of Executive Producer for 13P. At 13P, 13 semi-established playwrights decided to form a collective where each of them would direct their play and, with the help of Goyanes and the rest of the staff, put up a full scale production for each new play. The collective won an Obie award in 2005 and disbanded in 2012 after its mission was accomplished. The playwrights were Sarah Ruhl, Young Jean Lee, Sheila Callaghan, Gary Winter, Erin Courtney, Madeleine George, Lucy Thurber, Rob Handel, Ann Marie Healy, Julia Jarcho, Winter Miller, Kate E. Ryan, and Anne Washburn.

=== Soho Repertory Theatre (2006–2008) ===
Goyanes was a part of Soho Rep's Writer/Director Lab from 2006-2008. The Lab aims to "explore and develop the work of a new generation of theater artists and to foster new collaborations between writers and directors in the beginning stages of the creative process" to result in "ambitious" new work. She first took part in the Writer/Director Lab for the 2006/2007 season when she directed Do Not Do This Ever Again by Karinne Keithly. In the 2007/2008 season, she directed The Moon is a Dead World by Mike Daisey, and served as a Co-Chair alongside Daniel Manley.

=== Woolly Mammoth Theatre Company (2018-2025) ===
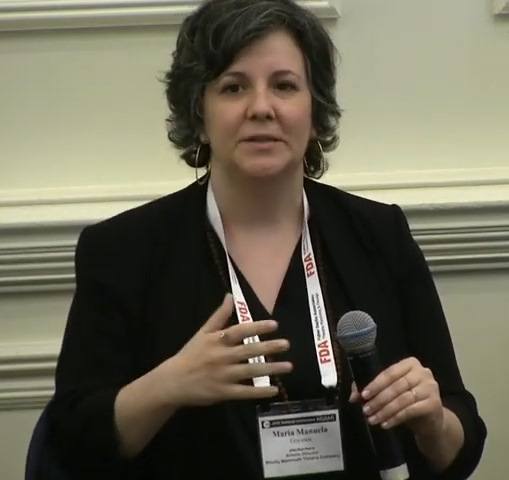
Maria Manuela Goyanes in June 2019

Goyanes is the Artistic Director of Woolly Mammoth Theatre Company, a "radically-inclusive" theatre company in Washington, D.C. that strives "[t]o create rousing, visceral, enlightening theater experiences that galvanize diverse artists and audiences to engage with our world in unexpected and often challenging ways." Woolly Mammoth spent multiple years planning and 8 months searching before picking Goyanes to succeed founder and Artistic Director Howard Shalwitz.

Linette S. Hwu, the President of Woolly Mammoth's Board of Directors said that “Maria has a compelling vision for the art Woolly can make, the impact we can have with that art, and the ways in which everything we do can galvanize communities.” Howard Shalwitz also expressed his feelings about Maria Goyanes taking over his role: “I am filled with pride, a sense of awe, and great anticipation as I imagine Woolly Mammoth unfolding under Maria’s leadership. She has the taste, mind, passion, and fearlessness that will drive Woolly to new frontiers. She’s been a champion for adventurous playwrights and an inspiration for great actors, directors, and designers, and she’s poised to play a leadership role in our city and in our field.”

=== Lincoln Center Theatre (beginning in 2025) ===
On March 19, 2025, Goyanes was announced as the new Artistic Director and Producer of LCT3, the division of Lincoln Center Theatre that produces new work. Her work will begin with the 2025-2026 season.

=== Teaching and lecturing ===
Goyanes co-teaches an Elements of Producing class in the Juilliard School of Drama for graduate students. She also works with the Playwrights Horizon's Theatre School at NYU to help build the classes for students in their junior year of the Playwrights Downtown program.

She also lectures at various universities like NYU, Barnard, Brown, Yale, Columbia, Bard, Juilliard, Marymount Manhattan, Pace, University of California San Diego, and the University of Texas-Austin.

== Notable productions and collaborators ==
| Show | Playwright | Theatre Company | Year | Goyanes' Role |
|---|---|---|---|---|
| Twelfth Night (musical adaptation) | Shina Taub | The Public Theater (Public Works) | 2016 | Associate Producer |
| Eclipsed | Danai Gurira | The Public Theater (mainstage) | 2015 | Associate Producer |
| Hamilton | Lin-Manuel Miranda | The Public Theater (mainstage) | 2015 | Associate Producer |
| Josephine & I | Cush Jumbo | The Public Theater (mainstage) | 2015 | Associate Producer |
| Barbecue | Robert O'Hara | The Public Theater (mainstage) | 2015 | Associate Producer |
| The Odyssey (musical adaptation) | Todd Almond | The Public Theater (Public Works) | 2015 | Associate Producer |
| Straight White Men | Young Jean Lee | The Public Theater (mainstage) | 2014 | Associate Producer |
| Grounded | George Brant | The Public Theater (mainstage) | 2014 | Associate Producer |
| The Winter's Tale (musical adaptation) | Lear deBessonet and Todd Almond | The Public Theater (Public Works) | 2014 | Associate Producer |
| Here Lies Love | David Byrne and Fatboy Slim | The Public Theater (mainstage) | 2013 | Associate Producer |
| Fun Home | Jeanine Tesori and Lisa Kron | The Public Theater (mainstage) | 2013 | Associate Producer |
| The Tempest (musical adaptation) | Todd Almond | The Public Theater (Public Works) | 2013 | Associate Producer |
| Melancholy Play | Sarah Ruhl | 13P | 2012 | Executive Producer |
| Map of Virtue | Erin Courtney | 13P | 2012 | Executive Producer |
| We're Gonna Die | Young Jean Lee | 13P | 2011 | Executive Procuder |
| Zero Hour | Madeleine George | 13P | 2010 | Executive Producer |
| Bloody Bloody Andrew Jackson | Alex Timbers and Michael Friedman | The Public Theater (LAB/mainstage) | 2009/2010 | Director of Special Projects |
| Monstrosity | Lucy Thurber | 13P | 2009 | Executive Producer |
| American Treasure | Julia Jarcho | 13P | 2009 | Executive Producer |
| The Good Negro | Tracey Scott Wilson | The Public Theater (LAB/mainstage) | 2008/2009 | Director of Special Projects |
| Crawl, Fade to White | Sheila Callaghan | 13P | 2008 | Executive Producer |
| Penalties & Interest | Rebecca Cohen | The Public Theater (LAB) | 2008 | Director of Special Projects |
| Sweet Storm | Scott Hudson | The Public Theater (LAB) | 2008 | Director of Special Projects |
| The Moon is a Dead World | Mike Daisey | Soho Rep. Writer/Director Lab | 2008 | Director |
| Have You Seen Steve Steven | Ann Marie Healy | 13P | 2007 | Executive Producer |
| Do Not Do This Ever Again | Karinne Keithly | Soho Rep. Writer/Director Lab | 2007 | Director |
| At Said | Gary Winter | 13P | 2006 | Executive Producer |
| The Internationalist | Anne Washburn | 13P | 2006 | Executive Producer |
| Mark Smith | Kate E. Ryan | 13P | 2006 | Executive Producer |
| Aphrodisiac | Rob Handel | 13P | 2005 | Executive Producer |
| The Penetration Play | Winter Miller | 13P | 2004 | Executive Producer |
| Much Ado About Nothing | William Shakespeare | Trinity Repertory Company | 2003 | Director |

== See also ==
· · ·
