= Ocean View Amusement Park =

Closed amusement park in Virginia, USA

Coordinates: 36°57′14.91″N 76°15′2.53″W

Ocean View Amusement Park was an amusement park at the end of Granby Street at Ocean View Avenue in Norfolk, Virginia, USA, opened in 1905 and operated by Jack L. Greenspoon and Dudley Cooper. The amusement park and its wooden coaster, the Rocket, appeared in the 1977 movie Rollercoaster but closed on 4 September 1978. The Rocket was destroyed as part of the making of the television program The Death of Ocean View Park in 1979.

The amusement park had five coasters, including the Southern Belle, Leap the Dips, Figure Seven and the Rocket. The history of the park is described at the Ocean View Station Museum in Norfolk, Virginia.

== Vintage features and attractions ==
=== The dance hall ===
In the park's heyday, the dance hall was a place for young singles and couples to meet and socialize. At the west end, outside of the Promenade, it featured live bands and a large wooden floor for dancing. During the 1960s, it fell into disuse and was closed down.

=== The lawn and bath houses ===
The extreme east end of the park was once occupied by a row of public bath houses, where beach-going park visitors could shower and change. Surrounding the bath house complex, as well as the area which was later occupied by the more modern mechanical rides, was an extensive lawn with walks and benches. A Ferris wheel was behind the bath houses, offering riders a view of the bay.

=== The casino ===
On the immediate north side of the main coaster — at that time, it was Leap the Dips — and facing the area of the lawn and bath houses, there was a large casino before gambling was outlawed in Virginia.

=== Flying Aeroplane / Rocket Tower ===
Built around the turn of the 20th century, the Flying Aeroplane/Rocket ride was another main attraction at the park for over 50 years. Taken out of operation by the early 1960s and stripped of its rocket cars and cables, the main tower remained as a landmark until it was demolished on camera as part of the climax of the 1978 feature film The Death Of Ocean View Park.

=== Kiddieland ===
The Kiddieland area was initially much larger, east of the Aeroplane Tower and behind the bath houses, with a small coaster and a miniature train, but was eventually moved to a smaller, roofed-over area closer to the main promenade, next to the ice cream and cotton candy house. There it included miniature boats, miniature race cars, a miniature version of Disneyland's flying teacups, Bulgy the Whale — a miniature flying coaster — and a small merry-go-round.

=== Miniature train ride ===
In the original Kiddieland, to the east of the Flying Aeroplane tower, was a miniature train powered by a scaled-down steam locomotive engine, which ran along a generally oval but slightly meandering path on a scaled-down steel-and-timber railroad track. Operated by a costumed engineer who sat on top and astride the engine, it pulled a number of 4-person open cars and a red caboose.

== The Skyrocket ==
A large wooden roller coaster was always the centerpiece and primary attraction at the park. First built around the turn of the 20th century, the original coaster was known as The Southern Belle. Some time later, after an extensive re-design, it was named Leap The Dips. The final design was a much speedier and thrilling coaster, called The Skyrocket. Shortly before its final demise, the name was abbreviated to The Rocket for use in the role it played in two Hollywood feature films.

Built in 1927 by Edward Vettel, The Skyrocket entertained and thrilled the residents of eastern Virginia and North Carolina for many decades. It usually had two heavy trains of iron-framed, wooden cars simultaneously on the track, which served a steady stream of passengers, and they would plummet down the first drop of probably 60–70 feet at a breathtaking pace. Shaking, rattling, and kicking up sparks over successive hills, drops and tight radial turns, it often gave its riders the feeling that the cars would "skip the track" and send them flying in all directions.

In February 1958, a fire that destroyed a large portion of the west end of the park also caused extensive damage to the western end of The Skyrocket. The coaster was rebuilt by Herbert Schmeck. It remained the favorite ride of many people throughout the years, and riding it— especially without holding on— became something of a "badge of courage" for many a brave youth in the "Tidewater" area of Virginia.

Age and size restrictions were often enforced. Children under 6 years old were refused entry and children over 6 years old were refused entry without an accompanying adult. Pregnant women and the infirm were also discouraged from boarding this ride. Hats and wigs were also prohibited and, after an incident when a woman actually lost her wig on the ride, it became a long-standing custom for the operator to keep a woman's wig on the ride's main release lever as a humorous reminder.

== Other features and attractions ==
=== West End attractions ===
==== The Sky Slide ====
On the extreme West end of the park, adjacent to the defunct dance hall, was an outdoor "Sky Slide". It was a tall, metal structure, probably 40–50 feet tall at its highest point, with perhaps five to seven separate stainless steel slides with three bumps along their path down to ground level. Sliders climbed a long staircase to reach the top of the slide, where each one was issued with a burlap sack on which to sit on the way down. It was the last permanent attraction added to the park, in the mid- to late-1960s.

==== The Promenade ====
A long, open-air, but covered promenade, at one time called the "Fun Pavilion", was located to the north of The Skyrocket, and ran parallel to the coaster and along the beach. Its length and breadth closely matched those of the roller coaster. Beneath its gabled roof, framed by open wooden posts and beams, were a variety of free standing wood frame and masonry buildings, separated by a wide concrete walkway, each housing a number of secondary amusements including:

Dodgem Cars
Located near the West end of the Promenade were the Dodgem Cars.

The Tunnel of Fun
Located near the center of the Promenade area, the Tunnel of Fun was a "dark boat ride", where patrons were beckoned by the voice of a mechanical Red Devil to board and ride, unrestrained, a small wooden boat at the base of a large, wooden, functional waterwheel, which forced a steady stream of water that slowly propelled the boats through a mostly dark, quiet, meandering tunnel. At various stages of the trip, the passing boat would trigger lighted scenes of "fright" and sound intended to surprise and startle the travelers, eliciting many shrieks and laughter which could sometimes be heard over the din of the waterwheel by the waiting or passing crowd outside. The beckoning Red Devil was in a glass-covered pocket high up in the wall, to the observer's left of the large waterwheel and, for a time, was accompanied by a "Laffing Sam" who occupied a similar niche on the right side of the wheel. Each character had its own loudspeaker, which was attached to the outside of the wall, and over their head.

"Laff in the Dark"
A few yards East of the Tunnel of Fun was "Laff in the Dark", a more conventional "dark ride", where patrons sat behind a safety bar in a high backed, cutaway cylindrical car which moved forward, rotated, stopped or reversed in a seemingly random fashion as it followed a fast and erratic course through a darkened room filled with a variety of surprising, and brightly lit "flash frights", triggered by the position of the car, which the hapless passengers were forced to confront. Drawing attention to this ride was "Laffing Sal", another mechanical device in the form of an overweight and rather homely-looking female who did no more than emit a constant stream of insane laughter, while doubling over again and again to the delight of all, excepting a few frightened children.

Also located in the Promenade was:

The Shooting Gallery
Adults and children could shoot .22 caliber rifles and pistols at both fixed and moving targets to test their marksmanship and win prizes. A series of severe injuries aver the years gave this attraction a bad reputation. The Shooting Gallery was also prominently featured in the Rollercoaster film, as the character played by Timothy Bottoms is shown in an early scene winning a stuffed animal, and receiving praise from the operator for his marksmanship before remotely setting off a bomb on the coaster.

The "Penny Arcade"
Located nearly opposite "Laff in the Dark" was the Penny Arcade, where patrons found coin-operated amusements such as a Punching Ball, a "Strength Meter", a mechanical "Fortune Teller", an "Electrocution" machine, "Skee Ball" games, souvenir photo booths, coin-activated gum and candy machines and an antique "Peep Show"— which was a coin-operated, crank-driven, photo-flipping "Cail-O-Scope" featuring, among other themes, a circa 1880s dance routine by "Little Egypt". Contrary to what is shown in the feature film Rollercoaster, there was no live belly dancer appearing in the park.

=== East End attractions ===
Guess Your Weight
Just east of the center of the park, outside of the Promenade, stood a giant scale, where an operator would try to guess the weight and age of park visitors.

The Hammer and Bell
Across the walkway from the giant scale was a hammer and bell, where men could test their strength and try to win a cigar or other prize by using a sledgehammer and lever to drive a small cylindrical weight up a wire to ring a bell fixed to a high wooden backboard.

The Swinger
Resembling a much smaller version of the Flying Aeroplane/Rocket tower, this ride carried 24 individual wooden seats suspended in pairs from cables and revolved at a moderate speed around a central steel tower. It was situated directly in front of the east end snack bar, but was later removed to make way for other attractions.

The Skyliner
The Skyliner was installed in the mid-1960s. Very similar in design and operation to a ski-lift, it carried passengers in double seats with a single safety bar, suspended by a cable, at a slow and easy pace along a straight path and back again, affording them an aerial view of the park and the beach beyond.

Ferris wheel
There were a number of different Ferris wheels in the park throughout its history, both movable and fixed.

The Roll-O-Plane
The popular name of the Roll-O-Plane was "The Salt & Pepper Shaker", because patrons sometimes reported losing loose change or other items from their pockets during the ride.

Round Up
The Round Up was a cylindrical platform ride where standing riders were spun around at a high speed until centrifugal force increased to the point where they were pressed against the wall behind them with such a force that they could not move or fall forward. A control arm would then raise the cylinder to nearly a half-vertical position for a set period of time before the ride was leveled again, and slowed to a stop.

The Paratrooper
The Paratrooper was a small, portable "Umbrella Ride", which was installed in the mid-late-1960s when the popularity of the park began to decline.

The Trabant
The Trabant was an older version of the Wipeout ride, and can be seen in its original location in the Rollercoaster film in a wide-shot scene where the various rides in the park are slowing to a stop following the crash of "The Rocket".

The "Snakes Alive!" Reptile House
The site of the old turn of the century bath house was occupied by the "Snakes Alive!" reptile house in the 1950s and 1960s, with an exhibit of live snakes and, for a time, a fully grown, adult alligator.

=== The Snack Bar ===
A sizable snack bar was located on the east side of the area containing the mechanical rides described above, and served hot dogs, hamburgers, cold drinks, candy and other treats.

== Tickets and passes ==
In the earlier days of the park's operations, each attraction had its own ticket booth, but later on, tickets could generally be purchased for most of the other attractions at any one of these booths.

In the declining years of its operation, general admission whole park passes were issued at a single booth located at the park's main entrance, which was at the sidewalk, near the area of the entry to the Skyrocket. These passes consisted of a colored string, fastened around the wrist of the patron with a small metal clasp, and at one time were sold for one dollar. Initially, the passes were good for entry into all of the rides in the park, except the Skyrocket, but near the very end of operations, entry to that ride was included as well.

== Closing ==
In the mid-1970s, the park was scheduled to be torn down, but was saved from total oblivion when its roller coaster appeared in at least two Hollywood disaster films. Rollercoaster (1977), starring George Segal, Henry Fonda and Timothy Bottoms, used Ocean View Amusement Park as one of many around the US which were being targeted by a mad terrorist bomber (Bottoms). The other film was The Death of Ocean View Park, a "Playboy" production starring Mike Connors (Mannix), Diana Canova and Martin Landau, in which the actual destruction of the coaster was the climax.

A testament to the strength of the old ride's wooden structure remains fixed in the memories of those who witnessed its demolition. When the time came for the filming of the movie's climax, the primary supports of the coaster were fitted with explosive charges. At the director's signal, one of the wooden trains, filled with mannequins, was sent for its "last" ride down the aged track. The charges were set off, blowing the large wooden posts to smithereens, while at the same time, huge, fiery gasoline explosions were set off for visual effect. The coaster refused to budge. The crowd watching from across the street broke into spontaneous laughter and applause. Inspections were made, new charges were set on the secondary supports, and the scenes were re-staged. The charges went off, the coaster remained standing, and the crowd cheered.

Unwilling to spend any more time or money on explosives, the movie company finally devised a way to bring down the Rocket once and for all. A bulldozer, off camera and fitted with cables tied to strategic points along the track, finally did what the dynamite could not, and amid the smoke and fire of one final gasoline bomb, as well as the jeers and tears from the crowd, it slowly dragged the coaster to the ground.

== Present day site ==
After Ocean View Amusement Park was torn down, the area it once occupied was replaced by a residential condominium, a residential housing development and a public park and beach.

The coordinates given above represent the approximate point where riders would board and exit The Skyrocket throughout its history, before its final demolition in 1978. Many of the other attractions seen in the Hollywood films, including the Salt & Pepper Shaker Ferris wheel and the much older Rocket Plane Tower, were located in the area of the current three-winged high-rise condominium to the immediate east of this point. The Shooting Gallery, the Penny Arcade, the Tunnel of Fun boat ride and Laff in the Dark were situated in the green areas now to the north, adjacent to the boardwalk which runs along the border of the public beach.
