= Yeti (development company) =

American software company

- Founded: 2010 in San Francisco, California
- Founders: Tony Scherba & Rudy Mutter
- Products: Application development
- Website: www.yeti.co

Yeti is a software, strategy, design, and application development firm based in San Francisco, California. It was founded in 2010 by Tony Scherba and Rudy Mutter.

== Beginnings and early history ==
Yeti co-founders Anthony Scherba and Rudy Mutter met each other while attending Northeastern University in Boston, Massachusetts, where they both double-majored in computer science and business. As teenagers, Scherba and Mutter developed websites on their own. This common interest prompted them to start working together, getting them their first client a week after graduation.

== Present day ==
Yeti is located in a warehouse converted into a software invention workshop in the San Francisco SoMa district. The company has worked with other tech firms in the San Francisco Bay Area and Silicon Valley and has innovated software and hardware products.

Yeti is active on the Django development community in San Francisco, having organized local meet-ups and providing free courses on the framework for web applications.

== Development process ==
Yeti builds clients' app ideas via product design, research and development, and business-minded delivery analysis. Yeti's work on product design entails workshops, user testing, branding, roadmaps and web/app design. The research and development phase may consist of rapid prototyping, iOS and Android testing, robotics, Bluetooth and virtual reality applications. Yeti creates custom delivery for clients utilizing open sourcing, Agile development, beta testing, launch support and scaling.
