= Marcks Family Miniature Circus =

Coordinates: 37.9168°N 122.3128°W

- Artist: Isaac Marcks and Donald Marcks
- Location: Since 2018, private collection (not on display)

The Marcks Family Miniature Circus is a miniature representation of the Sells Floto Circus of the 1930s. It was conceived and originated by Isaac Marcks and hand carved over the span of 50 years by him and his son Donald Marcks, publisher of the popular weekly publication Circus Report.

The circus is built to a scale of one-half inch equals one foot and consists of multiple tents and scores of wagons and people, all hand carved. All figures are exact copies of the Sells Floto Circus as it appeared on a particular date, June 30, 1930. With over 300,000 pieces in the collection, the miniature circus main tent stands 25 inches tall and is 5 feet wide and 11 feet long. Until 2018 it was on display at Playland-Not-At-The-Beach in El Cerrito, CA. When Playland-Not-At-The-Beach closed, the miniature circus was put up for auction. Each of the five circus-wagon display cases and its contents were auctioned separately, and they sold for a total of $15,500.
