= Memory Lane Arcade =

Arcade amusement park

- Interactive map of Memory Lane Arcade
- Location: 626, South Main Street, Frankenmuth, Michigan, United States
- Coordinates: 43°19′0.912″N 83°44′25.115″W
- Status: Defunct
- Opened: April 29, 1975; 51 years ago
- Closed: November 28, 2004
- Owner: Dennis R. Atkinson
- General manager: Dennis R. Atkinson
- Theme: Coin-operated machines
- Slogan: "Proud to be an American"
- Operating season: Summer through Fall, Xmas Weekends
- Website: Official website

Memory Lane Arcade was an arcade amusement park located in Frankenmuth, Michigan. It was opened on April 29, 1975 by Dennis R. Atkinson and his wife Irene. It closed on November 28, 2004. It is notable for its collection of old-fashioned activities, including coin-operated fortune tellers, arcade games, roll-playing instruments and attractions. Many games were pretty cheap to play. Admission in the arcade was completely free.

Apart from 100 years worth of penny arcades, the place also offered modern services including 3D movies, sports and computer games. In 1984, Atkinson won an Association de la Sommellerie Internationale award for the "Taito America Elevator Action Kit". By 1995, there was a trend that children were not getting their money's worth from playing games and winning prize.

== Highlights ==
- 200 year-old Orchestrion
- Buzzy Buzzy Bee
- Grandmothers Predictions
- Kiss-O-Meter
- Laffing Sal's Funhouse
- Mystic Swami
- Personality Indicator
- Pinball games
- Play Golf
- Player pianos
- The Egyptian Mummy Answers Your Question
