= Janet Delaney =

American photographer and educator

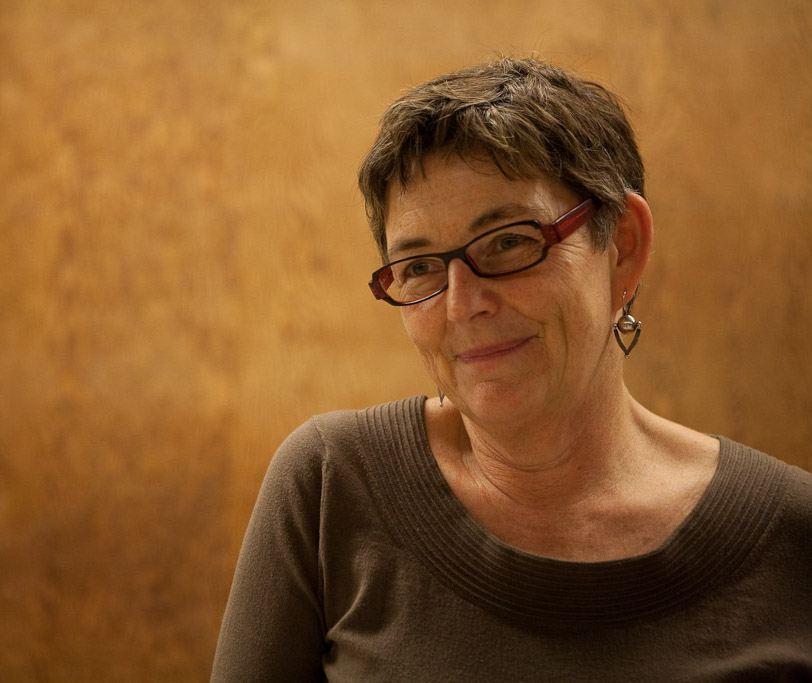
Janet Delaney in 2009

Janet Delaney (born 1952) is an American photographer and educator based in Berkeley, California. Her books include South of Market (2013), Public Matters (2018), and Red Eye to New York (2021), all published by MACK, and Too Many Products Too Much Pressure (2025) published by Deadbeat Club.

== Life and work ==
Born in 1952 in Compton, California, Delaney relocated to the San Francisco Bay Area in 1971. She received a BFA with honors from San Francisco State University (1975), and an MFA from the San Francisco Art Institute (1981).

=== Teaching ===
Delaney was a professor at the College of San Mateo from 1980 to 1991. She was a guest professor at Santa Clara University during 1986, 1989, and 1995. She taught at the San Francisco Art Institute in 1991, 1994, 1997, 2014, and 2015. From 1998 to 2015, she was an adjunct professor in the Visual Studies department at the University of California, Berkeley.

=== South of Market ===
Delaney is best known for her series, South of Market, which she began in 1978 when she moved to the South of Market neighborhood of San Francisco, an area undergoing transition due to gentrification and urban renewal. Using a large format camera and color film, Delaney photographed her neighbors in their places of work, businesses, apartments, and out on the street. She also conducted oral interviews with many of her subjects and produced 35 mm slides, which she showed alongside her photographs in the exhibition Form Follows Finance: A Survey of the South of Market at SF Camerawork (1982) and the Nova Scotia College of Art and Design (1983).

In 2013, Mack published the photographs with excerpts from the recorded interviews in South of Market 1978-1986, Delaney's first book. Two years later, the work was featured in the exhibition Janet Delaney: South of Market, at the de Young Museum, San Francisco from January to July, 2015.

Delaney returned to the South of Market area to photograph the radical changes that had occurred in the decades since she first lived there, several examples of which were published in the catalogue that accompanied the show at the de Young.

=== Public Matters ===
Following her original work on South of Market, Delaney began her series titled Public Matters in 1982. Public Matters centers primarily around the Latino community and Mission District during the 1980s, a rather tumultuous political period. Once again using a large format camera and color film, Delaney took to the streets with San Francisco natives to capture them during community gatherings, like the annual Cinco de Mayo parade, during political rallies, like the Peace, Jobs, and Justice marches, or simply while lounging in front of their homes and businesses. Public Matters captures the spirit of San Francisco during a period of high immigration and political strife, documenting the resilience and energy of the city's communities.

In 2018, Mack published the photographs in a photo book with the same name as the series. That year, Delaney featured the work in a solo exhibit at the Euqinom Gallery in San Francisco, from November to December, 2018.

== Publications ==
- South of Market. London: Mack, 2013. ISBN 978-1-907946-38-7. With texts by Delaney and Erin O'Toole, and interviews conducted by Delaney and Laura Graham.
- Public Matters. London: Mack, 2018. ISBN 978-1-912339-02-0.
- Red Eye to New York. London: Mack, 2021. ISBN 978-1-913620-38-7.

== Awards ==
- 1979, 1982, 1986: grants from the National Endowment for the Arts
- 2020: Guggenheim Fellowship from the John Simon Guggenheim Memorial Foundation

== Collections ==
Delaney's work is held in the following permanent collections:

- Bancroft Library, University of California at Berkeley
- De Saisset Museum, Santa Clara University, CA
- Harry Ransom Center, University of Texas at Austin
- Musée de la photographie à Charleroi, Charleroi, Belgium
- Oakland Museum of California
- Pilara Foundation, San Francisco
- San Francisco Museum of Modern Art
