= Fever/Dream =

Play by Sheila Callaghan

- Written by: Sheila Callaghan
- Original language: English

Premiere
- Date premiered: 2009
- Place premiered: Woolly Mammoth Theatre Company; Washington, D.C.

Fever/Dream is a play by Sheila Callaghan which premiered in 2009 at Woolly Mammoth Theatre Company in Washington, DC. It is a reinvention of Pedro Calderón de la Barca's play Life is a Dream.

== Plot summary ==
In Fever/Dream, Segis Basil works in the basement of the American mega-corporation Basil Enterprises, chained to his desk in the customer service department. He is the son of the company's influential CEO, Bill Basil. Unfortunately, Segis was born on Black Monday, and his mother's death during childbirth led his superstitious father to keep him secluded. In the play, the aging Basil reflects on the future of his corporation and offers his son a chance to manage it for a day. When Segis misinterprets business metaphors, causing the company's stock to plummet, he is sent back to the basement and told it was all a dream. Concurrently, Stella Strong and Aston Martin vie for top positions, while bike messenger Rose and temp Claire conspire to undermine the company.

== Overview ==
The Washington Post said of the show: "Ace comic performances, sleek design and bracing direction. Enjoyably stylish [with an] antic pace and witty aesthetic."

Metro Weekly called it: "A pizzazz-filled concoction that skewers corporatism with a generous supply side of laughs. [Callaghan] is without doubt the purveyor of top-shelf American wit. Director Howard Shalwitz, utterly simpatico with Callaghan's fast and furious twists and turns, delivers a superbly entertaining production, keeping his excellently cast ensemble primed and spinning like so many plates in the air."
