= Woolly Mammoth Theatre Company =

Non-profit theatre company in Washington, D.C.

- Company logo
- Formation: 1980
- Type: Theatre group
- Purpose: New Plays/World Premieres
- Location: Washington, D.C.
- Artistic director: Maria Manuela Goyanes
- Website: http://www.woollymammoth.net

Woolly Mammoth Theatre Company is a non-profit theatre company located at 641 D Street NW in the Penn Quarter neighborhood of Washington, D.C. Founded in 1980, it produces new plays which it believes to be edgy, challenging, and thought-provoking. Performances are in a 265-seat courtyard-style theater.

Woolly Mammoth is led by Artistic Director Maria Manuela Goyanes, a celebrated American theatre producer, and Managing Director Kimberly E. Douglas.

== History ==
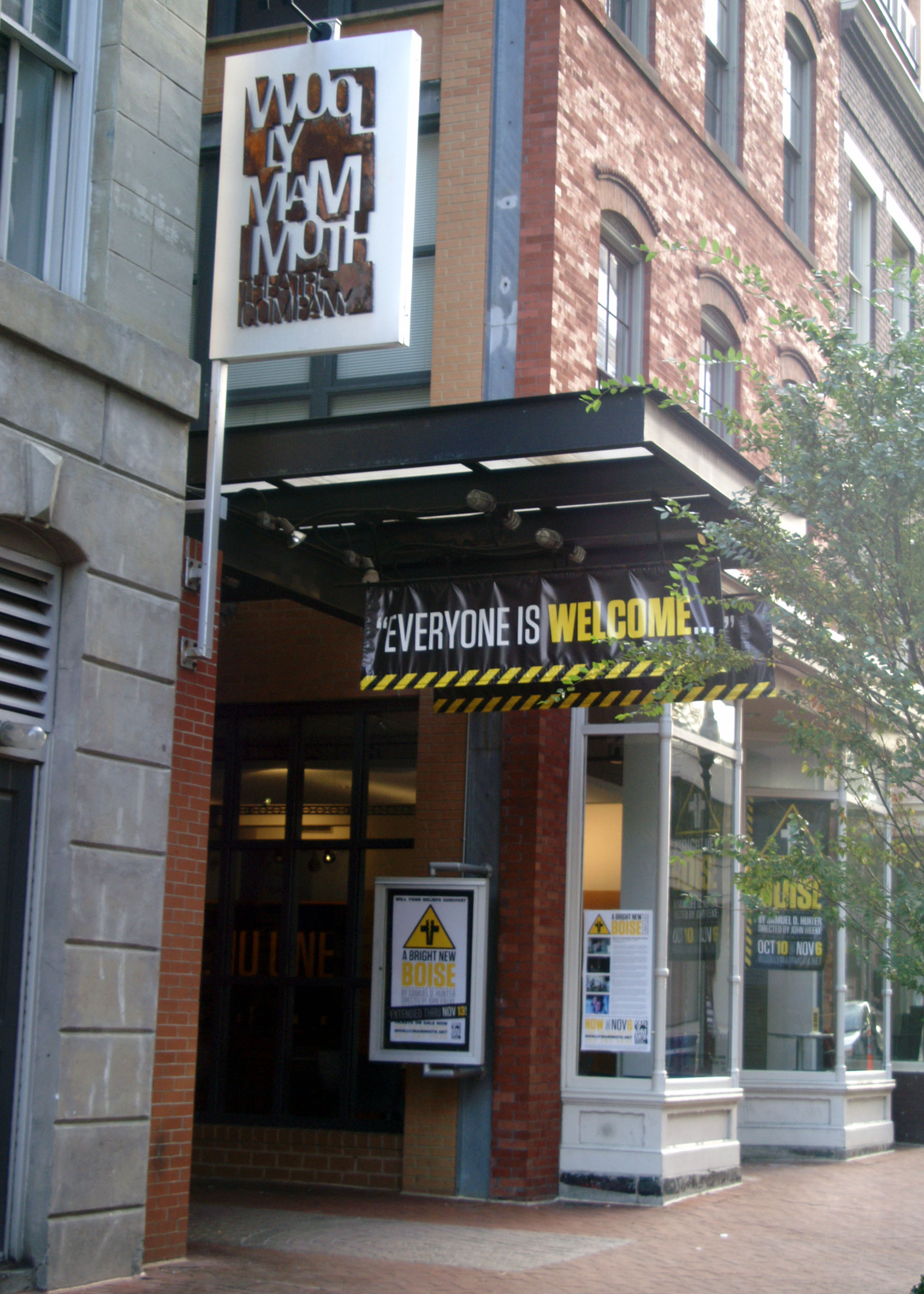
Woolly Mammoth exterior during run of Second City's "Spoiler Alert, Everybody Dies"

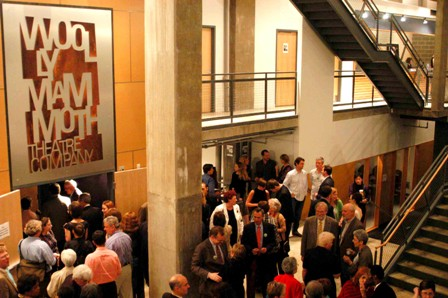
Woolly Mammoth Theatre Lobby

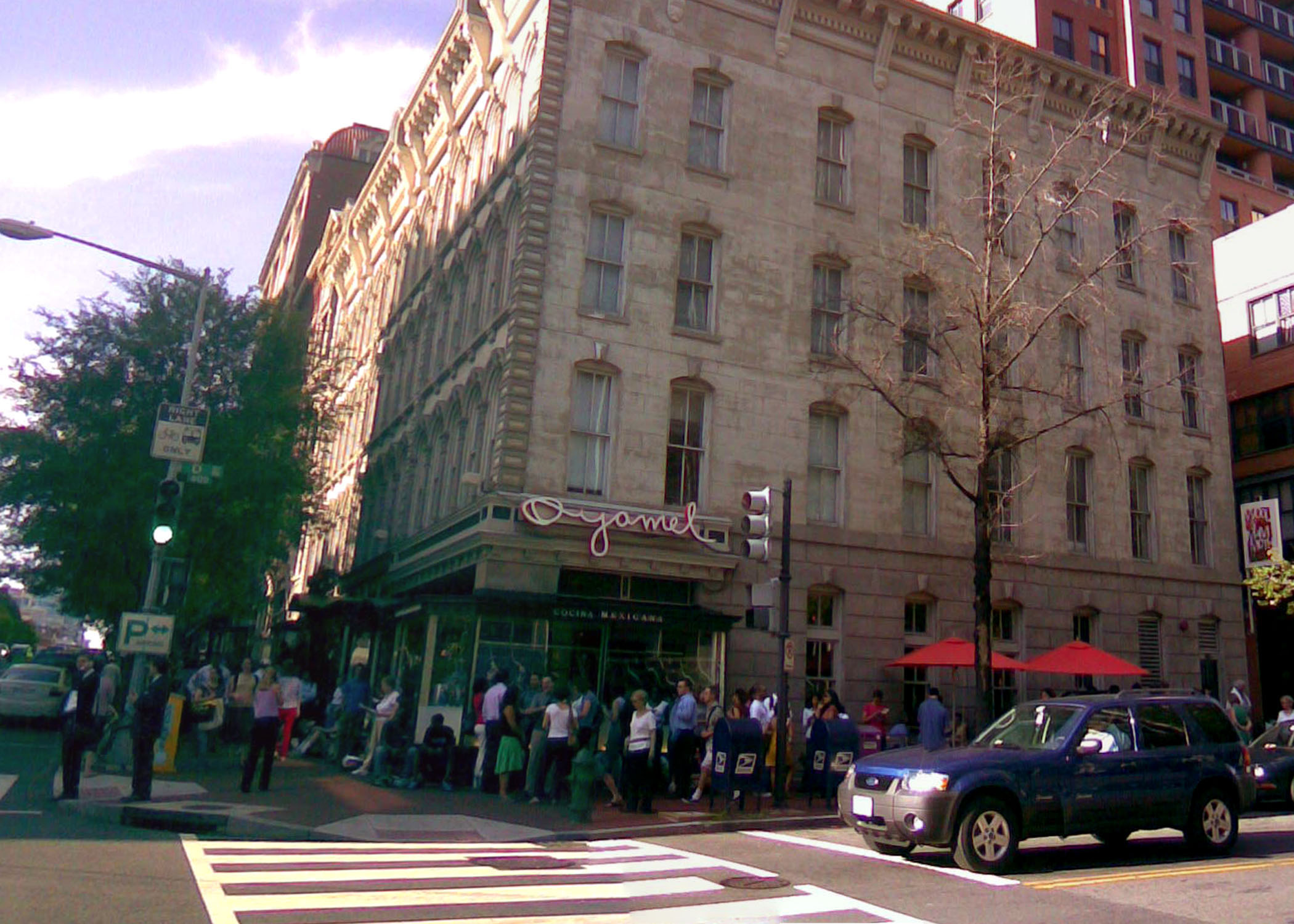
A Woolly Mammoth PWYC Line

Woolly Mammoth was founded by Howard Shalwitz, Roger Brady, and Linda Reinisch in 1980. "While working odd jobs to make money, we held our first auditions outdoors in Glover Park and started improvisatory workshops in the auditorium of the HHS building." It opened its first season in The Church of the Epiphany parish hall near Metro Center. Outgrowing this initial home, the company rented a warehouse in the 14th Street corridor, where it performed for 13 years. When that space ceased to be available, Woolly Mammoth became a nomad company, performing in various venues in the DC area. During this period the company worked with the Pennsylvania Avenue Development Corporation to acquire space for and to outfit a new theatre.

"Woolly's goal is to challenge our artists and our audiences in ways that are fun and exciting and theatrically adventurous. People can enjoy Woolly who are Democrats or Republicans, liberals or conservatives, because we're trying to come at audiences from unexpected points of view. We would rather be politically challenging and uncomfortable and prickly and put images in front of people that make them think and surprise them, rather than just congratulating our audience for being the people they are."

Opened in 2005, its permanent home is a $9 million, 265-seat courtyard-style theater. It was designed by Washington-based architect Mark McInturff in association with Theatre Project Consultants. The space has won local, regional, and national awards for innovative architectural design, including the American Institute of Architects 2006 Institute Honor Award for Interior Architecture and the US Institute for Theatre Technology Honor Award.

In 2018, Woolly Mammoth hired Maria Manuela Goyanes as its artistic director, succeeding founder Howard Shalwitz. Goyanes is known for her production successes at the Public Theater in New York as well as for being a theater educator and leader.

Plays that have premiered at Woolly Mammoth have been produced in more than 200 theaters in 39 states and 12 countries.

The theatre's education and outreach programs include "Pay-What-You-Can" (PWYC) performances providing access to all residents regardless of economic means, and "Playmaking," which pairs students with professional playwrights. "Woolly D.C." is a program where a neighborhood joins to create an original production based on an issue of common community concern, and there are internships, workshops, and theater classes, including a partnership with the University of Maryland, College Park.

== Current and recent productions ==
For resident theatre companies "repertory is destiny" – a theatre company acquires its audience by the productions it presents. Woolly Mammoth's productions are new plays that "explore the edges of theatrical style and human experience."

== Notable playwrights and productions ==
Woolly Mammoth has produced works by the following playwrights in the seasons indicated:

- David Adjmi: Stunning (2007–08)
- Robert Alexander: The Last Orbit of Billy Mars (1998–99)
- Sheila Callaghan: Fever/Dream (2008–09)
- Bridget Carpenter: The Faculty Room (2005–06)
- Ian Cohen: Lenny & Lou (2004–05)
- Lisa D'Amour: Detroit (2013-2014)
- Mike Daisey: If You See Something Say Something (2007–08); How Theater Failed America (2008–09); The Last Cargo Cult (2009–10); The Agony and the Ecstasy of Steve Jobs (2010–11); The Trump Card (2016–2017)
- Amy Freed: Psychic Life of Savages (1994–95); Freedomland (1998–99)
- Melissa James Gibson: Current Nobody (2007–08)
- Jason Grote: Maria/Stuart (2008–09); Civilization: all you can eat (2011–2012)
- Danai Gurira: Eclipsed (2009–10); The Convert (2012–13); Familiar (2017–2018)
- Samuel D. Hunter: A Bright New Boise (2011–2012)
- Michael R. Jackson: A Strange Loop (2021-2022)
- Branden Jacobs-Jenkins: The Comeuppance (2024-2025) co-produced with The Wilma Theater
- Sherry Kramer: David's Redhaired Death (1990–91)
- Tracy Letts: Bug (1999–2000)
- David Lindsay-Abaire: Wonder of the World (1999–2000)
- Julia Masli: Ha Ha Ha Ha Ha Ha Ha (2023-2024)
- Bruce Norris: The Unmentionables (2007–08); Clybourne Park (2009–10), winner 2011 Pulitzer Prize for Drama
- Robert O'Hara: Antebellum (2008–09); Bootycandy (2010–11); Zombie: The American (2014–15)
- Philip Ridley: The Pitchfork Disney (1994–95)
- Sarah Ruhl: The Clean House (2004–05); Dead Man's Cell Phone (2006–07), which subsequently was produced at Playwrights Horizons in New York and Steppenwolf Theatre Company in Chicago
- Laura Schellhardt, The K of D (2008)
- Nicky Silver: Fat Men in Skirts (1990–91); Free Will & Wanton Lust (1992–93); The Food Chain (1993–94); Raised in Captivity (1996–97)
- Anne Washburn: Mr. Burns, a post-electric play (2011–12)
- Craig Wright: Recent Tragic Events (2002–03); Grace (2003–04)
- Doug Wright: Watbanaland (1995–96); Quills (1996–97)

== Awards ==
In 2014 Howard Shalwitz was awarded the Margo Jones Award for his founding and direction of the Woolly Mammoth Theatre Company.

Overall, the company has earned over 130 Helen Hayes nominations and won 35 Helen Hayes Awards. Its more prestigious awards include:

- 2013 The Charles MacArthur Award for Outstanding New Play or Musical, Stupid Fucking Bird
- 2013 Outstanding Resident Play, Stupid Fucking Bird
- 2008 The Charles MacArthur Award for Outstanding New Play or Musical, Dead Man's Cell Phone.
- 2007 Outstanding Non-Resident Production, In the Continuum.
- 2006 Outstanding Resident Play, The Clean House.
- 2006 The Charles MacArthur Award for Outstanding New Play or Musical, Starving.
- 1996 Outstanding Resident Play, The Pitchfork Disney.
- 1994 The Charles MacArthur Award for Outstanding New Play or Musical, Free Will and Wanton Lust.
- 1991 Outstanding Resident Musical, The Rocky Horror Show.
- 1988 Outstanding New Play, National Defense.
- 1987 Outstanding New Play, New York Mets.
- 1986 Outstanding New Play, Metamorphosis.

== Affiliations ==
Woolly Mammoth is a member of the National New Play Network, Theatre Communications Group, the League of Washington Theaters, and the Cultural Alliance of Greater Washington. The theatre's programs are supported by the National Endowment for the Arts, the D.C. Commission on the Arts and Humanities, and the National Capital Arts and Cultural Affairs Program of United States Commission of Fine Arts.

== Notes ==
Woolly Mammoth is a Blue Star Theatre – part of a collaboration between the Theatre Communications Group and Blue Star Families offering discounted admission to all military personnel, their families and U.S. veterans.

== See also ==
- Helen Hayes Award
- List of theaters in Washington, D.C.
