= Playland-Not-At-The-Beach =

Coordinates: 37.916831°N 122.312836°W

- Established: 2000
- Dissolved: 2018
- Location: El Cerrito, California
- Website: http://www.playland-not-at-the-beach.org/

Playland-Not-At-The-Beach was a non-profit, family-oriented museum in El Cerrito, California celebrating America's bygone amusements, operated entirely by volunteers.

The museum's 25 exhibits had specific emphasis on the attractions that had once existed at Playland at the Beach and the Sutro Baths & Museum. Included were numerous artifacts from the original Whitney's Playland at the Beach, including the giant clown's blue hat from the top of the Playland Funhouse, and Walking Charley, one of the original hand carved life-size wooden characters from the terrace above Laughing Sal in the front window of the Fun House. Thousands of historical items were present, from cases of never-opened books of Playland tickets to original signage, parts of rides and games, rare photographs, employee uniforms, and prizes from the Playland arcade games. Additionally, there were over 30 pinball games, carnival skill games, dioramas celebrating Halloween and the Yuletide season, and miniature circuses, including the Marcks Family Miniature Circus.

== History ==
Playland-Not-At-The-Beach came into fruition in 2000 when El Cerrito businessman Richard Tuck purchased a 10,000-square-foot (930 m^{2}) building that had formerly been a grocery store. Tuck, an enthusiastic collector for the majority of his life, used the former store as a place to keep various objects he had acquired, including Playland artifacts. Upon hearing of his Playland relics, community members began to show an interest and volunteered to organize and catalog his collections. Tuck then made the decision to turn the building into a museum dedicated to fun. After eight years of design work and construction, Playland-Not-At-The-Beach opened on May 31, 2008.

Playland-Not-At-The-Beach was featured on the local San Francisco television show Eye on the Bay on November 23, 2009.

Just as Playland at the Beach closed on Labor Day in 1972, Playland-Not-At-The-Beach closed on Labor Day in 2018 after more than 10 years of non-profit community service.

== See also ==
- List of abandoned amusement parks
- Laffing Sal
- Pacific Pinball Museum, Alameda, CA
