= American Bookbinders Museum =

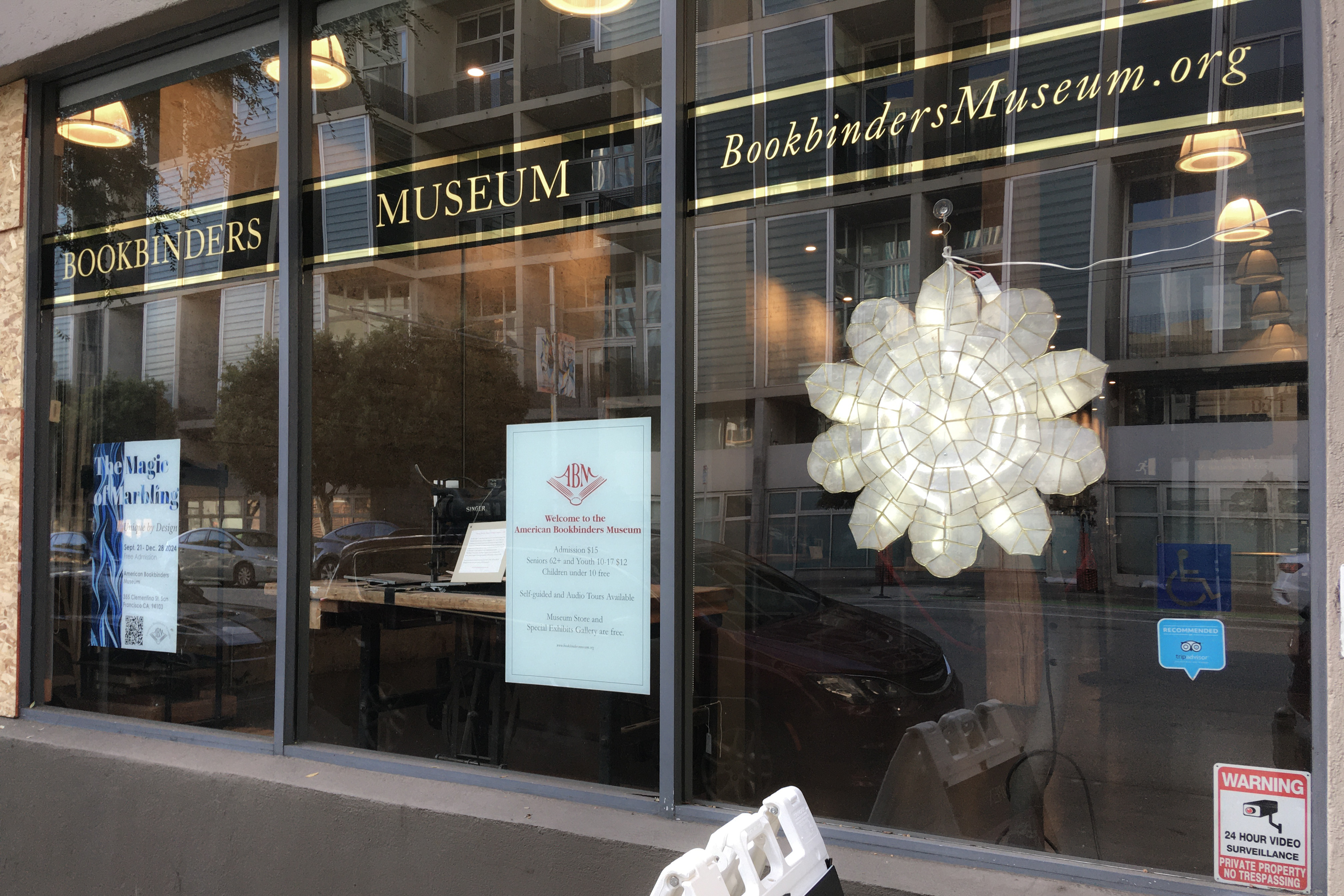
- Established: 2009
- Location: San Francisco, California
- Type: Not-for-profit museum about bookbinding
- Executive director: Anita Engles
- Website: bookbindersmuseum.org

The American Bookbinders Museum is a small, not-for-profit museum in San Francisco, California, dedicated to showcasing the artistry, history, and craft of bookbinding.

The Museum opened as a private museum in 2009. In 2015 it relocated to a larger location in the South of Market neighborhood, where it opened to the public, offering docent-led and self-guided tours. The Museum focuses on the history of the book as object, examining the transition in the 1800s from hand-bookbinding to industrialized book manufacture, using 19th century equipment, much of it functioning. The Museum, a nonprofit corporation, was started by Tim James, a Bay Area bookbinder. In 2017 James stepped away from his involvement in the Museum, which continued in operation.

In addition to tours, the Museum hosts rotating exhibits, as well as special tours and workshops. The Museum has a Special Collection of books, equipment, and ephemera which is available to researchers. The New York Times described it as "a small, obsessive collection of machinery and ephemera."
