= The K of D =

The K of D, an Urban Legend is a play by Laura Schellhardt, which premiered at Woolly Mammoth Theatre Company in 2008.

== Plot summary ==
The K of D presents an urban legend set in a small town in Ohio during one hot, sticky August summer. The local teenagers run wild until one of their group, Jamie McGraw, is killed by a reckless driver. His sister, Charlotte, stopped speaking when her twin brother died and there's reason to believe she may have gained a powerful gift from his dying kiss. The K of D is a summertime ghost story about lonely girl with a lethal skill.

== Overview ==
The play consists of one woman portraying sixteen characters.

After its premiere, The Washington Post called it: “Dynamic…a tour de force…"
