= Laffing Sal =

Animatronic

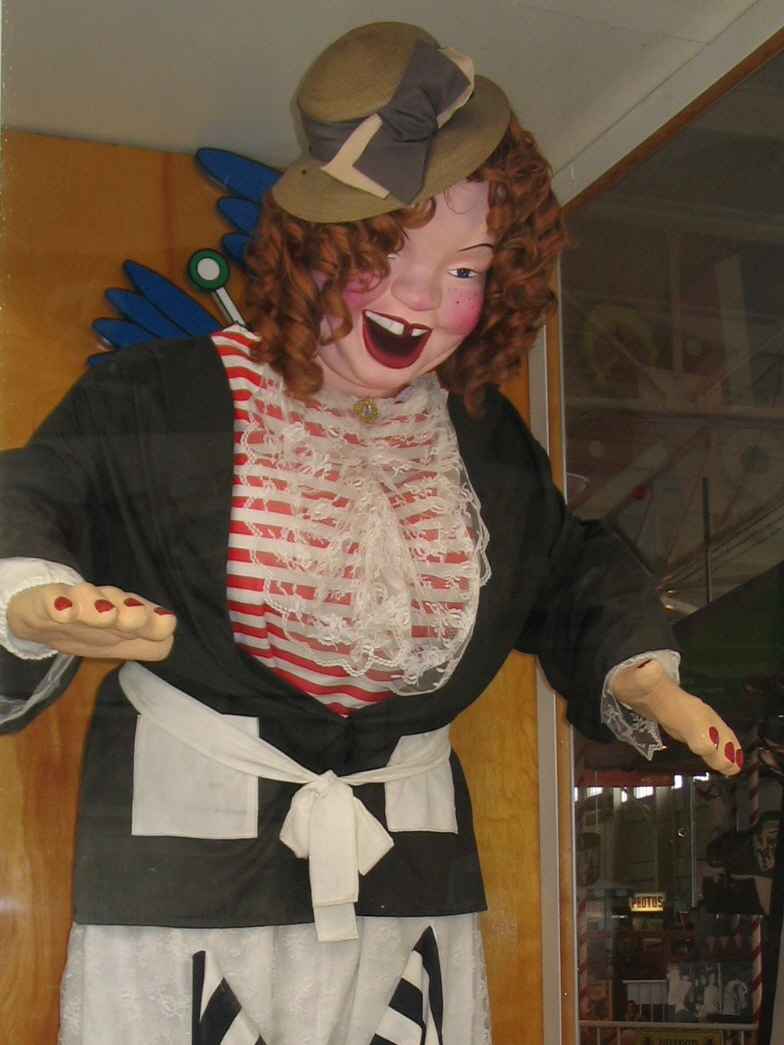
Close-up of Laffing Sal at the Musée Mécanique in San Francisco

Laffing Sal is one of several animatronic characters that were built primarily to attract carnival and amusement park patrons to funhouses and dark rides throughout the United States. Its movements were accompanied by a raucous laugh that sometimes frightened small children and annoyed adults.

== History ==
Laffing Sal (sometimes incorrectly called "Laughing Sal") was produced by the Philadelphia Toboggan Company (PTC) of Germantown, Pennsylvania during the 1930s. PTC subcontracted fabrication of the figures to the Old King Cole Papier Mache Company of Canton, Ohio.

The figure stood 6 feet 10 inches (2.1 meters) high, including a 12-inch (30-centimeter) pedestal. It was made of papier-mâché, consisting of seven layers of pressed card stock with horse-hair strengthener, mounted over steel coils and frame. It did not come with a hat — hats were added by the purchaser — but wore a wig and was missing an upper incisor tooth. The head, arms, hands and legs were detachable and were held together with fabric, staples, pins, nails, nuts and bolts. When activated, the figure waved its arms and leaned forward and backward. A record player concealed in its pedestal played a stack of 78 RPM phonograph records of a woman laughing. When the records finished, an attraction operator re-stacked and restarted them. A woman named Tanya Garth performed the laugh.

PTC produced two other "ballyhoo" (attention-getting) figures, Laffing Sam and Blackie the Barker, which used a similar construction. The Pike amusement park in Long Beach, California featured Sal, Sam and Blackie over the center of its Laff In The Dark dark ride.

Laffing Sal was a fixture at the Balboa Fun Zone in Newport Beach, California when it opened in 1936. Decades later, the park's management learned that Funni-Frite Inc. of Pickerington, Ohio still had the original molds of Laffing Sal's head and hands, and commissioned them to make an updated Sal to stand above the entrance of their Scary Dark Ride. An endless tape cartridge provided its audio. The figure was removed when the attraction was closed in 2005.

Sal's asking price in 1940 was US$360, equal to $8273 today; in 2004 the one now in Santa Cruz, California cost the bidder US$50,000.

As one of the first animated amusement park figures, Laffing Sal is considered a forerunner of the many animatronic figures seen at attractions around the world, including the Audio-Animatronic figures at Disney parks.

== In popular culture ==
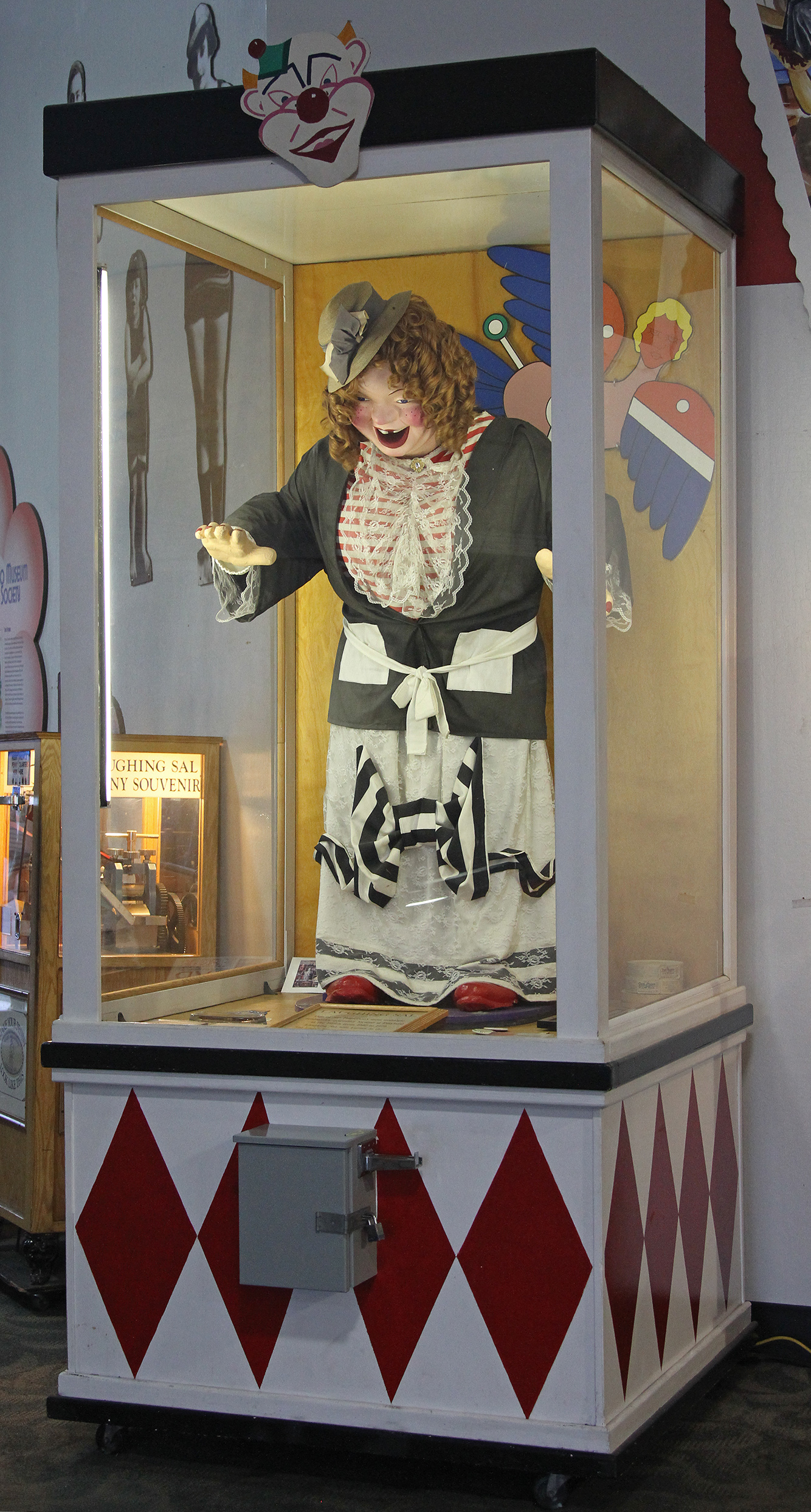
Laffing Sal in her display case at the Musée Mécanique in San Francisco

- A Laffing Sal is seen gazing down on stars Audrey Totter and Edmond O'Brien in the 1953 film Man in the Dark, which was filmed on the Ocean Park Pier.
- A Laffing Sal appears briefly in the 2001 film The Princess Diaries.
- Laffing Sal's soundtrack was used in Neutral Milk Hotel's In the Aeroplane Over the Sea, as noted in the liner notes to their "Holland 1945" single.
- A Laffing Sal appears twice in the 1950 film Woman on the Run during the closing scenes filmed on the Ocean Park Pier.
- The opening scene of the 1951 version of M also shows the Laffing Sal at the Ocean Park Pier.
- The 1954 Technicolor 3-D film Gorilla at Large features the Laffing Sal and Laffing Sam at The Pike (then called Nu-Pike) in Long Beach, California.
- Lawrence Ferlinghetti referenced the, "Laughing Woman at Loona Park / outside the Fun House," in his 1958 poem, "Autobiography".
- A Laffing Sal appears briefly in the Alfred Hitchcock Hour episode "A Tangled Web," first broadcast in 1962, starring Robert Redford and Zohra Lampert.
- A 1963 episode of Perry Mason, "The Case of the Two-Faced Turnabout", features the Laffing Sal and Laffing Sam at the Nu-Pike amusement park in Long Beach, California.
- An episode of The Magician with Bill Bixby features the Laffing Sal at the Nu-Pike amusement park in Long Beach, California in the early 1970s.
- Laffing Sal yuks it up briefly in Hal Ashby's 1971 film Harold and Maude.
- Laffing Sal was the subject of the cartoon strip Zippy the Pinhead on April 16, 1998.
- Laffing Sal appears in issue #5 of the DC Comics comic book series Gotham City Sirens.
- Laffing Sal is mentioned several times in the song "Willie Mays Is Up At Bat" on the Chuck Prophet album Temple Beautiful (2012).
- A Laffing Sal makes an appearance in the 1984 TV series, Partners in Crime which starred Lynda Carter and Loni Anderson. She is seen in the pilot episode.
- Laffing Sal appeared in the maze around the Man at Burning Man 2015.
- A Laffing Sal appears in the 1963 Roger Corman film X: The Man with the X-ray Eyes.
- A Laffing Sal is seen and heard in the background of the comic book store in the 1987 film The Lost Boys.
- A Laffing Sal appears during the carnival scene in the 1990 film Darkman.
- In The Beach Boys’ 1965 song Amusement Parks U.S.A., a Laffing Sal is heard numerous times during the track, as well as being referenced in a verse: “watching girls in the air can really get you bad and I bet the laughing lady makes you laugh like mad.”
- In the 1984 film The Ratings Game, a Laffing Sal is seen in the opening shot of a scene taking place on Santa Monica Pier.

== Locations ==
Laffing Sal at the Santa Cruz Beach Boardwalk

- Balboa Fun Zone Scary Dark Ride in Newport Beach, California (closed in 2005 to provide a site for the Newport Nautical Museum)
- Buckeye Lake Park in Ohio, park closed 1970, current location unknown
- Cedar Point in Sandusky, Ohio (This figure only comes out during "Halloweekends" as a part of the scary attractions. It is a remake dubbed "Laughing Sally".)
- Crystal Beach Park in Ontario, Canada, park closed 1989, Sal is in a private collection
- Erieview Park in Geneva-on-the-Lake, Ohio, Sal was gone several years before the park closed in 2006
- Euclid Beach Park in Cleveland, Ohio (closed in 1969; the figure is now privately owned and still exhibited at local "home days")
- Hamid's Pier in Atlantic City, New Jersey
- Hersheypark in Hershey, Pennsylvania, at entrance of Laff Trakk coaster (Laffing Sal has been removed as of 09/23/2024. It was bought by and now resides with the company obnoxiousantiques and is available to buy or rent.)
- Hunt's Pier in Wildwood, New Jersey
- Idora Park in Youngstown, Ohio. It is strongly believed that this one (dubbed "Laffin' Lena" at Idora Park) was auctioned off to the Playland-Not-at-the-Beach Museum. The recent auction in 2018 claimed that this was the same Laffin' Sal.
- Jantzen Beach Amusement Park in Portland, Oregon, park closed in 1970, location of Sal unknown.
- Kennywood Park in West Mifflin, Pennsylvania; Sal is currently located at the Old Mill loading station. This Laffing Sal debuted at Kennywood Park in 1931.
- Laff-in-the-Dark dark ride, The Pike, Long Beach, California, current location unknown
- Lagoon Fun House in Farmington, Utah, current location unknown
- Lakeside Amusement Park in Denver, Colorado
- Loca Luna in Little Rock, Arkansas has a Laffing Sal that some people claim was once in War Memorial Amusement Park that closed in the early 1990s. Other people claim that the one from the local amusement park was sold at auction to someone in Ohio and that the one at Loca Luna is a different Laffing Sal.
- Memory Lane Arcade in Frankenmuth, Michigan closed in 2004, current whereabouts unknown
- Musée Mécanique (on Pier 45 at Fisherman's Wharf (a copy of Laffing Sal purchased at auction; San Francisco, California)
- Meyers Lake Park In Canton, Ohio (closed in 1974, Laffing Sal is now at the McKinley History Museum in Canton, Ohio)
- Ocean City Life-Saving Station Museum in Ocean City, Maryland
- Ocean View Amusement Park, "Laff In The Dark", Norfolk, Virginia (closed 1979)
- Pacific Ocean Park Santa Monica, California, where it was known as Laffing Gertrude
- Palisades Amusement Park in New Jersey, park closed in 1971, current location unknown
- Playland at the Beach in San Francisco (closed in 1972 and Laffing Sal's head and hat were stolen. J. Ets Hotkins commissioned a new head be created by local artists. One was purchased at auction in 1972 by Musée Mécanique, and the original Sal, without her original head and hat, was also sold in 1972, but had a succession of owners and was eventually purchased by Santa Cruz Beach Boardwalk from auction in 2004.)
- Playland-Not-At-The-Beach in El Cerrito, California has three Laughing Sals. The first is a traditional-looking one from an amusement park in Ohio, suspected to be Idora Park. The second, known as Sinister Sal, was specially created by sculptor Chuck Jarman of Bump-in-The-Night Productions. The third, Psycho Sal, appears at Halloween season. All three models have been purchased by individual bidders from the auction that took place after Playland-Not-At-The-Beach closed - current whereabouts unknown.
- Revere Beach in Revere, Massachusetts, park closed, current location unknown
- Ripley's Believe it or Not Odditorium in Myrtle Beach, SC
- Riverview Park in Des Moines, Iowa (converted to Laffing Sam), closed in 1978, current location unknown
- Rocky Glen Park in Moosic, Pennsylvania (Commonly referred to as the "Laughing Lady"), park closed in 1987
- Santa Cruz Beach Boardwalk in California (from Playland at the Beach), still at the boardwalk and has been restored
- Savin Rock in West Haven, Connecticut Featured outside the "Death Valley" dark ride. (closed 1966)
- Seabreeze Amusement Park in Rochester, New York, was removed in the 1970s.
- Silver Beach Amusement Park and the new Silver Beach Carousel in St. Joseph, Michigan (this figure is a modern replication of the Laffin' Sal that used to be at Silver Beach Park)
- Waldameer & Water World in Erie, Pennsylvania had a dark ride in the 1940s that featured a "Laughing Sam" animatronic. The ride was removed in 1950.
