= FoolsFURY Theater =

Former ensemble theater company based in San Francisco

FoolsFURY Theater, stylized as foolsFURY or foolsFury, was an ensemble theater company based in San Francisco. Founded in 1998 by artistic director Ben Yalom, the company presented reworked Shakespeare and classical texts as well as new works by experimental contemporary playwrights, and specialized in physical theater techniques. Starting in 2002, it also presented a roughly biannual festival of experimental works, Fury Factory. The company was dissolved in late 2021.

== Productions ==
foolsFURY presented reworked classic texts including Shakespeare as well as new works by experimental contemporary playwrights. The company specialized in physical theater techniques such as Viewpoints, Suzuki, and Grotowski-based methods, were a training center for these techniques, and ran a youth program, Swivel Arts. Its mission statement included "[c]entering artists and voices from BIPOC and marginalized communities".

The company worked on new shows with playwrights including Sheila Callaghan, Doug Dorst, and Fabrice Melquiot and collaborated with theatrical innovators such as SITI Company, Mary Overlie, Stephen Wangh, and Corey Fischer.

foolsFURY also hosted a roughly biennial festival of experimental theater and works in progress called Fury Factory, which brought together a variety of US and foreign ensemble companies including Pig Iron, Banana Bag & Bodice, Witness Relocation, Under the Table, and Hand2Mouth.

== History ==
foolsFURY Theater was founded in 1998 by artistic director Ben Yalom. As of 2003, it employed 35 part-time actors.

A series of readings of works in progress took place in 2002. In 2005 this was replaced with the Fury Festival, which was then held approximately every two years, in 2007, 2009, 2011, 2014, 2016, and 2018.

In 2010, the company celebrated its 12th anniversary.

Debórah Eliezer, a long-time member of the company, was promoted in 2015 from associate artistic director to co-artistic director with Yalom. In 2020, Yalom stepped down and Eliezer succeeded him as artistic director.

foolsFURY was impacted by the COVID-19 shutdown in 2020, and in August that year the LNU Lightning Complex fires destroyed Eliezar and her husband's home in Venado, where they operated a retreat for the company and other artists. In 2021, she determined that resources were insufficient to hire an assistant director at an appropriate wage, and decided to close the company. A "wake" was held on November 20, 2021.
