= Sheila Callaghan =

American dramatist

- Callaghan in 2017
- Born: January 24, 1973 (age 53); Queens, New York
- Occupations: Playwright, screenwriter
- Spouse: Sophocles Papavasilopoulos
- Children: 1
- Writing career
- Period: Contemporary
- Website: www.sheilacallaghan.com

Sheila Callaghan (born January 24, 1973) is an American playwright and screenwriter who emerged from the RAT (Regional Alternative Theatre) movement of the 1990s. She has been profiled by American Theater Magazine, "The Brooklyn Rail", Theatermania, and The Village Voice. Her work has been published in American Theatre magazine.

In 2010, Callaghan was profiled by Marie Claire as one of "18 successful women who are changing the world." She was also named one of Variety magazine's "10 Screenwriters to Watch" of 2010. She was nominated for a 2016 Golden Globe Award for her work on the Hulu comedy series Casual, and a 2017 WGA nomination for her episode "I Am A Storm" from Season 7 of the comedy/drama series Shameless.

== Style ==
Callaghan's writing has been described as "comically engaging, subversively penetrating", "whimsically eloquent", "unique and completely contemporary", and "downright weird". The New York Times has said Callaghan "writes with a world-weary tone and has a poet's gift for economical description," and the Philadelphia Weekly has called Callaghan a "provocative playwright" with a "national following" who "creates work that's realistic and unpredictable, dark and funny, reassuring and disturbing."

== Memberships ==
Callaghan is a founding member of feminist advocacy group The Kilroys, who created the Kilroys' List. She is also a founding member of the playwrights' collective 13P and an alumni member of New Dramatists.

== Awards and honors ==
Callaghan is the recipient of several writing awards, including the 2000 Princess Grace Award, the 2014 Ted Schmitt Award for the world premiere of an outstanding new play by the Los Angeles Drama Critics Circle, and the 2007 Whiting Award for Drama. She also won a Robert Chesley Award from Publishing Triangle in 2002. In 2007, her play Dead City won a Special Commendation Award for the prestigious Susan Smith Blackburn Prize.

She has also received a Jerome Fellowship from the Playwrights' Center, a MacDowell Colony Fellowship, a grant from New York Foundation for the Arts, and a New York State Council on the Arts grant.

== Teaching ==
Callaghan has taught playwriting and English at the University of Rochester, The College of New Jersey, Spalding University, Brooklyn College, LaGuardia Community College, and Florida State University.

== Personal ==
She is married to composer and producer Sophocles Papavasilopoulos, with whom she has a son.

== Plays by Sheila Callaghan ==
Her most well-known play to date is Women Laughing Alone With Salad, which was featured on The Kilroys' List in 2014. Her other plays have been produced and developed with Soho Rep, Playwrights Horizons, The Flea Theater, South Coast Repertory, Clubbed Thumb, The LARK, PlayPenn, Collision Theatre Company, Actor's Theatre of Louisville, New Georges, the Bloomington Playwrights Project, Theatre of NOTE, Impact Theatre, foolsFURY Theater Rattlestick Playwrights Theater and Moving Arts, among others.

Internationally, her plays have been produced in New Zealand, Norway, Germany, Portugal, and the Czech Republic. She has been commissioned by Playwrights Horizons, South Coast Repertory, and the Ensemble Studio Theatre.

Several of her plays are published by Playscripts, Inc., Samuel French Inc., and S. Fischer Verlag (in German translation), and she has been anthologized in the New York Theatre Review and others. A collection of her plays was published in 2011 by Soft Skull Press.

List of long plays:

- Scab
- Lascivious Something
- Dead City
- Crumble (Lay Me Down, Justin Timberlake) (originally produced by Clubbed Thumb)
- Crawl, Fade to White
- Kate Crackernuts
- Star-Crossed Lovers
- We Are Not These Hands
- Fever/Dream
- That Pretty Pretty (Or, The Rape Play) (originally produced by Rattlestick Playwrights Theater)
- Roadkill Confidential (originally produced by Clubbed Thumb)
- Everything You Touch
- Port Out, Starboard Home (created with FoolsFURY Theater and produced by La MaMa Experimental Theatre Club)
- Elevada (originally produced by Yale Repertory Theatre)
- Bed
- Women Laughing Alone With Salad (originally produced by Woolly Mammoth Theatre Company)
- (Not) The Water Project

List of short plays:

- New Shoes
- Tumor
- American Jack
- Blue Lila Rising
- Ayravana Flies or A Pretty Dish
- The Transit Plays
- He Ate the Sun
- Soak
- Hold This

Other:

- (contribution to:) Uncle Sam's Satiric Spectacular: a vaudevillean collaboration

== Film and television ==
Callaghan is a writer/producer on the hit FX series Dying For Sex starring Michelle Williams and Jenny Slate. She was also a writer/producer on the Showtime series Shameless for six seasons, United States of Tara for two, and the Hulu comedy series Casual for one. Her pilot Over/Under was filmed for the USA Network, starring Steven Pasquale and Caroline Dhavernas.

== See also ==
- The Biology of Luck
