= Playland (San Francisco) =

Amusement park in California, 1921 to 1972

- Previously known as: Mooneysville-by-the-Sea; Chutes at the Beach; Playland at the Beach; Whitney's Playland
- Playland in 1918

- Location within San Francisco County Location within California Location within the United States
- Location: Ocean Beach San Francisco, California
- Coordinates: 37°46′24″N 122°30′43″W
- Status: Defunct
- Opened: 1913
- Closed: 1972
- Area: 10 acres (40,000 m^{2})

Playland (also known as Playland-at-the-Beach and Whitney's Playland, beginning in 1928 – some say 1926) was a 10-acre (40,000-square-meter) seaside amusement park located next to Ocean Beach, in the Richmond District on the West Side of San Francisco, California, along Great Highway, bounded by Balboa and Fulton streets. It began as a collection of amusement rides and concessions in the late 19th century, and was preceded by Chutes at the Beach, opened in 1921. Playland closed Labor Day weekend in 1972.

== History ==
=== Before Playland ===
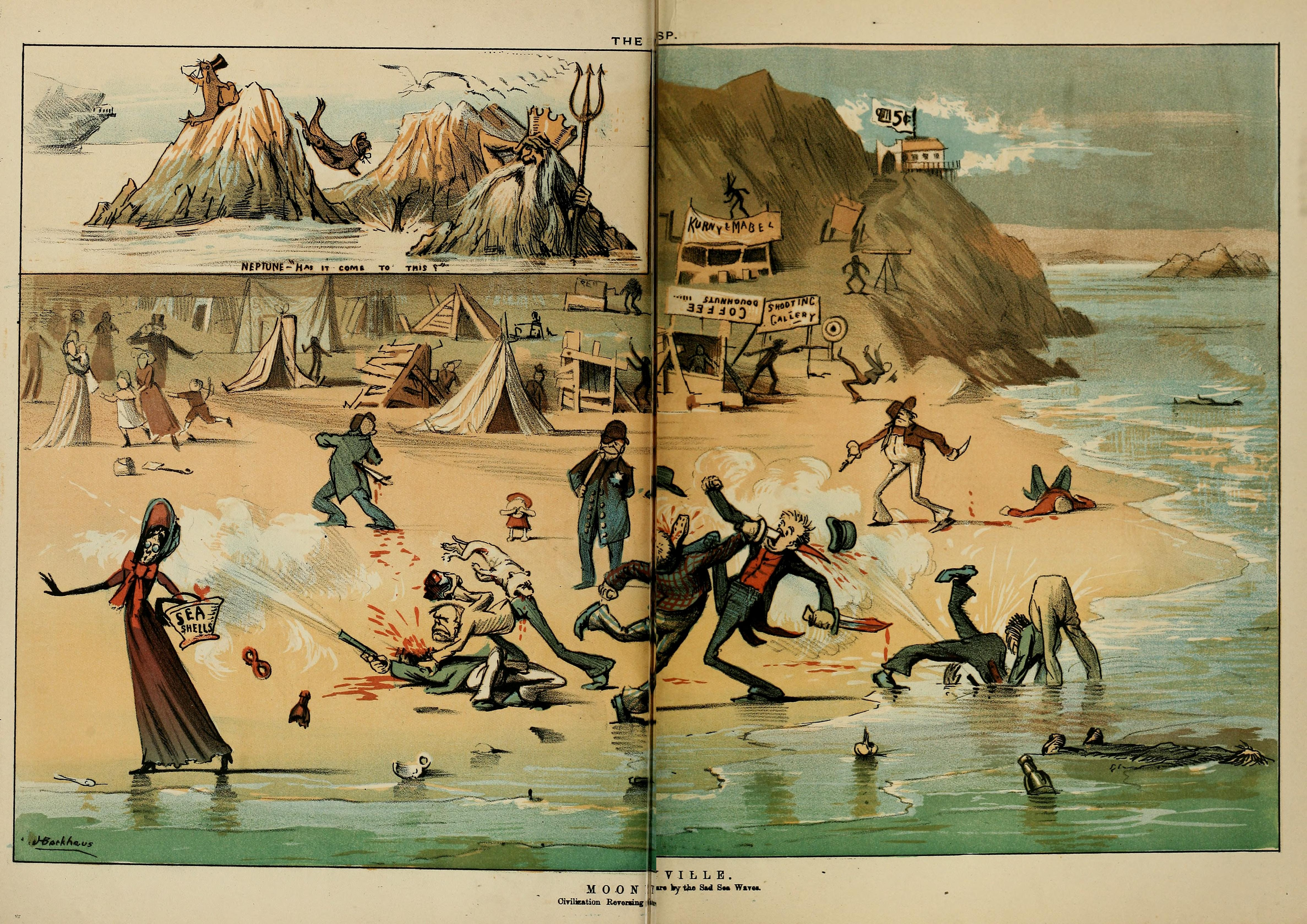
A satirical depiction of Mooneysville by Henry Barkhaus published in The Wasp, January 26, 1884

The area that was Playland began as a 19th-century squatter's settlement, "Mooneysville-by-the-Sea," named for Workingmen's Party orator Con Mooney. By 1884, a steam railroad was in place to bring people to the first amusement ride at the city’s ocean side — a "Gravity Railroad" roller coaster, and to the Ocean Beach Pavilion for concerts and dancing. By 1890, trolley lines reached Ocean Beach — the Ferries and Cliff House Railroad, the Park and Ocean Railroad, and the Sutro Railroad — that encouraged commercial amusement development as a trolley park. The Cliff House, which opened in 1863, and Sutro Baths, which opened in 1896, drew thousands of visitors.

The rides and attractions that began to spring up along the beach were separately owned by various concessionaires. For example, John Friedle owned a shooting gallery and baseball-throwing concession. All of the rides at Chutes at the Beach were purchased new or built there, including the Shoot-the-Chutes, which inspired the first official name for the amusement area — Chutes at the Beach.

Around 1913, Arthur Looff leased a piece of land for a carousel and its house — the Looff Hippodrome, located next to John Friedle's concessions. Friedle and Looff became partners in Looff’s Hippodrome and began to buy other concessions to realize their vision of creating "the grandest amusement park on the Pacific coast." By 1921, they had ten rides, including the Shoot-the-Chutes. A writer for the San Francisco Chronicle in 1922 reported that “by 1921 the owners had spent $150,000 to produce ten spectacular new rides ("clean, safe, moral attractions") which were open from noon to midnight, everyday.” Attractions included Arthur Looff’s Bob Sled Dipper roller coaster, also known as "the Bobs" (1921), the Looff-designed Big Dipper roller coaster (1922), Shoot-the-Chutes, the carousel, Aeroplane Swing, the Whip, Dodg 'Em, the Ship of Joy, the Ferris wheel, Noah’s Ark, and almost a hundred concessionaires.

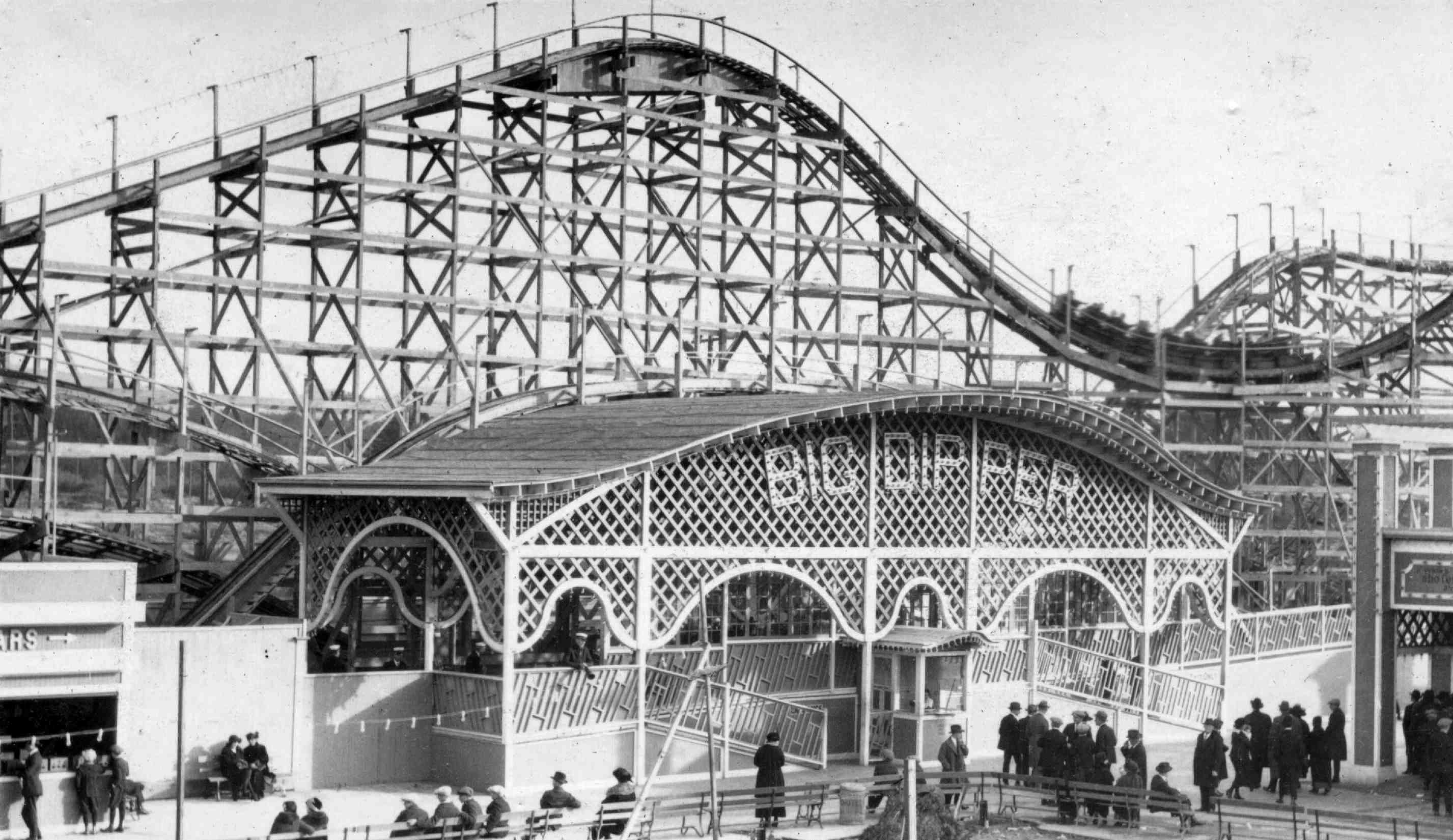
Playland's Big Dipper c. 1920s

In 1923, George and Leo Whitney hit town. The Whitney brothers opened a photographic concession that year, pioneering a fast photo-finishing process that allowed people to take pictures home rather than having to wait days for the film to be developed and images printed. By 1924, the Whitney brothers owned four shooting galleries and a souvenir shop in addition to the quick-photo studio.

=== Playland ===
In 1926, George Whitney became general manager of the growing complex of seaside attractions and changed the name to Playland-at-the-Beach, also sometimes known as Whitney's at the Beach. Although the attractions continued to be operated as independent concessionaires, during the late 1920s and 1930s, especially during the Depression when concessions began to fail, George and Leo began to purchase the attractions outright. The Whitneys bought the roller coaster in 1936 and the merry-go-round in 1942. Playland took up three city blocks and, in 1934, the Midway had 14 rides, 25 concessions, and four restaurants besides Topsy's Roost.

Although Playland's attractions originally sat upon leased land, the Whitneys eventually purchased the land beneath Playland, as well as several adjacent lots for future expansion. In 1937, George Whitney Sr. purchased the then-vacant Cliff House from the Sutro estate and reopened it as an upscale roadhouse that same year. George Whitney was called “The Barnum of the Golden Gate” as he went on to buy up the concessions and even bought the Sutro Baths in 1952. He bought out his brother in 1952 and continued to operate the area on his own until he died in 1958.

Despite this expansion, the post-war years saw the tearing down of the Shoot the Chutes in 1950 and the Big Dipper in 1955, and after George Whitney died in 1958, Playland was never quite the same. For a while after George Whitney's death, Playland was operated by his son, George K. Whitney Jr., and then by prolific developer Bob Fraser, responsible for more than 30 major projects, many significantly altering skylines in San Francisco. It was eventually sold to Jeremy Ets-Hokin (a millionaire developer) in 1971 and torn down on September 4, 1972. Condominiums were completed on the Playland property in 1982 and 1983, and a permanent art project commemorating Playland was installed in 1996.

== Attractions ==
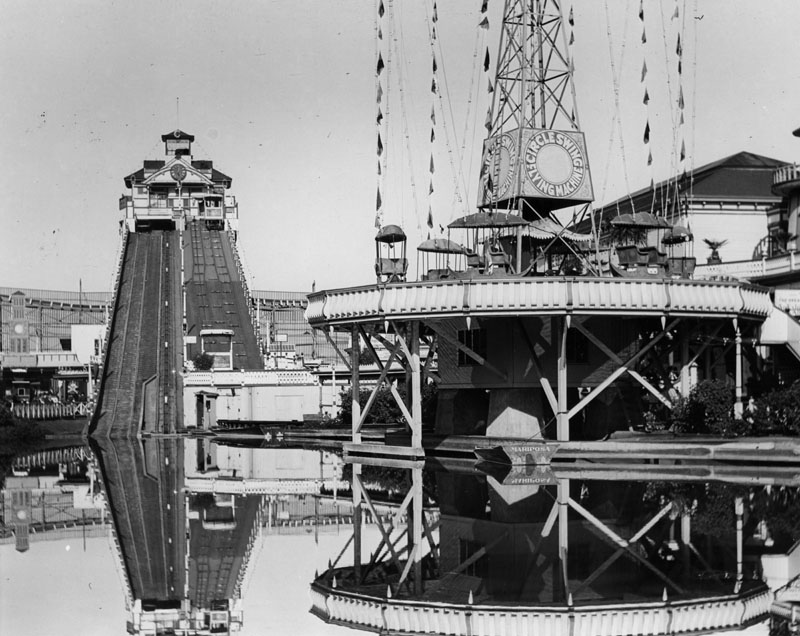
The Shoot-the-chutes

By 1922, the attractions included Arthur Looff’s “Bob Sled Dipper” (the Bobs) (1921), the Looff-designed Big Dipper (1922), the Shoot-the-chutes, the carousel, Aeroplane Swing, The Whip, Dodg 'Em, the Ship of Joy, the Ferris wheel, Noah’s Ark, and almost 100 concessionaires.

At various times, the rides at Playland included: Skyliner, Rocketship, Big Dipper, Big Slide, Dodg 'Em (bumper cars), Limbo (dark house), Kookie Kube, Dark Mystery (which started as an African-themed dark ride but was redone in the 1950s with a Dali-esque surrealistic facade), the Mad Mine (a dark ride that literally covered over Dark Mystery), Scrambler, Twister, and Kiddie Bulgy. Another favorite was the Diving Bell, a metal chamber that took guests under water and then returned them to the surface with a big splash. This ride originated at the 1939-40 Golden Gate Exposition on Treasure Island. George Whitney commissioned the inventor to build another one at Playland on the southeast block of the park. After a decade, the attraction was rebuilt on the northwest block, where it remained until Playland's closing in 1972.

=== Carousel ===
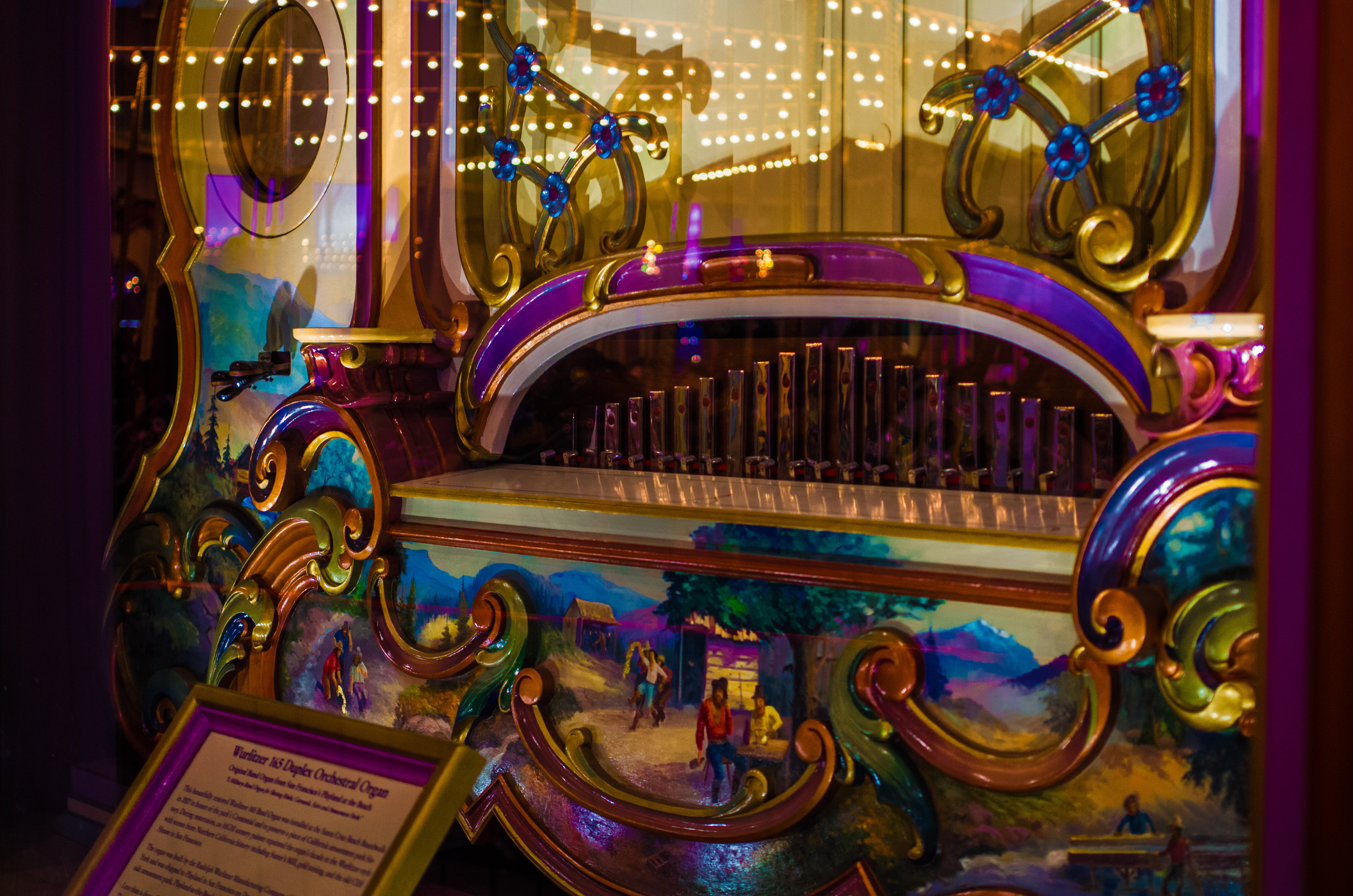
Carousel organ, now at the Santa Cruz Beach Boardwalk

Arthur Looff actually commissioned the carousel in 1904 for a little amusement park that was originally on Market and Van Ness in San Francisco, but because of the earthquake in 1906, the carousel was shipped to Luna Park, Seattle, Washington. It was not until 1913 that Looff leased land for the carousel and its house, the Looff Hippodrome, that the carousel came to Playland. Looff’s Hippodrome at Chutes-at-the-Beach was the first permanently installed concession in 1914. The carousel was an elegant 68-horse merry-go-round with a $5,000 organ (an astonishingly large sum at the time). The Playland 1914 Wurlitzer 165 band organ can be seen and heard at the Santa Cruz Beach Boardwalk's 1911 Looff carousel house, along with the Boardwalk's original 1894 Ruth & Sohn Band Organ.

The carousel was sold at the Playland auction in 1972 to a private collector and stored in Roswell, New Mexico, for restoration until 1984, when it was sold to the city of Long Beach, California. San Francisco bought the carousel in 1998, and it is now located off Fourth Street downtown in Yerba Buena Gardens.

=== Fun House ===
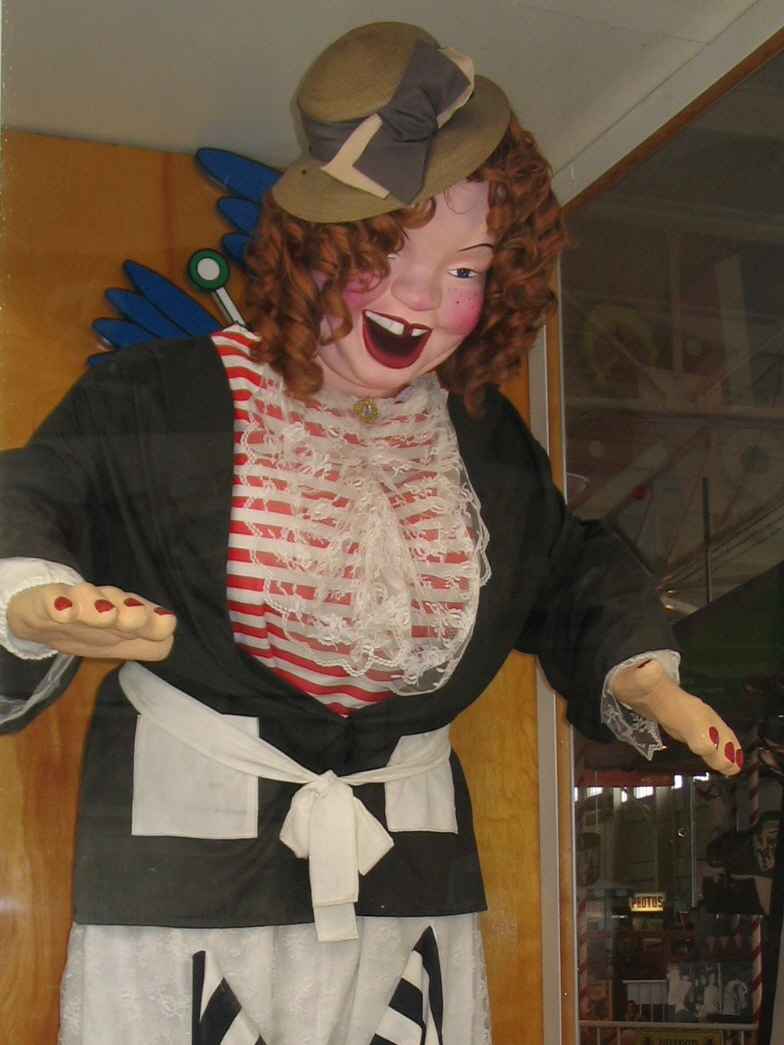
Laffing Sal at the Musée Mécanique

Among the more popular concessions was the Fun House, originally called the Bug House, erected in 1923–24. Laffing Sal was the laughing automated character whose cackle echoed throughout the park. After Playland was closed, Laffing Sal, one of the first animatrons, was relocated to the Santa Cruz Beach Boardwalk. The Laffing Sal from the Fun House is now located in the Musée Mécanique in San Francisco. The last remaining Walking Charley figure is located at Playland-Not-At-The-Beach.

Patrons entered by first passing through a mirror maze which had originally been a separate attraction on the opposite side of the midway. Next, patrons squeezed through the spin-dryers and entered the main area of the Fun House, which contained a Joy Wheel (flat wooden disc that spun quickly and forced kids to slide off), the Barrel of Laughs (rotating walk-through wooden barrel), the Moving Bridges (connected gang planks that went up and down), and the Rocking Horses (attached by strong springs to a moving platform creating quite a galloping sensation). The Fun House had air jets, rickety catwalks, steep, moving and rocking staircases, the topsy-turvy barrel, and the three-story climb up to the top of "the longest, bumpiest indoor slide in the world," and a 200-foot (61 m) indoor slide. The Santa Cruz Boardwalk had a funhouse with an identical interior (but not exterior) until it was remodeled in 1983.

The famous funhouse mirror sequence at the end of Orson Welles's The Lady from Shanghai (1948) was filmed in Hollywood, but in the last moments of the movie, the exterior shot of Welles walking past the funhouse was filmed at Playland. Laffing Sal is nowhere to be seen because curtains hide her on the second floor bay window above Welles' head. In the background as Welles crosses the street, the Laff in the Dark is clearly visible. The name on the Fun House was changed to "Crazy House" during the filming of this sequence.

=== Fun-Tier Town ===
Playland also included a “Fun-tier” Town for “little western gals and little cowboys,” which was an area with ten rides geared for children with a western motif and a place for birthday parties. "Fun-Tier" Town sat on the land where the Laff in the Dark attraction had been for decades.

=== Camera obscura ===
Camera Obscura was built and in place at the lower terrace of the Cliff House in 1946. Also referred to as Giant Camera by a sign on the south side of the camera-shaped building, Camera Obscura and Holograph Gallery (sign above entrance) was added to the National Register of Historic Places (locally) in 2001 for its engineering significance, "since it retains its original projection table, lens, and mirror and continues to operate in the same manner as it did in 1946."

== Roller coasters ==
- Figure-8—Opened 1920, demolished and replaced by the Big Dipper July 1922. A soon-outdated side-friction roller coaster with three levels.
- Bob Sled Dipper—Opened 1921, demolished 1929. The Bob Sled Dipper (or Bobs) was a state-of-the-art toboggan-style coaster ride with rides seated in tandem in two-passenger cars strung eight to a train. It was closed in 1929 after an accident that caused injuries to seven passengers; two were severe. The accident may have precipitated the transfer of the park from John Friedle to the Whitney Brothers. This ride was also called The Grizzly.
- Big Dipper—Opened 1922. It was supposedly a Prior & Church design built by Arthur Looff, and it lasted 33 years, being demolished in 1956. It had a "gut-wrenching 80-foot drop." A man was thrown from this ride and killed.
- Sleigh Ride.
- Alpine Racer—Operative 1959–72. It was situated on the southeast corner of Playland's south block, but the area was closed in 1964 or 1965, and the Racer stood idle for about a year until it was moved to the northwest corner of the main block. This was a German-made wild mouse ride imported by Mack Duce's Export Sales Corporation.

== Topsy's Roost ==
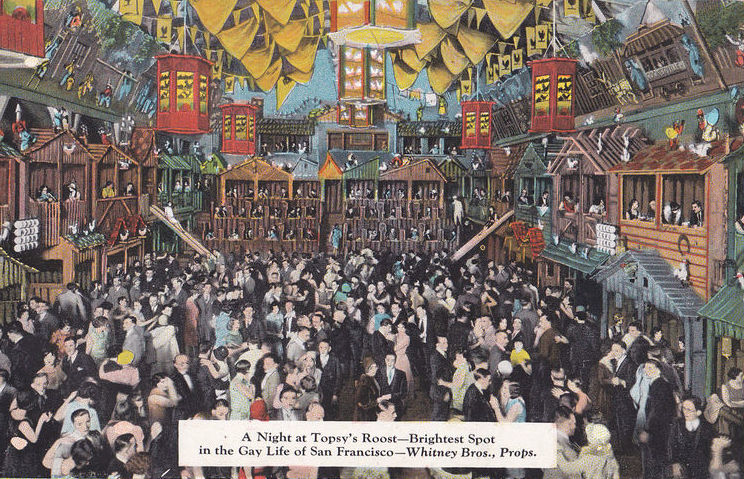
Topsy's Roost Restaurant postcard

In 1929, George Whitney relocated Topsy's Roost, a popular restaurant specializing in chicken, which had been established two years previously at the south end of the esplanade. He moved the business into the former Ocean Beach Pavilion just north of Playland at the foot of Sutro Heights. The ballroom had been constructed in 1884–85. Driving south along the beach on the Great Highway from the Cliff House, the first building you came to was Topsy’s Roost, which became more than just a chicken dinner house—it was also a popular nightclub. It had a live orchestra and dance floor and was decorated so it looked like the patrons were sitting in ramshackle chicken coops. There was seating on the main floor around the dance floor as well as the balcony. Patrons sitting on the balcony level could slide from their coops down to the dance floor if they wanted to dance. The restaurant was named for Topsy, a character in Harriet Beecher Stowe's Uncle Tom's Cabin and its decor depicted Negro stereotypes. All workers were African American, except for management.

By the mid-1930s, Whitney decided to close Topsy’s Roost, focusing instead on the Cliff House restaurant. The Topsy's Roost building later became the site of the Edgewater Ballroom, a slot car raceway, the second home of Chet Helm's Family Dog Productions, and lastly, the Friends and Relations Hall. In 1947, Skateland, a roller rink, was built on an empty lot where an annex of the Ocean Beach Pavilion once stood.

== Food ==
The It's-It ice cream sandwich was invented in 1928 by George Whitney and was sold only at Playland-at-the-Beach until its demolition in 1972. Later, It's-It was made and sold elsewhere, located since 1976 in Burlingame, California, and currently sold in stores in about 15 states.

== See also ==
- Playland-Not-At-The-Beach amusement museum opened June 2008 and closed in 2018 in El Cerrito, California, to celebrate Playland-at-the-Beach.
- List of defunct amusement parks
- The Chutes of San Francisco
