= Basetrack Live =

Basetrack Live is a theatrical collaboration between theatre company En Garde Arts and corpsmen and families of the 1st Battalion/8th Marines.

== Details ==
The production premiered in Austin, Texas on September 11, 2014, and is touring to more than 20 cities across the US, including the Brooklyn Academy of Music on Veterans Day 2014. A multimedia theatrical experience, the piece is drawn entirely from verbatim text about the impact of war on veterans, their families and communities. Live music, images from independent photojournalists taken during the War in Afghanistan and post-deployment filmed interviews are woven throughout the performed narrative of a young Marine and his wife.

The production was inspired by an original, online citizen journalism project called One-Eight Basetrack. Created by the nonprofit organization November Eleven, and funded by a News Challenge grant from the Knight Foundation, this project was launched by Teru Kuwayama and a team of photojournalists embedded with the 1st Battalion/8th Marines in southern Afghanistan.

Anne Hamburger, Executive Producer and founder of En Garde Arts, became interested in the project after seeing a performance at the launch of the Center for Innovation in the Arts at The Juilliard School. Hamburger assembled a creative team to develop the piece into a full-length work and mounted a national tour. In addition, Hamburger developed a range of initiatives to bring together veterans and members of the military community with a traditional theatre-going audience - two constituencies rarely, if ever, in conversation.

Basetrack Live, created by Edward Bilous, music direction by Michelle DiBucci, directed by Seth Bockley, co-adapted by Jason Grote with Seth Bockley and Anne Hamburger. Music Co-Composed by Edward Bilous, Michelle DiBucci and Greg Kalember. Anne Hamburger, Executive Producer, Portia Kamons, Producer (Inspired by the website One-Eight Basetrack, a citizen journalism project featuring the work of Teru Kuwayama, Balazs Gardi and Tivadar Domaniczky).

== Original cast and company ==
- Performance technology designer – William David Fastenow
- Video & projection designer – Sarah Outwaithe
- Video editor – Esteban Uribe
- Music direction – Michelle DiBucci
- Lighting design – Paul Hudson
- Set design – Caleb Wertenbaker
- Costume design – Claudia Brown
- Production stage management – Heather Patterson
- Production manager – Nicholas Lazarro
- General manager – Andrea Nellis
- Tour booking – Thomas O. Kreigsman/ArKtype
- Producer/director of development – Portia Kamons
- Executive producer – Anne Hamburger

== Original cast and the Basetrack Band ==
- AJ Czubai – Tyler La Marr
- Melissa Czubai – Ashley Bloom
- Wives interviews – Kimberly Gonzalez & Medike Weber (Espinal)
- Cello – Trevor Exter
- DJ/VJ/trumpet – Kenneth Rodriguez
- Violin – Mazz Swift
- Drums/piano – Daniele Cavalca
- Cello – Ana Lenchantin
