= Charlotte Salomon =

German painter (1917–1943)

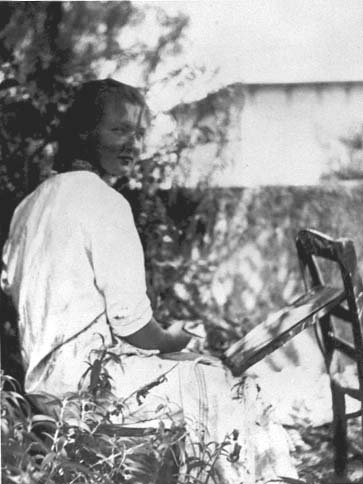
- Charlotte Salomon painting in the garden of the Villa L'Ermitage, Villefranche-sur-Mer, about 1939
- Born: 16 April 1917; Berlin, German Empire
- Died: 10 October 1943 (aged 26); Auschwitz-Birkenau, German-occupied Poland
- Resting place: 50.034752°N 19.175804°E
- Notable work: Leben? oder Theater?: Ein Singspiel
- Movement: Expressionism
- Spouse: Alexander Nagler
- Father: Albert Salomon

Charlotte Salomon (16 April 1917 – 10 October 1943) was a German-Jewish artist born in Berlin. She is primarily remembered as the creator of an autobiographical series of paintings Leben? oder Theater?: Ein Singspiel (Life? or Theater?: A Song-play), the largest known artwork made by a Jewish person who died in the Holocaust, consisting of 769 individual works painted between 1941 and 1943 in the south of France, while Salomon was in hiding from the Nazis. In October 1943 Salomon, 5 months pregnant at that time, was captured and deported to Auschwitz, where she was murdered by the Nazis soon after her arrival. In 2015, a 35-page confession by Salomon to the fatal poisoning of her grandfather, kept secret for decades, was released by a Parisian publisher.

== Biography ==
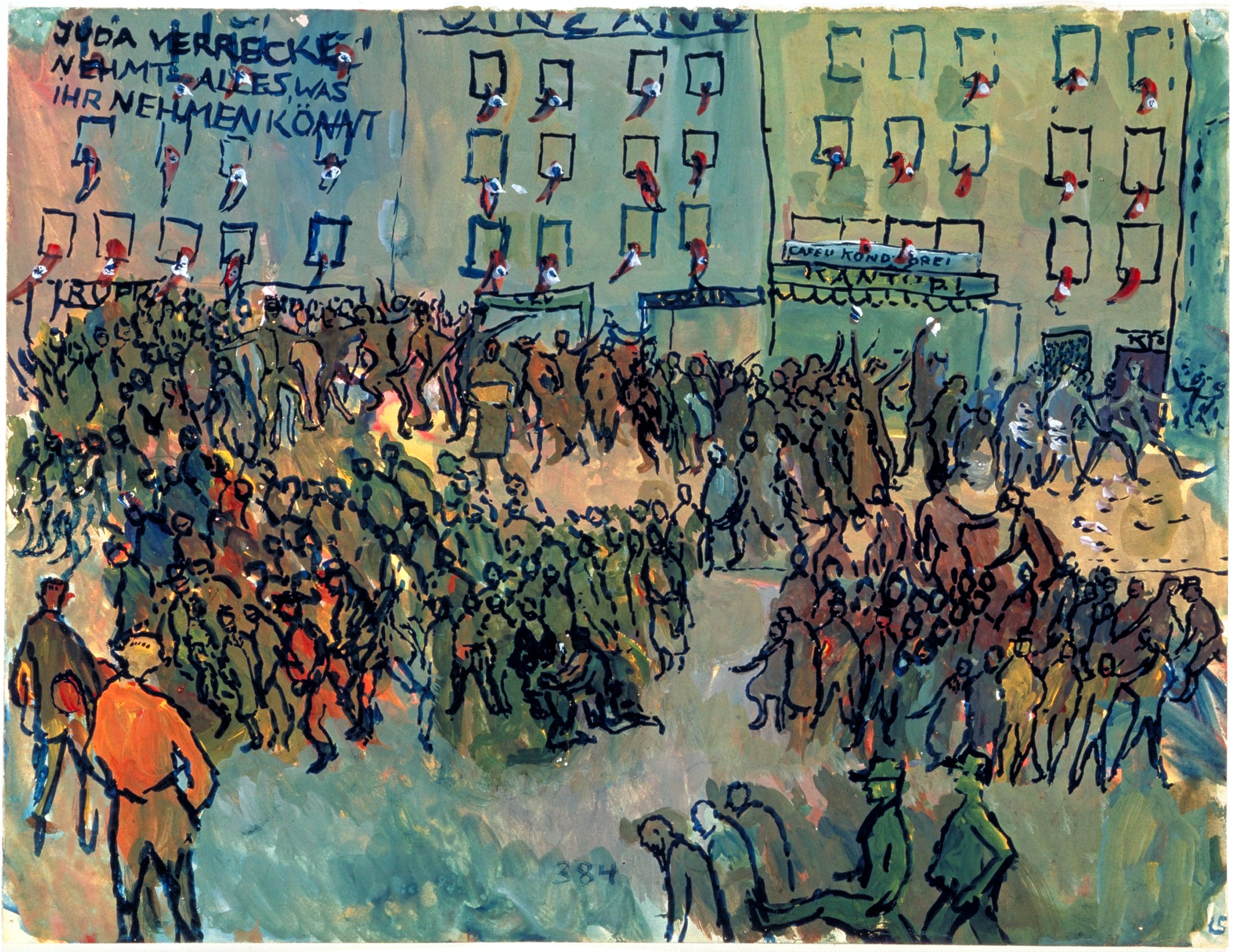
Kristallnacht, 1940–42

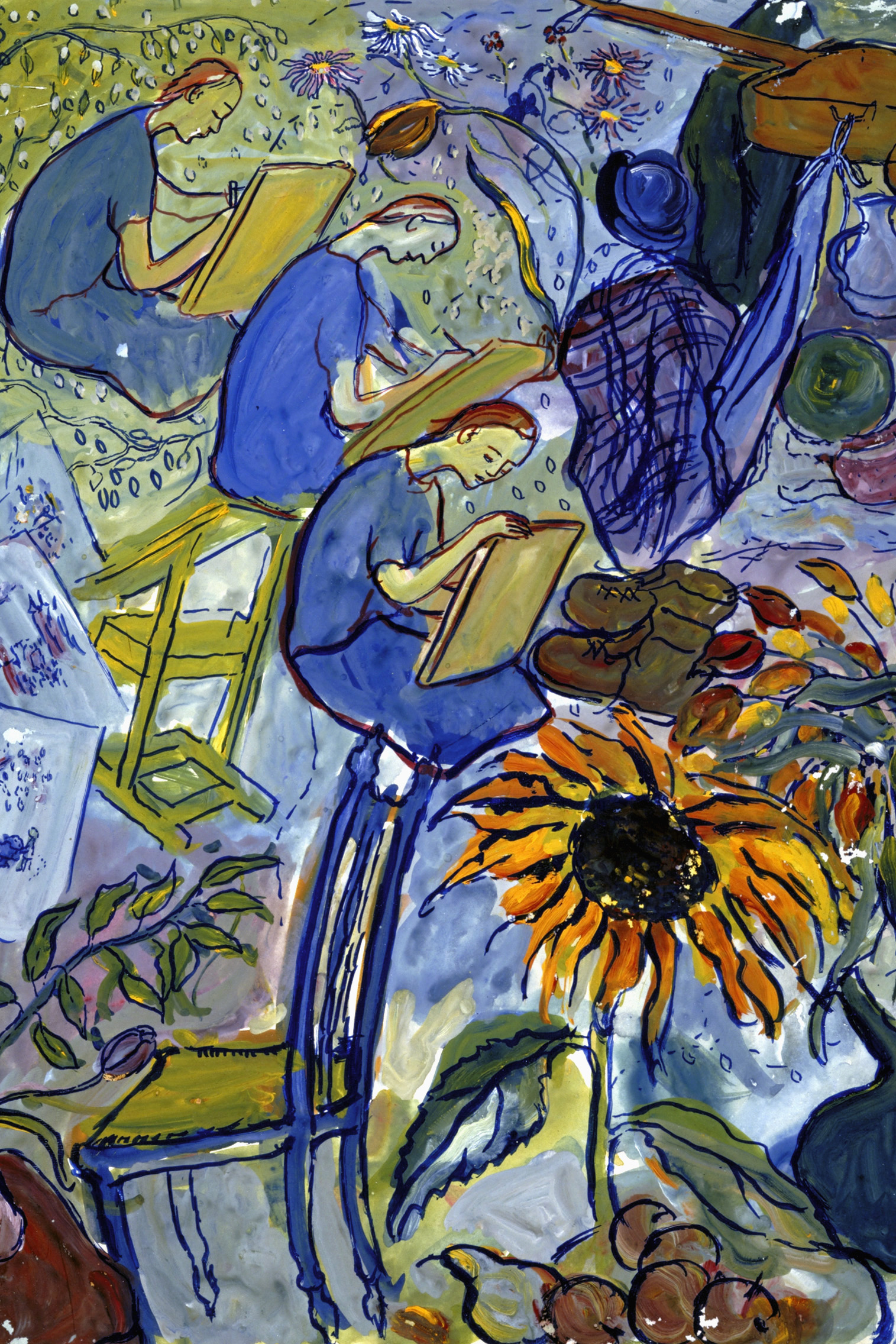
Charlotte Salomon, gouache from Life? or Theater?, 1940–42

Charlotte Salomon came from a prosperous Berlin family. Her father, Albert Salomon was a surgeon; her mother, Franziska (Grünwald), sensitive and troubled, committed suicide when Charlotte was eight or nine, though she was led to believe her mother died from influenza. Charlotte was sixteen when the Nazis came to power in 1933. She simply refused to go to school, and stayed at home.

At a time when German universities were restricting their Jewish student quota to 1.5% of the student body (providing their fathers had served on the front line in the First World War), Salomon succeeded in gaining admission to the Vereinigte Staatsschulen für freie und angewandte Kunst (United State Schools for Pure and Applied Arts) in 1936. She studied painting there for two years, but by summer 1938 the antisemitic policy of Hitler's Third Reich meant that it was too dangerous for her to continue attending the college and she did not return, despite winning a prize.

Salomon's father was briefly interned in Sachsenhausen concentration camp in November 1938, after Kristallnacht, and the Salomon family decided to leave Germany. Charlotte was sent to the South of France to live with her grandparents, already settled in Villefranche-sur-Mer near Nice. They lived in a cottage in the grounds of a luxurious villa L'Ermitage (now demolished) owned by a wealthy American, Ottilie Moore, who went on to shelter a number of Jewish children. Salomon left L'Ermitage with her grandparents to live in an apartment in Nice, where her grandmother attempted to hang herself in the bathroom. Her grandfather then revealed the truth to Charlotte about her mother's suicide, as well as the suicides of her aunt Charlotte, her great-grandmother, her great-uncle, and her grandmother's nephew. Shortly after the outbreak of war in September 1939, Charlotte's grandmother succeeded in taking her own life. Her grandmother had stockpiled Veronal and morphine for when the German army arrived, but when she was denied access to her medication, she instead tried to hang herself before killing herself by jumping out a window.

Charlotte and her grandfather were interned by the French authorities in a bleak camp in the Pyrenees called Gurs. Charlotte recalls in Life? or Theater? that spending a night in a crowded train is preferable to spending one night with her grandfather: "I'd rather have ten more nights like this than a single one alone with him." His constant request to share his bed with her and her own words in a confession letter of 35 pages, made public in 2015, suggest sexual abuse.

They were released on account of her grandfather's infirmity. Her grandfather returned to his life in Nice, while in Villefranche, Salomon experienced a nervous breakdown that stemmed from her grandfather’s revelations and her disgust for him. The local doctor, Dr. George Morridis, advised her to paint.

Salomon rented a room in the pension La Belle Aurore in Saint-Jean-Cap-Ferrat, and there she commenced the work that would outlive her. She began her series of 769 paintings – entitled Life? or Theater? – by stating that she was driven by "the question: whether to take her own life or undertake something wildly unusual". In the space of two years, she painted more than one thousand gouaches. She edited the paintings, re-arranged them, and added texts, captions, and overlays. She had a habit of humming songs to herself while painting. The entire work was a slightly fantastic autobiography preserving the main events of her life – her mother's death, studying art in the shadow of the Third Reich, her relationship with her grandparents – but altering the names and employing a strong element of fantasy. She also added notes about appropriate music to increase the dramatic effect, and she called Life? or Theater? a "Singespiel", [sic] or lyrical drama.

In 1942, Salomon, whose residence permit depended upon her caretaking of her grandfather, joined her grandfather in Nice. Soon after, she poisoned him with a homemade veronal omelette. The event is detailed in a 35-page illustrated confessional letter Salomon addressed to her former lover Alfred Wolfsohn, who never received the letter.

In 1943, as the Nazis intensified their search for Jews living in the South of France, Salomon handed the work to a local Villefranche doctor she was acquainted with, and addressed it to Ottilie Moore—the German-American millionaire who owned the villa Salomon was hiding in at the time. She inscribed Moore's name at the top, and told the doctor: "Keep this safe, it is my whole life." Moore, who passed on the package to Charlotte's remaining family, only received the package upon her return to Europe in 1947, after the war's end.

By September 1943, Salomon had married another German Jewish refugee, Alexander Nagler. The two of them were dragged from their house and transported by rail from Nice to the Nazi "processing centre" at Drancy near Paris. By now, Salomon was five months pregnant. She was transported to Auschwitz on 7 October 1943 and was probably murdered in the gas chamber on the same day that she arrived there, 10 October.

== Life? or Theater? (Leben? oder Theater?) ==
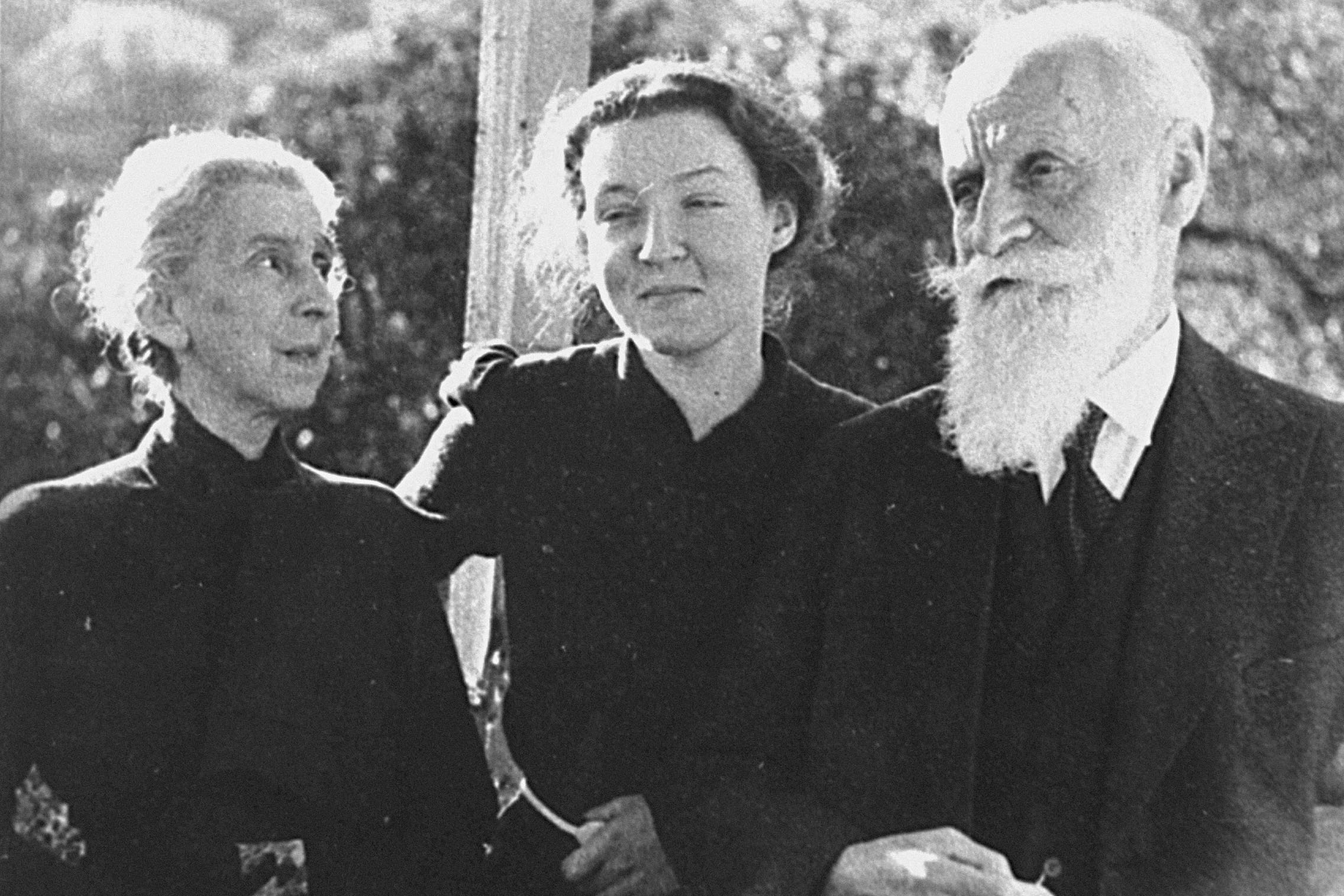
Charlotte and her grandparents

A large part of Life? or Theater? is about her obsession with Amadeus Daberlohn, a voice teacher she met through her stepmother Paulinka Bimbam (Salomon gives all her characters humorous, often punning, pseudonyms). These sections are honest and compelling accounts of her passionate relationship with Alfred Wolfsohn – the one person who took her artistic work seriously. It is not possible to know if Salomon's version of her relationship with Wolfsohn corresponds with reality, but he was undoubtedly her first love.

In 1943, when she was 26, Charlotte Salomon gave her collection of paintings to Dr. Moridis, a trusted friend who had counseled her through her depression.

Life? or Theater? is intended as a Gesamtkunstwerk, a Wagnerian 'total work of art' within the tradition of the ambitious nineteenth-century German idea to fuse poetry, music and the visual arts. Yet Salomon's work is a reversal of that tradition which was intended to be the ultimate manifestation of Germanic culture – instead it is a work created by a "young woman who belonged to a supposedly alien race and who was therefore held not to even have a right to exist, let alone a place in society."

=== Transparencies ===
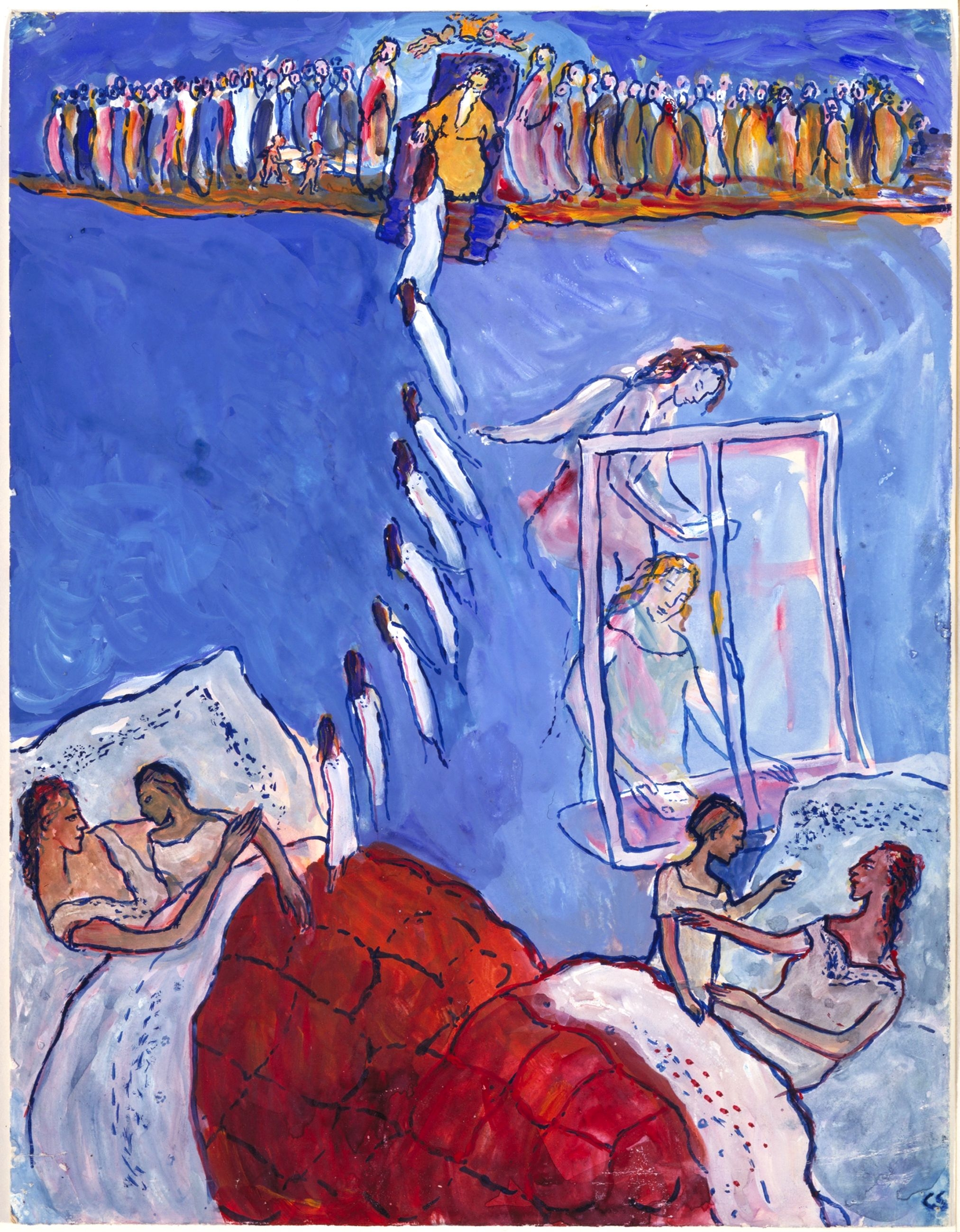
Gouache

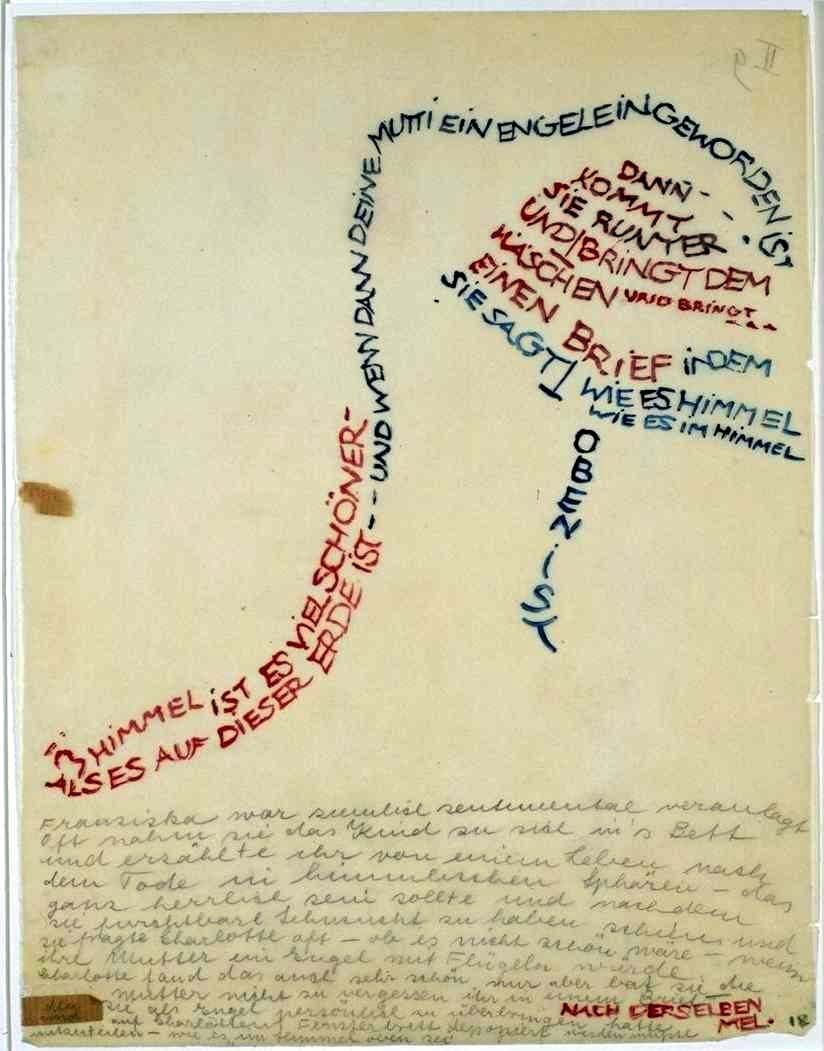
Transparent overlay

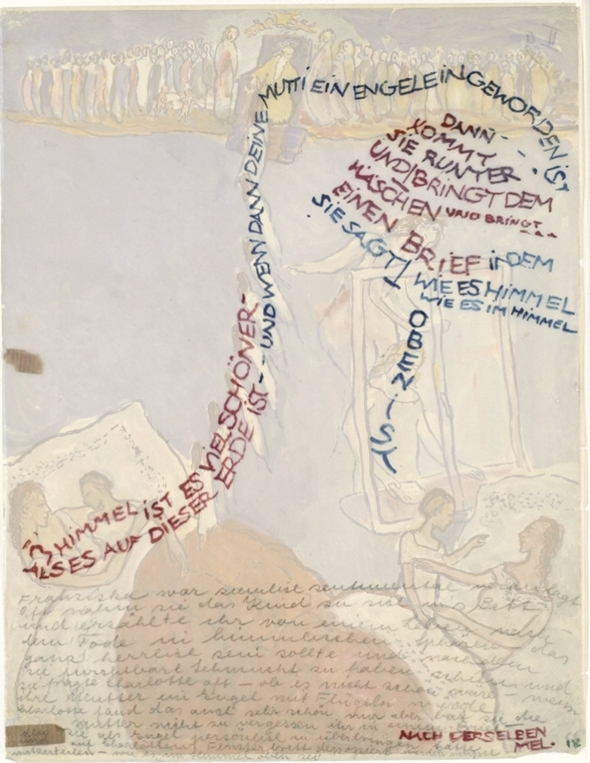
Combined image

The work includes some two hundred transparencies carrying text intended to overlay their associated gouaches. The examples illustrated are typical. It is the closing gouache of Scene 1 of the Prelude and depicts the fictional Charlotte Kann (representing Salomon herself) in bed with her mother Franziska, who is telling Charlotte how wonderful it is in Heaven and how one day she (Franziska) will go there and turn into an angel and leave a letter for Charlotte on her windowsill describing life in Heaven.

=== Signature image ===
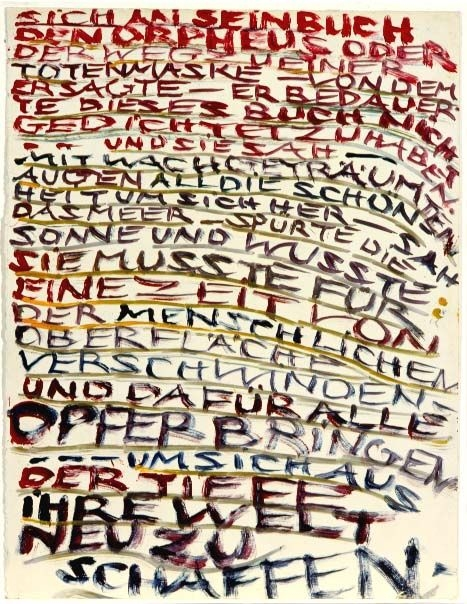
Text

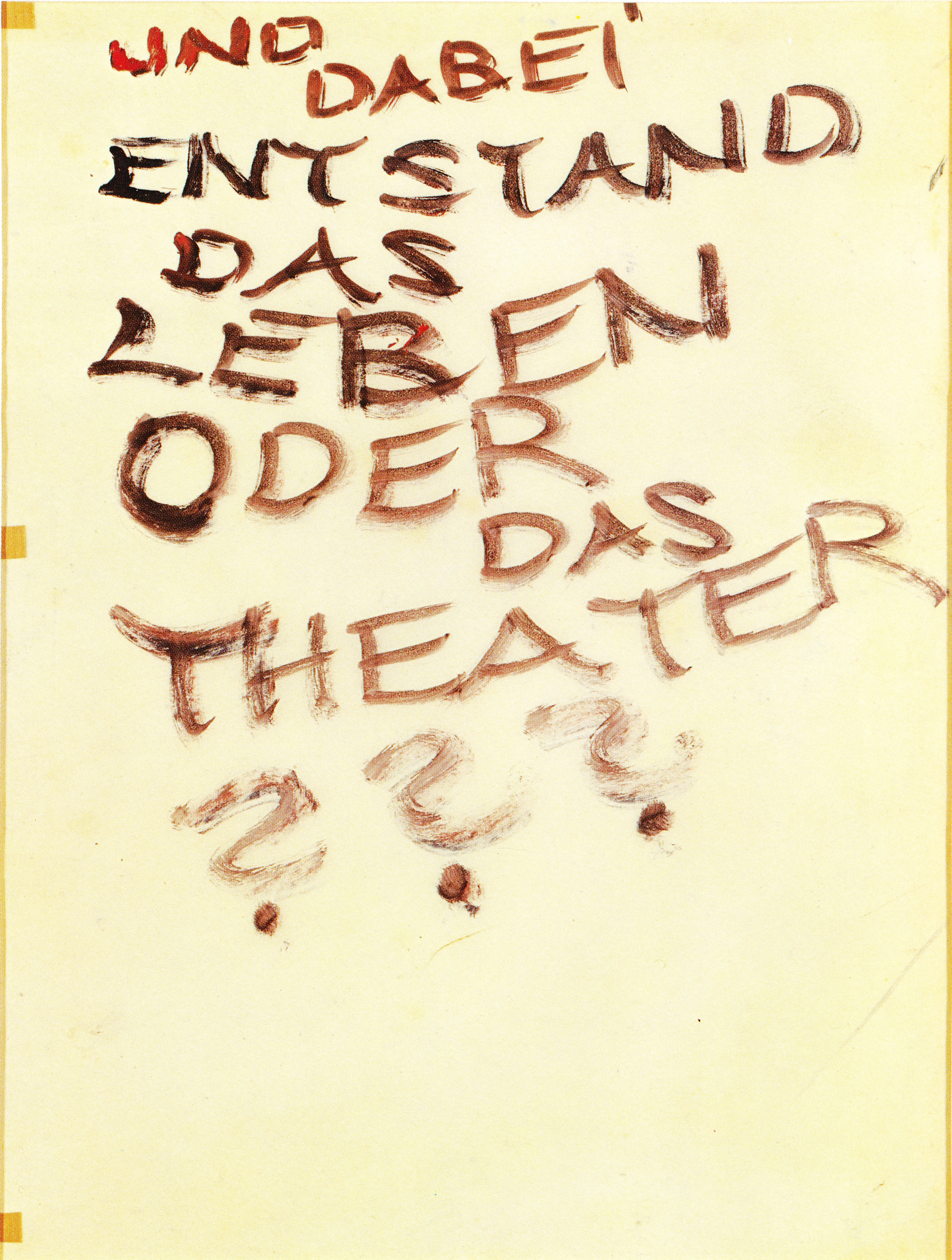
Transparent overlay

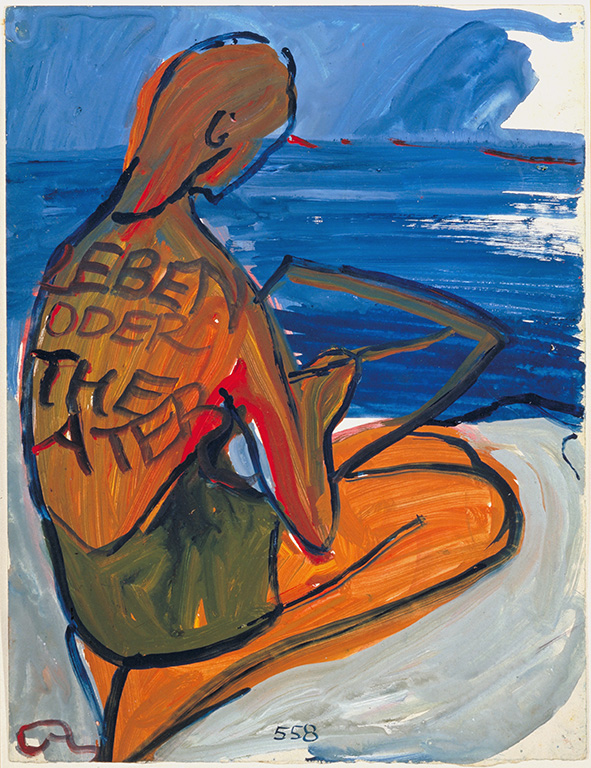
Gouache

The "signature image" (cf. Michael Steinberg 2005, p. 1) of Life? or Theater? occurs as the final image of the concluding Epilogue section. Steinberg is reminded of Franz Kafka's short story In the Penal Colony, in which sentence of execution is inscribed on the victim's back, and describes the image as combining the innocence of the mermaid of Copenhagen with violent narrative.

Because of the nature of the work, it requires three images adequately to convey it. The image on the left is of the last page (verso) of four pages of densely packed text, carried on both sides, that conclude the epilogue. The center image is the final example of the transparent overlays that occur throughout the work, while the rightmost image is the gouache most closely associated with the work, depicting Charlotte Salomon kneeling before the sea with brush and paper in her hand and the words Life or Theater inscribed on her back.

The concluding words of the epilogue, quoting ideas of Alfred Wolfsohn, are as follows:

...und sie sah – mit wachgeträumten Augen all die Schönheit um sich her – sah das Meer spürte die Sonne und wusste: sie musste für eine Zeit von der menschlichen Oberfläche verschwinden und dafür alle Opfer bringen – um sich aus der Tiefe ihre Welt neu zu schaffen
Und dabei entstand
das Leben oder das Theater???

... And with dream awakened eyes she saw all the beauty around her, saw the sea, felt the sun, and knew she had to vanish for a while from the human surface and make every sacrifice in order to create her world anew out of the depths.
And from that came
Life or Theater???

== Singespiel ==
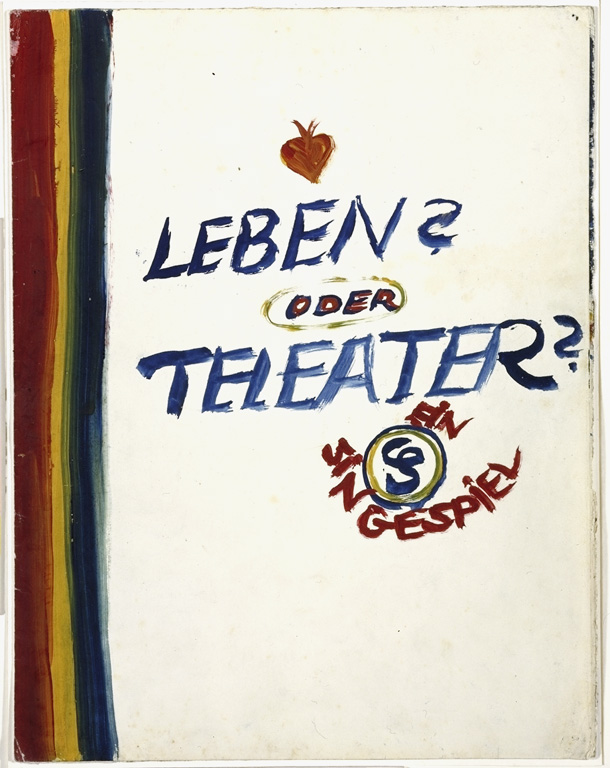
Title page of Leben? oder Theater?: Ein Singespiel

Salomon entitled her work, Leben? oder Theater?: Ein Singespiel. Singspiel is a German music form resembling "operetta" in some respects, although actors' parts are often spoken over, rather than sung with the music. The form is influenced by the English ballad opera and the French opéra-comique. Music provides the backdrop for the play-form which is most often comical in nature, tragedy being a less-frequent motif. Romantic interest nearly always plays a prominent part. Singspiel was considered less elevated than opera proper, often being written in the vernacular. While celebrated composers such as Mozart and Schubert are known to have worked in the form, Singspiel often introduced folksongs, marches and narrative songs into its repertoire. By the early twentieth century, at the time of Salomon's appropriation of the form into her work, the Singspiel had ceased to be a contemporary form (although Ralph Benatzky's popular 1930 work Im weißen Rößl is a singspiel and Kurt Weill introduced the term 'songspiel' to describe some of his collaborations with Berthold Brecht). Note that Salomon's spelling, "Singespiel", adds an "e", but whether this was intentional or not is unclear.

Thus, Life? or Theater? is not only a series of paintings. It includes a script in the form of words that are either themselves in the form of paintings, written into the paintings, or presented as overlays to the images. It also has a "soundtrack" – music chosen by Salomon that reinforces her stories. These range from Nazi marching songs to Schubert lieder and extracts from the music of Mozart and Mahler. The work is operatic in scale, highly modern in execution, unique in its form, and has an enduring power.

== Gallery of works ==
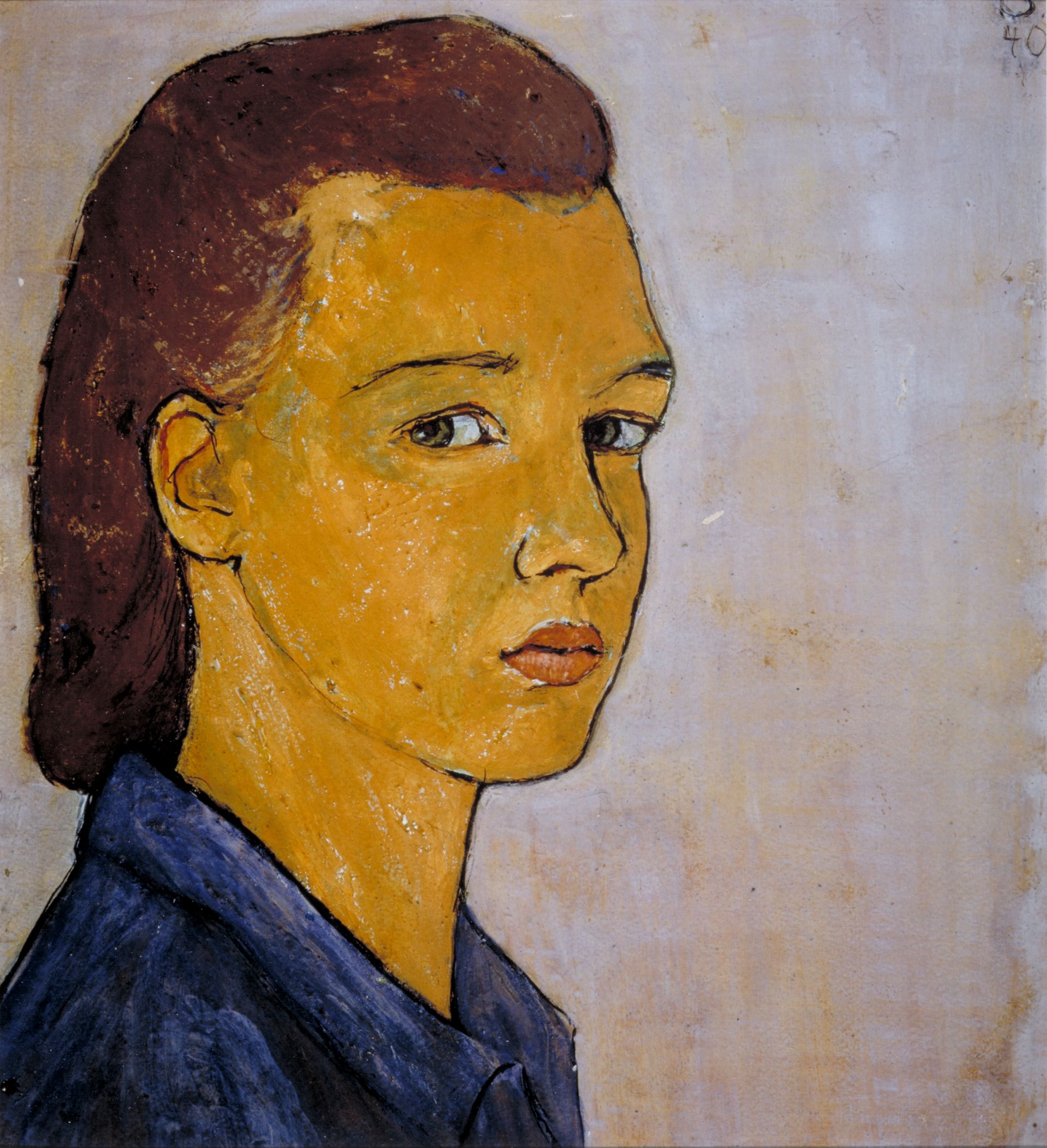
Charlotte Salomon, Self-portrait, 1940; gouache-paint on cardboard

== Reputation ==
=== In exhibitions and art history ===
The paintings that make up Life? or Theater? were first exhibited in the 1960s. The first book of reproductions was published in 1963 and drew comparisons with the story of Anne Frank. Marc Chagall was shown the paintings and was impressed. In 1971, the collection was placed in the care of the Joods Historisch Museum, Amsterdam. In 1981, the Museum presented 250 scenes in narrative sequence, and critics began to comment on the work. An exhibition at the London Royal Academy in 1998 was an unexpected sensation, helped by the publication of a complete catalogue. (Note: Griselda Pollock (2005 p. 34 n. 1) however criticised the 1981 catalogue as presenting a too specific framing of the work. The choice of cover art, the self-portrait uncharacteristic of her work in general with its transparent quotation of Vincent van Gogh's self portraiture and the single intimate cover title "Charlotte", establishes too early an unquestioned framing of the work as autobiographical and dramaturgy, and genders Salomon.) The work is still relatively little known, in part because Salomon's work does not appear on the international art market, as the whole archive belongs to the protective Charlotte Salomon Foundation based at the Joods Historisch Museum. The art historian Griselda Pollock dedicated to Charlotte Salomon a chapter in her Virtual Feminist Museum, analysing her work in terms of contemporary art, Jewish history and cultural theory. In 2018 Griselda Pollock then published a major analysis of Life? or Theatre? titled 'Charlotte Salomon and the Theatre of Memory' (Yale University Press, ISBN 978-0300100723) challenging the autobiographical interpretations with an examination of the philosophical question the artist posed to herself through reviewing the history of the lives, deaths and life choices of women in her family and one World War I survivor. It offers close visual examination of eight works and also examines critically the evidence around sexual abuse and the 'confession' first made public in the second film by Frans Weisz about Charlotte Salomon titled Life or Theater (2011)

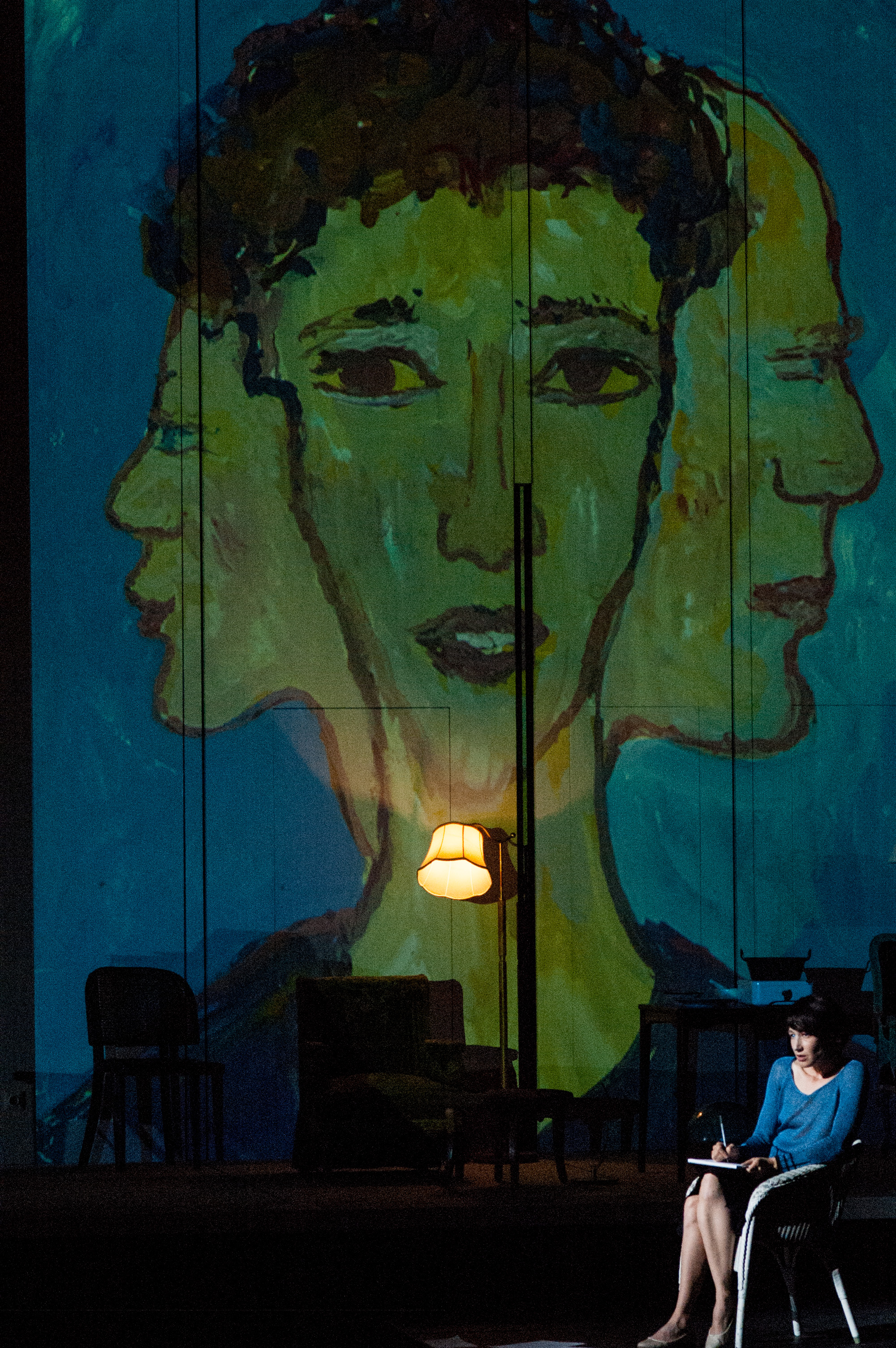
Charlotte Salomon, world premiere at the Salzburg Festival 2014

=== In the performing arts ===
There have been several other exhibitions of parts of Life? or Theater?, and a number of films and plays made about Charlotte Salomon's life, notably Company of Angels (2002) by the UK theatre company Horse and Bamboo Theatre which toured the UK, Netherlands and U.S. and in 1981, Dutch director Frans Weisz released a feature film based on her life, entitled Charlotte, with the Austrian actress Birgit Doll playing the artist and Daberlohn played by Derek Jacobi. In 2011 he made a documentary revealing the contents of her last letter to Wolfsohn.

Saving Charlotte, a play by Judi Herman, was performed at the Bridewell Theatre in London in October/November 1998.

Lotte's Journey, a play by Candida Cave, was performed at New End Theatre, Hampstead, in October/November 2007.

In remembrance of the artist, French composer Marc-André Dalbavie dedicated an opera to her: Charlotte Salomon, commissioned by the Salzburg Festival. The libretto by Barbara Honigmann is based on the gouaches Leben? oder Theater? and integrates them into the performance in form of projections. The main role of Charlotte is performed by two artists, an actress and a singer. Most of the singing is done in French while the spoken parts are in German. The world premiere took place at Salzburg's Felsenreitschule on 28 July 2014 on a panorama stage of 30 meters, conducted by the composer and directed by Luc Bondy. The two Charlotte Salomon roles were spoken by German Johanna Wokalek and sung by French Marianne Crebassa. The opera and its production received rave reviews by public and press.

A novel, Charlotte, written by David Foenkinos, was published in 2014, which won the prestigious French literary prize Le prix Théophraste Renaudot, among other prizes.

In February 2015, the Musiktheater im Revier (MiR) in Gelsenkirchen presented a ballet-opera by Michelle DiBucci based on life and work of the artist. Its title was Charlotte Salomon: Der Tod und die Malerin ("Death and the Painter"); it was choreographed and directed by Bridget Breiner. Again the autobiographical work Life? or Theater? formed the basis for the dramatization. DiBucci was originally commissioned to compose an opera on the life and work of Salomon by director Marie Zimmermann for the 2010 Ruhrtriennale. The work was not completed due to the death of Zimmermann in 2007. Several years later, DiBucci was approached by choreographer Bridget Breiner and asked to adapt the work into a full-length ballet. Charlotte Salomon: Der Tod und die Malerin was the winner of a 2015 Der Faust, Germany's highest honor in theatre. Bridget Breiner received the award for Best Choreography.

In 2017, to coincide with the 100th anniversary of Charlotte Salomon's birth, Charlotte: A Tri-Coloured Play with Music (Composer: Aleš Brezina, Librettist: Alon Nashman, Director/Scenographer: Pamela Howard) was presented at the Luminato Festival in Toronto, and at the World Stage Design Festival in Taipei, Taiwan. This singspiel, which "gives Salomon a wonderfully authentic and persuasive voice onstage", has music by Czech composer Aleš Březina, a libretto by Canadian performer/writer Alon Nashman, and is directed and designed by UK-based Pamela Howard, author of What is Scenography?. Charlotte: A Tri-Coloured Play with Music was developed with the assistance of Canadian Stage Company, and the Isabel Bader Centre for the Performing Arts. The role of Charlotte was played by Canadian soprano Adanya Dunn. In 2019, the company performed the play in Israel, Ukraine, and the Czech Republic.

An animated movie called Charlotte, based on Salomon's life and paintings, was released in 2021. It was initially set to be directed by Bibo Bergeron with a 10 million euro budget, but Bergeron left the film in October 2019. Eric Warin, co-director of Ballerina, and Tahir Rana, director of Welcome to the Wayne, co-directed the film, which features the voice acting of Keira Knightley as Salomon in the English version, and Marion Cotillard in the French version. The film had its world premiere at the 2021 Toronto International Film Festival on 13 September 2021.

In 2022 a documentary entitled Charlotte Salomon, Life and the Maiden (Charlotte Salomon, la jeune fille et la vie) honored her life and work.

== Commemoration ==
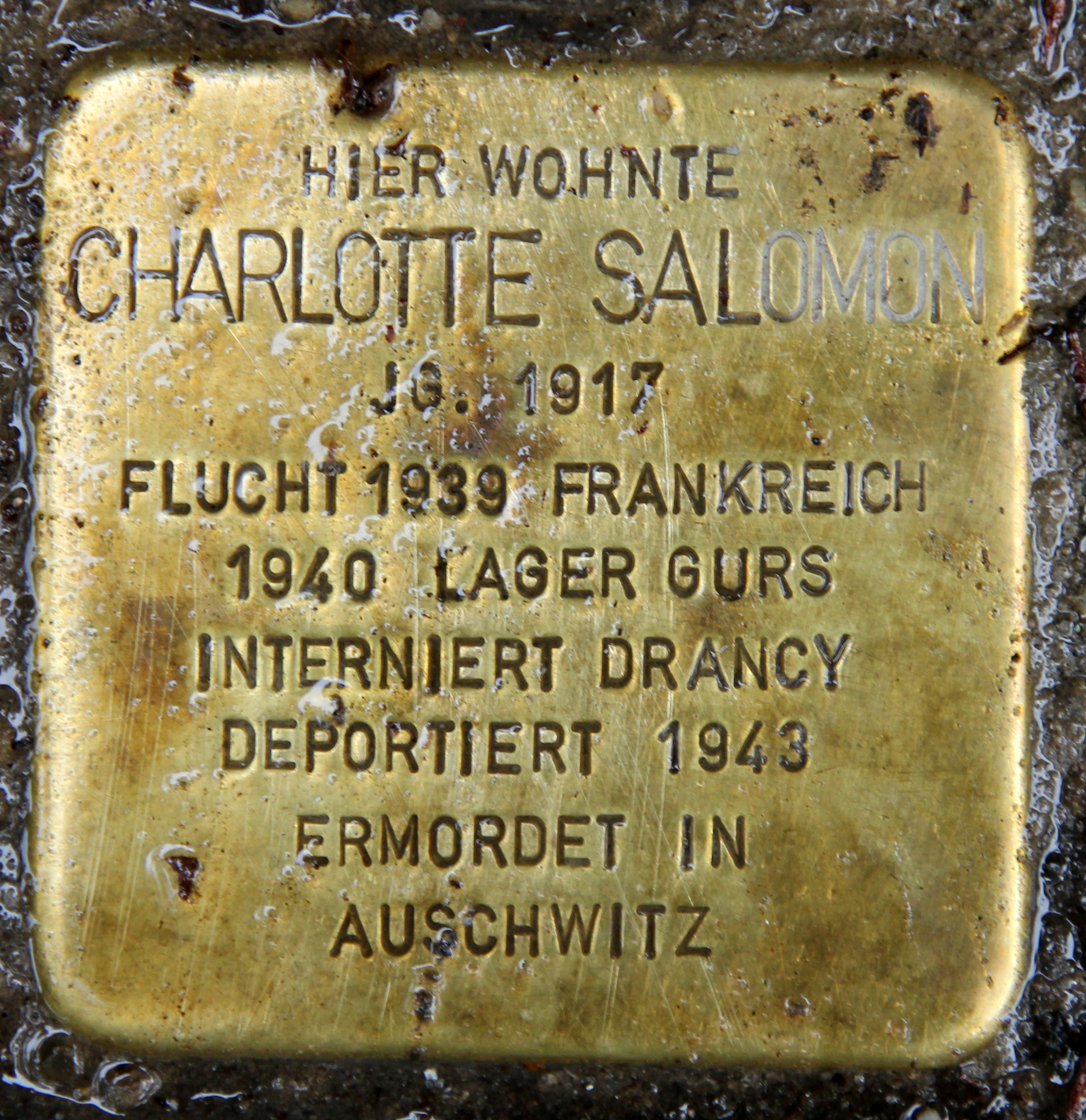
Stolperstein in Berlin

Since 1992 a primary school in Berlin bears the name of the artist, in 2006 a street in Berlin-Rummelsburg was named after her. On 21 April 2012 a Stolperstein in front of her former residential house in Berlin-Charlottenburg, Wielandstraße 15, was dedicated to Charlotte Salomon. In addition a Memorial Plaque on the facade of the building commemorates the artist.

== Sources ==
- Charlotte Salomon: Life or Theater. The Viking Press, New York, 1981. ISBN 0-670-21283-0.
- Mary Lowenthal Felstiner, To Paint Her Life. Harper Collins, 1994. ISBN 0-06-017105-7.
- Michael P. Steinberg (Editor), Monica Bohm-Duchen (Editor), Reading Charlotte Salomon, Cornell University Press, 2005. ISBN 0-8014-3971-X
- Ernst van Alphen, "Charlotte Salomon: Autobiography as a Resistance to History" in: Inside the Visible, edited by C. de Zegher, MIT Press, 1996.
- Griselda Pollock, "Theater of Memory: Trauma and Cure in Charlotte Salomon's Modernist Fairytale" in Steinberg and Bohm-Duchen (2005) ibid.
- Griselda Pollock, "Jewish space/Women's Time" in: Encounters in the Virtual Feminist Museum: Time, Space and the Archive. Routledge, 2007. ISBN 978-0-415-41374-9.
- Griselda Pollock, Life-Mapping in (ed.) Griselda Pollock, Conceptual Odysseys: Passages to Cultural Analysis, I.B. Tauris & Co Ltd, London, 2007, ISBN 978-1-84511-522-7 (pp. 63–88)
- Griselda Pollock, Charlotte Salomon and the Theatre of Memory. Yale University Press, 2018. ISBN 978-0300100723.
- Darcy C. Buerkle, Nothing Happened: Charlotte Salomon and an Archive of Suicide. University of Michigan Press, 2013.
- An eight minute film created by Studio Louter, using Salomon's original gouaches, for the Jewish Historical Museum. https://jwa.org/encyclopedia/article/salomon-charlotte
- (ed.) Judith C. E. Belinfante et al, Charlotte Salomon: Life? or Theatre?. Royal Academy of Arts, London, 1998, ISBN 0-900946-66-0 (pp. 15–25)
