= Michelle DiBucci =

American composer

Michelle DiBucci is an American composer born in 1961 who writes scores for opera, theater, dance, film, and TV. She has composed several of the scores featured in Wendigo, Carrier, Gêmeas and Creepshow. She is primarily a theater composer, with more than 30 credits.

== Awards ==
Her soundtrack for Wendigo won the WNYC New Sounds Listeners Poll: Best New Soundtracks.

Her ballet, Charlotte Salomon: Der Tod und die Malerin (Charlotte Salomon: Death and the Painter), was premiered at Musiktheater im Revier in Gelsenkirchen, Germany, in 2015 under the direction and choreography of Bridget Breiner. The work was awarded the 2015 Der Faust, Germany's highest prize for theater and dance, winning in the category of Best Choreography for Breiner.

DiBucci's music-theater work, Basetrack Live, had its New York premiere at Brooklyn Academy of Music (BAM), Next Wave Festival, in 2014 and was deemed part of the "Best Theater of 2014" list by Charles Isherwood of The New York Times.

Her music has been performed at Komische Oper Berlin, Stockholm Concert Hall, Alice Tully Hall, the BAM Harvey Theater, and at Zankel Hall in New York City.

== Education ==
DiBucci received her B.M. in Music Composition from Carnegie Mellon University and her M.M. in Music Composition from the Juilliard School in New York City. She has been on the faculty at the Juilliard School since 1992, teaching in both the music and drama divisions.

== Works ==
=== Concert ===
- Homage (commissioned by A Secreteria Municipal de Cultura)
- Powerhouse (commissioned by the Kronos Quartet)
- Helikopter (commissioned by Beyond The Machine, Juilliard)
- Prelude on Playthings of the Wind (commissioned by the Manhattan Wind Quintet)
- The Well
- The Garden of Earthly Delights; mezzo soprano, baritone, mixed ensemble
- Voice and/or Volumes Verbing the Unmind
- A Song; mezzo soprano, oboe, piano
- Three Piece Suit(e); clarinet, marimba, and cello. (commissioned by The American Thermoplastic Society)
- Dies Irae
- Seizure in Transit
- Carol of a Bird
- Fourth Dimension; trumpet, alto saxophone, trombone, vibraphone

=== Opera ===
- Charlotte Salomon: Der Tod under die Malerin (Death and the Painter), a ballet with singers based on Leben? Oder Theater? by Charlotte Salomon. Commissioned by Musiktheater im Revier, Gelsenkirchen, Germany. Choreography by Bridget Breiner. Premiered on February 14, 2015.
- Grail: Portrait of Faust as a Young Man
- The Garden Angel

=== Theater ===
- Basetrack Live, New York premiere: November 11, 2014, Next Wave Festival, Brooklyn Academy of Music.
- Versions (commissioned by Beyond The Machine)
- Basetrack (commissioned by Beyond The Machine)
- Biederman's Match, based on Max Frisch's Biedermann und die Brandstifter adapted by Beau Willimon with lyrics by Portia Kamons. Premiered on 11 February 2011 at the artist residency program, Launch Pad, at University of California, Santa Barbara, Risa Brainin, director.
- Fausto (commissioned by Pontificia Universidad Católica del Perú)
- O Principe de Copacabana
- Philoctetes (commissioned by Ensayo Theatre Co)
- Ventriloquist (commissioned by The Dry Opera Company and SESC)
- Nowhere Man
- Le Chien Andaluz (commissioned by The Dry Opera Company and FESC)
- Chief Butterknife
- The Oresteia (commissioned by The New World School for the Arts) Jorge Guerra, director
- Fanfare (commissioned by The Lincoln Center Institute)
- David's Scenario (commissioned by The Pittsburgh New Music Ensemble)
- Routine
- Fables Here and Then (commissioned by The Park Players and The Ensayo Theatre Co.)

=== Dance ===
- Charlotte Salomon: Der Tod und die Malerin (Charlotte Salomon: Death and the Painter)
- On the Nature of Things, commissioned by Pilobolus Dance Theater, New York, at The Joyce Theater on 15 July 2014.
- Don Juan Regresa de la Guerra
- Don Juan (commissioned by The Dry Opera Company, and Tuca)

=== Film and television ===
- Cancer (film), 2015
- Forgiveness, 2011
- Circus (TV series), 2010
- Carrier, 2007
- Wendigo (film), 2002
- Disney's 100 Years of Magic, 2001
- Gêmeas (Twins), 1999
- A Journey Within A Journey, 1996
- Creepshow, 1983
