= Charlotte Salomon: Der Tod und die Malerin =

Ballet by Bridget Breiner and Michelle DiBucci

Charlotte Salomon: Der Tod und die Malerin (Death and the Painter) is a ballet with singers in two acts by choreographer Bridget Breiner and composer, Michelle DiBucci. Set in 1940s France, the work concerns the creation of Leben? Oder Theater? (Life? Or Theater?) by the artist Charlotte Salomon (1917–1943) in 1941–1942 and her subsequent life and death in 1943 at the Drancy internment camp during The Holocaust in France.

== Composition ==
DiBucci originally conceived the work as an opera with a libretto by Marie and Klaus Pohl. They were commissioned by Marie Zimmermann to develop the work for the 2010 Ruhrtriennale. When Zimmermann died in 2007, the project was put on hold. DiBucci was next invited by choreographer Bridget Breiner to adapt the work for her ballet company, Ballet im Revier.

== Performance history ==
The world premiere was on 14 February 2015 at Musiktheater im Revier, Gelsenkirchen, Germany with Michael Schulz as intendant. The work was then remounted at Musiktheater im Revier in their 2015/2016 season. It was conducted both times by Finnish conductor and music director Valtteri Rauhalammi, leading the Neue Philharmonie Westfalen.

== Critical reception ==
Charlotte Salomon: Der Tod und die Malerin opened to positive reviews from the German press. Dorion Weickmann from Süddeutsche Zeitung praised the work by writing, "Can this subject matter be melded into a ballet soirée? Can dance meet the demands of that fragment of history? Gelsenkirchen's ballet director Bridget Breiner, together with the composer Michelle DiBucci, answered this question with a resounding, triumphant, yes!"

Bernd Aulich wrote for the Recklinghäuser Zeitung, "At Musiktheater im Revier, the spellbinding work of the New York composer, Michelle DiBucci, and the Gelsenkirchen Ballet Director, Bridget Breiner, in a celebrated premiere. Breiner and the large cast of highly motivated dancers, singers and musicians created a complex evening of exceptional intensity."

Marieluise Jeitschko commented in Theater Pur, "Michelle DiBucci composed a gripping score for Breiner's ballet, with a brilliant stage set by Juergen Kirner. The Neue Philharmonie Wesphalia performed passionately under Valtteri Rauhalammi. The Ballet im Revier keeps raising its profile. All involved gained the respect of, and were celebrated by the audience attending the premiere."

== Awards ==
Charlotte Salomon: Der Tod und die Malerin was nominated for two Faust Awards: Bridget Breiner for choreography (won), Kusha Alexi for lead dancer.

== Roles ==
The ballet is for 13 dancers, 6 singers and a chamber orchestra of 17 players.

Roles, premiere casts
Role	Premiere cast, 14 February 2015	2015/16 season cast
Charlotte	Kusha Alexi	Bridget Breiner
Death	Jonathan Ollivier	Jiří Jelínek
Paulinka	Ayako Kikuchi	Junior Demitre
Daberlohn	Junior Demitre	Ayako Kikuchi
Ensemble	Francesca Berruto, Nora Brown, Rita Duclos, Sara Zinna, Fabio Boccalatte, Ordep R. Chacon, Velentin Juteau, Hugo Mercier, Josè Urrutia	Francesca Berruto, Rita Duclos, Tessa Vanheusden, Sara Zinna, Carlos Contreras, Valentin Juteau, Louiz Rodrigues, Ledian Soto, José Urrutia
1933 Solo	Valentin Juteau	Valentin Juteau
Kristallnacht Solo	Francesca Berruto	Francesca Berruto
Pfefferbäume Pas de Deux	Nora Brown, Josè Urrutia	Sara Zinna, Josè Urrutia
Grossmutter Solo	Rita Duclos	Rita Duclos
Grossvater Solo	Hugo Mercier	Carlos Contreras
Mezzo-soprano	Anke Sieloff	Anke Sieloff
Countertenor	Thomas Diestler	Thomas Diestler
Tenor	Lars-Oliver Rühl	Lars-Oliver Rühl
Baritone 1	Michael Dahmen	Michael Dahmen
Baritone 2	Piotr Prochera	Piotr Prochera
Bass	Joachim G. Maass	Joachim G. Maass
