= Sarah Marshall =

Sarah Marshall may refer to:

- Sarah Marshall (British actress) (1933–2014), British stage, TV and film actress
- Sarah Marshall (American stage actress) (born 1955)
- Sarah Marshall (French model) (born 1981), French model and actress
- Sarah Marshall (writer), American journalist, writer, and podcast host

== See also ==
- Forgetting Sarah Marshall, a 2008 film
