= Wendigo (film) =

2001 American psychological horror film

- Theatrical release poster
- Directed by: Larry Fessenden
- Written by: Larry Fessenden
- Produced by: Jeffrey Levy-Hinte
- Starring: Patricia Clarkson; Jake Weber; Erik Per Sullivan
- Cinematography: Terry Stacey
- Edited by: Larry Fessenden
- Music by: Michelle DiBucci
- Production companies: Antidote Films; Glass Eye Pix
- Distributed by: Magnolia Pictures
- Release dates: January 23, 2001 (Slamdance Festival); December 17, 2002 (United States)
- Running time: 91 minutes
- Country: United States
- Language: English

Wendigo is a 2001 American psychological horror film written and directed Larry Fessenden and starring Patricia Clarkson, Jake Weber, and Erik Per Sullivan. The film centers around a photographer and his family who, during a wintery weekend in upstate New York, experience the presence of a dark force in a cabin while being stalked by a local hunter after they accidentally hit a deer on the road. Meanwhile, George's son, Miles, starts having vivid hallucinations of the legendary Wendigo, who he believes to be responsible for the dark forces.

The film was produced by Antidote Films and Glass Eye Pix, and was distributed by Magnolia Pictures. It received mixed reviews by critics.

== Plot ==
George is a highly strung professional photographer who is starting to unravel under the stress of his work at a Manhattan advertising agency. Needing some time away from the city, his wife Kim, and their 10-year-old son Miles head to upstate New York to take in the winter sights, though the drive up is hardly relaxing for any of them.

George accidentally hits and severely injures a deer that runs onto the icy road. When George stops to inspect the wounded animal, he is confronted by an angry local named Otis. Otis flies into a rage, telling George that he and his fellow hunters had been tracking the deer for some time. An argument breaks out, leaving George deeply shaken. When George and Kim arrive at their cabin, they discover that a dark and intimidating presence seems to have taken it over.

The next day, they stop at a store in a town, where a Native American shopkeeper tells Miles about the legend of the Wendigo, a deformed beast from Native American folklore who changes from a human to a hideous beast after engaging in cannibalism. The shopkeeper also tells him that the Wendigo has supernatural powers and the ability to change its appearance at will. The shopkeeper gifts Miles a small figurine of a Wendigo. Miles soon believes the Wendigo has something to do with the dark forces at work in the woods near the cabin.

Later that day, while sledding together, George suddenly falls to the ground, leaving Miles alone and lost in the woods. Frightened, Miles approaches his dad, is chased by the Wendigo, and passes out. He is awakened later by a frightened Kim, who went searching for the two after they failed to return.

Kim and Miles begin a trek deep into the forest until they end up at the house, where they find a bloody George crawling towards the car, claiming Otis shot him. Frantic, Kim and Miles put George in the car and drive to the nearest hospital. It is revealed that George and Miles were sledding near a shooting range and Otis shot George in the liver with a hunting rifle. George undergoes emergency surgery and Miles walks into the hospital, hallucinates that his father is being assaulted by the Wendigo, and faints. When Miles awakens, he learns that George has died.

Otis is confronted by the local sheriff, but he kills the sheriff and drives away into the night, being stalked by the Wendigo until he crashes into a tree and runs away into the forest, eventually ending up on a road where he is hit by the deputy sheriff's squad car. Otis is taken into the emergency room of the hospital, followed by the Native American shopkeeper while Miles watches, caressing the Wendigo figurine.

== Cast ==
- Patricia Clarkson as Kim
- Jake Weber as George
- Erik Per Sullivan as Miles
- John Speredakos as Otis
- Christopher Wynkoop as Sheriff Tom Hale
- Lloyd Oxendine as Elder
- Brian Delate as Everett
- Daniel Stewart Sherman as Billy
- Jennifer Wiltsie as Martha
- Maxx Stratton as Brandon
- Richard Stratton as Earl
- Dash Stratton as Little Otis
- James Godwin as Wendigo

== Production ==
Wendigo was shot on location in upstate New York on 16 mm film.

== Release ==
Wendigo premiered at the Slamdance Film Festival in Los Angeles on January 23, 2001. The film had a limited theatrical release screening at independent and arthouse theaters in various U.S. cities in 2002, opening in New York City on February 15, Chicago on February 22, Los Angeles on March 1, and Portland, Oregon on June 28.

=== Home media ===
The film was released on DVD by Artisan Entertainment on December 17, 2002. It was re-released by Cinema Club on June 16, 2003.

Scream Factory released the film on Blu-ray as part of a four-film set of films by director Larry Fessenden on October 20, 2015. Vinegar Syndrome released a 4K UHD Blu-ray edition of the film on October 28, 2025.

== Reception ==
On the review aggregator website Rotten Tomatoes, 60% of 50 critics' reviews are positive, with an average rating of 6.5/10. The website's consensus reads: "An artsy horror flick, Wendigo effectively creates an eerie atmosphere." Metacritic, which uses a weighted average, assigned the film a score of 63 out of 100, based on 19 critics, indicating "generally favorable" reviews.

Roger Ebert gave the film two and a half out of four stars, writing: "Wendigo is a good movie with an ending that doesn't work. While it was not working I felt a keen disappointment, because the rest of the movie works so well". Dave Kehr of The New York Times gave the film a positive review stating, "As in his previous films, Mr. Fessenden carefully blurs the line between psychology and the supernatural, suggesting that each is strongly implicated in the other. The rampaging Wendigo may be a manifestation of Miles's incipient Oedipal rage, but at the same time it is a force embedded in nature and history. Such abstract notions may put off fans of the genre in its most elemental, slice-and-dice form. But for those in search of something different, Wendigo is a genuinely bone-chilling tale". Felix Vasquez, Jr. from Cinema Crazed.com gave the film a positive review, praising the film's ending and suspense. AllMovie called the film "effectively creepy" and "surprisingly unsettling", "despite its inherent cheesiness". Ed Gonzalez of Slant Magazine praised Fessenden's screenplay and the film's atmosphere, awarding it three out of four stars.

Scott Foundas of Variety suggested that "[the film], which should rivet audiences attracted to the more philosophical elements of The Blair Witch Project and The Sixth Sense could build strong word-of-mouth if not misrepresented as a conventional monster movie". Roger Ebert also compared it to The Blair Witch Project in his review.
