= Albert Salomon (surgeon) =

German surgeon

- Born: 1883; Germany
- Died: 1976; Amsterdam, Netherlands
- Occupation: Surgeon
- Known for: Early research in mammography
- Children: Charlotte Salomon

Albert Salomon (1883–1976) was a Jewish-German surgeon at the Royal Surgical University Clinic in Berlin. He is best known for his study of early mastectomies that is considered the beginning of mammography. He was the father of the artist Charlotte Salomon.

== Breast pathology ==
In 1913, Salomon performed a study on 3,000 mastectomies. In the study, Salomon compared X-rays of the breasts to the actual removed tissue, observing specifically microcalcifications. By doing so, he was able to establish the difference as seen on an X-ray image between cancerous and non-cancerous tumors in the breast. Salomon's mammographs provided substantial information about the spread of tumors and their borders. In the midst of the study, Salomon also discovered that there are multiple types of breast cancer. Salomon was unable to use this technique in practice because he did not work with breast cancer patients, and although he published his findings in 1913, mammography did not become a common practice until years later.

== Later life ==
Salomon was dismissed from the University of Berlin in 1933 after Adolf Hitler came to power. He was later imprisoned in Sachsenhausen concentration camp. He was released in 1939 and left for the Netherlands. From there he was deported to the Westerbork transit camp in (Drente) Holland, from where he escaped in 1943 and went into hiding in the Netherlands until 1945. After World War II ended, he moved to Amsterdam, where he worked as a professor.
