= Jason Grote =

American writer (born 1971)

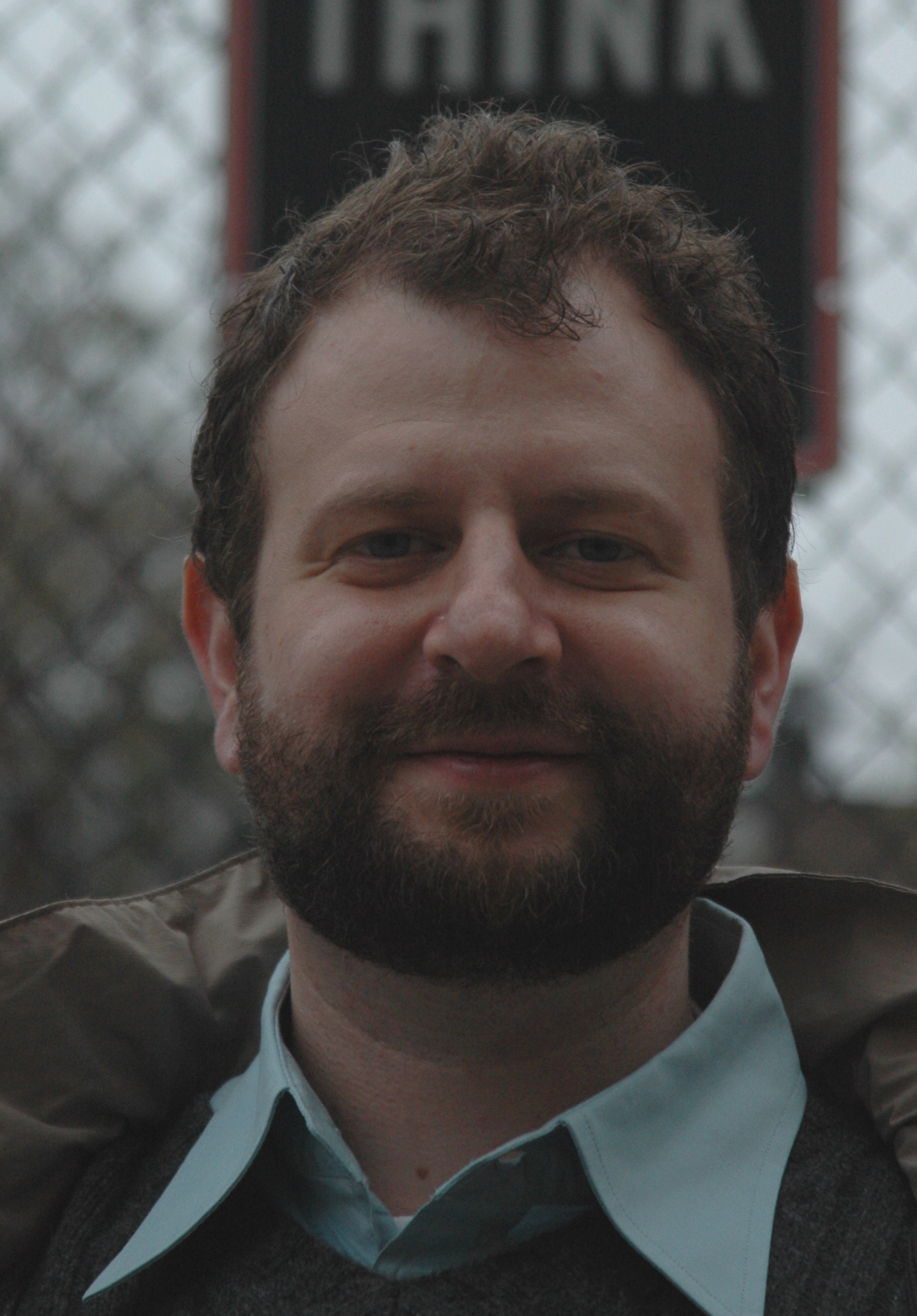
- Grote in 2005
- Education: New York University (MFA)
- Occupations: Playwright, screenwriter
- Spouse: Lorraine Martindale
- Writing career
- Genres: Surrealism, satire
- Notable work: 1001, Maria/Stuart, Civilization (all you can eat), "The Crash", Rogue, Knightfall

Jason Grote (born 1971) is an American playwright and screenwriter. He wrote a series of plays in the 2000s that were known for addressing contemporary themes in the context of classic literature with multilayered stories jumping back and forth between fantastic and realistic scenes. In the 2010s, Grote became a television writer with credits on Smash, Mad Men, Rogue and Knightfall, as well as the video game series BioShock.

== Early life and education ==
Grote was born in Lakewood Township, New Jersey and raised in a working-class family. He studied theater at Montclair State University, where he took a playwriting class, then moved to Williamsburg, Brooklyn, in 1997. After a few years of acting, writing and directing in New York—including having a play performed at the New York International Fringe Festival—Grote enrolled in the master of fine arts program at New York University, graduating in 2003.

== Playwriting career ==
Grote's early plays included The New Jersey Book of the Dead; Box Americana, a play about Walmart that includes a "chatty phantom named Sam, who happens to be the spirit of late capitalism"; and This Storm Is What We Call Progress, a Kabbalah-themed story that premiered at the Washington's Rorschach Theatre in 2008. During his playwriting career, Grote has had residencies with New Dramatists and at Yaddo. He received a commission from the theater collective Radiohole to write the text for their performance Tarzana.

=== 1001 ===
Grote's first major success was 1001, a play inspired by the One Thousand and One Nights. 1001 premiered at the Denver Center Theater in 2007 and later that year played at the Baruch Performing Arts Center in New York. The play jumps back and forth between the setting of the stories with the central character Scheherazade, who morphs into Dahna, a New York-based Palestinian grad student, while Scheherazade's violent husband Shahriyar morphs into Dahna's Jewish boyfriend, Alan. The layered plot includes stories within the story that involve Gustave Flaubert and Jorge Luis Borges.

According to The New York Times, the play was "often heavy-handed" but praised its "dynamic storytelling [for] spin[ning] us over the rough spots." The play won an Ovation Award from The Denver Post. Grote adapted 1001 into a musical, with music by Marisa Michelson, which debuted off-Broadway in 2018. The New York Times said the show was "at its best when it flat-out mocks American ignorance and the stubbornness of ethnic clichés" but critiqued Grote's book for getting "bogged down as it tries to layer a time-shifting plot". Tablet praised Grote's skill with dialogue but called the characters "frustratingly trope-laden."

=== Maria/Stuart ===
In 2008, Maria/Stuart premiered at Woolly Mammoth Theatre Company in Washington, D.C., with Sarah Marshall in a starring role. The play is a dramedy adapted from Friedrich Schiller's play Mary Stuart, drawn from the relationship of Elizabeth I and her cousin Mary, Queen of Scots. The play focuses on female rivalry in a contemporary U.S. suburban environment and includes supernatural elements. According to The Washington Post, This Storm Is What We Call Progress and Maria/Stuart established Grote's reputation for "scripts that explode the boundaries between the ordinary and the chimerical, the political and the aesthetic, the intimate and the dizzyingly cosmic."

=== Civilization (all you can eat) ===
From 2008 to 2011, Grote developed a surreal satire of contemporary life called Civilization (all you can eat), which features a plotline involving a pig named Big Hog plotting an escape from an abattoir layered into a story about a struggling waitress, her daughter who seeks financial success through online pornography. The play also addresses commercialism and interracial marriage. According to Grote, it "documents the very beginning of the romance with Obama, the backlash against Obama, and the dawn of social media." Civilization was mounted at Clubbed Thumb's Summerworks festival in 2011, then given a world premiere at Woolly Mammoth, with Sarah Marshall in the role of Big Hog, in 2012.

=== Habit ===
Toward the end of his time in New York, Grote wrote a devised theatre work called Children of Kings for David M. Levine's performance installation Habit, which premiered in 2012. For the play-within-a-play, a ranch house set was constructed inside a warehouse, with three actors performing Grote's 90-minute play on a loop. Audience members would enter and depart at any point during the performance and could only view the play through the windows and doors of the house. Grote described the script as "a parody of the realism that dominated American stages at the time." Habit was recognized with a special citation in the 2013 Obie Awards.

=== Basetrack Live ===
In 2014 Grote adapted an online citizen journalism project called One-Eight Basetrack with Seth Bockley and Anne Hamburger for En Garde Arts. The multimedia theatrical piece, called Basetrack Live, is drawn entirely from text about the impact of war on veterans and their families. It premiered at the Brooklyn Academy of Music Next Wave Festival and was a New York Times critics' pick, with Charles Isherwood saying, "this production brings the gritty, brutal truths alive in ways that nothing I've read or seen has succeeded in doing."

== Television career ==
In 2010, the post-financial crisis recession affecting live theater and a layoff from a teaching job at Rutgers University left Grote unemployed. He pivoted to television writing with work on Smash, a musical drama series that premiered in 2012. Grote relocated to Los Angeles, where he continued to work on television shows, including Hannibal, The Lizzie Borden Chronicles, Rogue (for which he was also story editor) and Knightfall (which he also co-produced).

For his work on the Mad Men episode "The Crash", International Business Times said that Grote and Matthew Weiner "got one of the very best performances we've seen from Jon Hamm in an episode that delivers scenes almost too funny to be believed alongside genuine, nail-biting terror." That episode was named the 9th best episode of the show by Entertainment Weekly. In 2012, he was one of the Mad Men writers nominated for the Writers Guild of America Awards for television drama.

Grote also co-wrote Poppy, a TV comedy pilot about the young George H. W. Bush with Will Menaker and Matt Christman of the Chapo Trap House podcast.

== Other activities and personal life ==
Grote has written for the BioShock video game franchise and was a contributor to The Brooklyn Rail. In addition to his writing, Grote has taught writing at Rutgers University, the University of California, San Diego, the Eugene O'Neill Theater Center, Queens College (CUNY), the University of Rochester, Hollins University, Point Park University and Whitman College. He was also a DJ on the New Jersey free-form radio station WFMU.

Grote has been involved in political activism. He was arrested inside the Times Square Disney Store along with Reverend Billy and others in 1999 while protesting the company's usage of sweatshop labor. Of that event he said "We can't hope to overwhelm this level of late-capitalist spectacle, but we can grab it, transform it and reverse its purpose: we can use it to reveal." During the 2004 Republican National Convention in New York, he dressed with clown makeup in an Air National Guard uniform emblazoned with the words "Mission Complicated" in mockery of George W. Bush. At one time, he was "arrested in a demonstration that involved releasing 10,000 crickets in downtown New York to protest the city's sale of community gardens," according to The Washington Post. As a Writers Guild of America member, he has advocated for contracts that enable writers to maintain middle-class lifestyles.

Grote is married to novelist Lorraine Martindale. They have two children.

== Works ==
=== Stage ===
Year	Title	Notes
2004	The New Jersey Book of the Dead	Premiered at Bloomington Playwrights Project, Bloomington, Indiana
2006	Box Americana	Premiered at the Working Theater, New York City
2007	1001	Premiered at Denver Center Theater
2008	Hamilton Township	Premiered at Salvage Vanguard Theatre, Austin, Texas
2008	This Storm Is What We Call Progress	Premiered at Rorschach Theatre, Washington, D.C.
2008	Maria/Stuart	Premiered at Woolly Mammoth Theatre Company, Washington, D.C.
2008	Darwin's Challenge	First reading at Ensemble Studio Theatre, New York City
2009	Three Classics	Collection of three one-act plays: (Anti)gone, In His Bold Gaze, My Ruin is Writ Large and Prometheus Rendered
2011	Civilization (all you can eat)	Premiered at Woolly Mammoth Theatre Company, Washington, D.C., 2012
2012	Children of Kings	Premiered as a play within a play during David M. Levine's performance installation Habit
2014	Basetrack Live	Premiered at the Brooklyn Academy of Music Next Wave Festival
2015-6	Tarzana	A collaboration with Radiohole at Mass Live Arts and The Performing Garage
2017	Shostakovich, or Silence	
2018	One Thousand Nights and One Day	Musical adaptation of 1001 with music by Marisa Michelson

=== Television ===
Year	Title	Writer (individual episodes)	Story editor	Producer
2012	Smash	Yes	No	No
2013	Mad Men	Yes	No	No
2014	Hannibal	Yes	No	No
2015	The Lizzie Borden Chronicles	Yes	No	No
2015–16	Rogue	Yes	Yes	No
2017–18	Knightfall	Yes	No	Yes
