= Maria/Stuart =

Maria/Stuart is a play by Jason Grote (1001, This Storm is What We Call Progress), which premiered in 2008 at Woolly Mammoth Theatre Company in Washington, DC. The play, inspired by Friedrich Schiller's tale of warring queens presents a comically dark escapade into the secrets of suburban America.

== Plot summary ==
Maria/Stuart focuses on an unhappy family as they struggle with their collective past. Ruthie, the matriarchal grandmother of the family, has a day pass from the nursing home to join the family in a celebration of her birthday. Along with Ruthie, the family includes the rival sisters, Marnie and Lizzie, nutty Aunt Sylvia and cousins Hannah and Stuart. Just as Stuart approaches his big break as a comic book artist, a German-babbling, soda-guzzling shapeshifter appears to unlock his family's skeletons. Three generations of fierce women surround Stuart and attempt to drive back the past, but these sisters and cousins seem destined to destroy each other. Eccentrically comic and eerily haunting, this Friedrich Schiller-inspired tale with a supernatural twist shows just how far a family will go to keep the past dead and buried.

== Inspiration ==
In 1800, Friedrich Schiller wrote Maria Stuart, a play about the 16th century Queen of Scotland Mary Stuart. Schiller's Romantic dramatization explores the rivalry between Mary and her cousin, England's Queen Elizabeth I – both of whom laid claim to the English throne following the death of Henry VIII. In Maria/Stuart, Grote explores the theme of female rivalry and depicts occasional departures from realism. Jason Grote began Maria/Stuart by outlining the structure of Schiller's play and drawing parallels in his own. Ultimately, actual text from Schiller's play emerges to reveal an unexpected dimension of Grote's.

== Overview ==
DC Theatre Scene said of the world premiere of Maria/Stuart: "absolutely astonishing. Tremendous writing, incredible acting. And laughs. Big laughs".

Of the playwright, The Washington Post wrote “Grote has made a name for himself in recent years with scripts that explode the boundaries between the ordinary and the chimerical, the political and the aesthetic, the intimate and the dizzyingly cosmic.”
