= David M. Levine =

Theater professor and visual artist

- Born: 1970 (age 55–56); New York City
- Education: Cornell University, Harvard University
- Known for: performance art, video art, conceptual art, experimental theater
- Awards: Guggenheim; 2018
- Website: davidlevine.art

David Marcel Levine (born 1970) is a theater professor and visual artist, currently a Professor of the Practice of Performance, Theater, and Media at Harvard University.

== Early life and education ==
Levine was born in 1970 in New York City to Morton and Anne Marie Levine. He holds a B.A. from Cornell University (1992) and an M.A. in English Literature from Harvard University (1996).

== Selected works ==
Levine's work encompasses performance, installation, and video. Performance installations include Bauerntheater (English: Farmers’ Theater) in 2007, a project in Joachimsthal, Germany, sponsored by the German Federal Cultural Foundation, in which he hired an American actor to learn German farming and then "farm" on a publicly accessible field for 10 hours a day, six days a week, for six weeks. This was an early example of his later themes of "acting as a technique for absolutely turning into someone else."

In 2012 he created the performance installation Habit, in which the audience is mobile, viewing the performance through the windows of a house, moving from vantage point to vantage point as the action moves. The actors in Habit worked for eight-hour days, performing the same 90 minutes worth of dialogue by playwright Jason Grote, but improvising the staging from moment-to-moment. In the summer of 2015, as a commission from the public art organization Creative Time, he restaged iconic scenes from movies set in New York's Central Park. Actors performed the scenes in their original location, on a perpetual loop, for six hours a day. in what The New Yorker called "A Real-Life GIF in Central Park".

Levine's solo exhibition Some of the People, All of The Time featured 8 actors performing a monologue from the point of view of a movie crowd extra turned paid protester. The New York Times called it some of the best art of 2018.

Levine worked as a theater director in New York and Berlin before branching out into conceptual art. For his first solo gallery show, he created an installation entitled Hopeful at the Feinkost gallery in Berlin, which consisted of thousands of actors' headshots collected from the trash cans of New York casting agencies, a meta-commentary on the headshot-as-object.

In 2022, Levine premiered the holographic-style three-dimensional video piece Dissolution, a 17-minute looped film about a dematerialized and confined consciousness. It was shown at the Jeu de Paume in 2022, and at the Museum of the Moving Image in 2023. The film, called "a piece influenced by Brechtian principles of estrangement and alienation," by The Paris Review was accompanied by a broadside publication, limited to 75 copies.

Levine was Professor of Art and Director of Studio and Performing Arts at Bard College Berlin from 2008-2014. He started at Harvard University's Theater, Dance & Media department, as Professor of the Practice in 2015, serving as Chair from 2024 to the end of 2025.

== Writing ==
Levine's essays on art, theater, and performance, have been published widely. He is the author, along with Alix Rule, of the 2012 essay International Art English, which describes and diagrams the language of contemporary art by analyzing artists’ statements, wall labels, criticism, and a corpus of more than fourteen thousand press releases sent by e-flux. The essay has been both anthologized and republished, and considered a key text (and term) in debates over the politics of art writing. He wrote and contributed images to A Discourse on Method, an artists' book he created with Shonni Enelow which came out in 2019.

Levine co-wrote, with Rose Lichter-Marck, the film PRƎPPY, a feature film about the Preppy Murder, which will begin shooting in September 2026 with Janicza Bravo directing. He has been a longtime contributor to BOMB Magazine.

Levine's father was one of the executors of the estate of Mark Rothko, a situation that turned into a protracted legal dispute, the Rothko Case. He wrote about the effect that had on his family and his career for Triple Canopy in Matter of Rothko.

== Awards and recognition ==
Levine was a 2013 Fellow in Visual Arts at the Radcliffe Institute for Advanced Study. He was the recipient of a 2018 Guggenheim Fellowship. His installation Habit received a 2013 Village Voice Obie award.

His work has been presented by MoMA, Mass MoCA, PS1, and the Museum of Fine Arts, Boston. He has received fellowships and grants from the New York Foundation for the Arts, the Watermill Center, and the Foundation for Contemporary Arts. He did two MacDowell residencies—one in 2014 and one in 2025.

He won a Spark Award from Harvard in 2026.
