= En Garde Arts =

American theatre company

En Garde Arts is a New York City-based theatre company with a focus on site-specific theatre. It was founded in 1985 by artistic director Anne Hamburger. Self-described as an artist-centric company, the company supports playwrights, directors, composers, and designers in creating new work from the ground up. En Garde's productions have earned six Obie Awards, two Drama Desk Awards, the Special Outer Critics Circle Award, and the Edwin Booth Award. From 1985 to 1999, the company staged pieces in architectural sites and neighborhoods such as Central Park and the Meatpacking District.

== En Garde Arts in the 1980s and 1990s ==
From 1985 to 1999, Hamburger commissioned playwrights, directors and composers to create theatrical pieces for architectural sites and neighborhoods. The roster of En Garde's alumni artists includes playwrights Charles L. Mee, Mac Wellman, María Irene Fornés; composers David Van Tieghem, Jonathan Larson; directors Michael Engler, Tina Landau, Anne Bogart, Reza Abdoh, Jim Simpson and Bill Rauch; and actors Carl Hancock Rux, Fiona Shaw, Fisher Stevens, Tyne Daly and Jefferson Mays. Audiences followed their work to a variety of locations, including Central Park, the Meatpacking District, Penn Yards, East River Park, Pier 25, the Chelsea Hotel, the Victory Theater (New Victory Theatre), and the intersection of Wall and Broad Streets in Lower Manhattan.

In 1989, En Garde produced a series of three plays at the Dairy, Belvedere Castle and Bow Bridge in Central Park. Obie Awards for Best New American Play and Best Director were given to Bad Penny playwright Mac Wellman and director Jim Simpson. The following year, Wellman's play Crowbar became the first legitimate theatrical production to be held in 42nd Street's Victory Theatre in 60 years. Crowbar was produced prior to 42nd Street's redevelopment, so a group of volunteers cleaned the interior to make way for Mac Wellman's new play. Directed by Richard Caliban with music by David Van Tieghem, Crowbar won Obie awards for En Garde Arts and actor Elżbieta Czyżewska, and was granted a special award by the Outer Critics Circle.

En Garde continued to produce work throughout the 1990s. Reza Abdoh and Mira-Lani Oglesby's work Father Was a Peculiar Man took place over nine distinct locations through the Meatpacking District. In an abandoned Victorian hospital on West 106th Street, Charles L. Mee's Another Person Is a Foreign Country confronted the social marginalization of unconventional people. Director Anne Bogart's cast included a blind choir with seeing-eye dogs, a group of emotionally disturbed rock musicians, and a man and woman, both 3’ tall, all staged against the Gothic, empty Towers Nursing Home (New York Cancer Hospital).

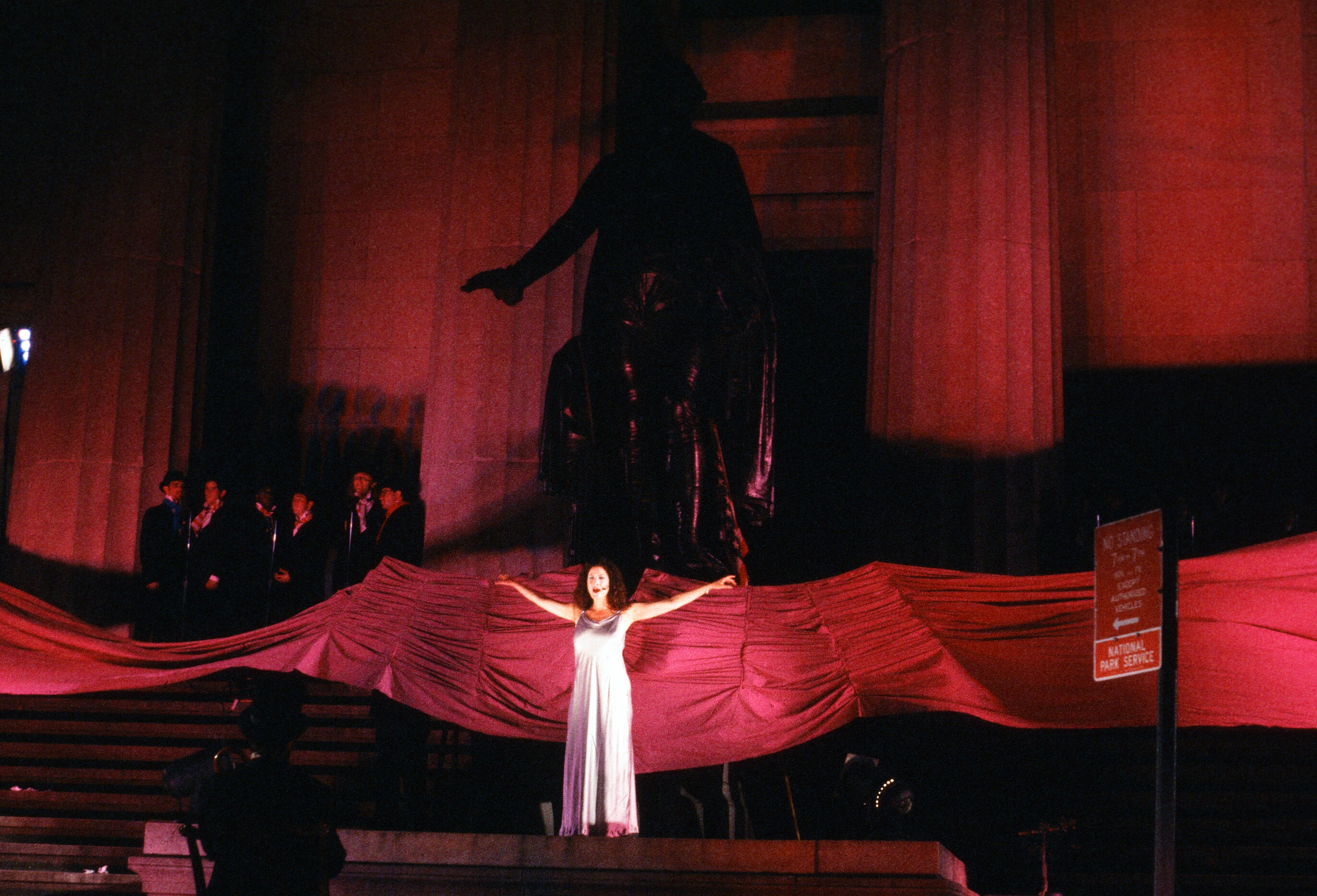
J.P. Morgan Saves the Nation 1995

In another piece, Hamburger used the New York Stock Exchange as a backdrop for JP Morgan Saves the Nation by composer Jonathan Larson.

== Production history ==
Year	Production	Credits
1985	The Ritual Project (Central Park)	Written by Nancy Beckett, composer Kim Sherman, and sculptor Michael Berkowicz. Directed by Michael Engler, performed by Kate Fugeli as the Girl, and sung by three opera singers
1986	Terminal Bar (abandoned car showroom, SoHo)	Written by Paul Selig, directed by Michael Engler, starring Fisher Stevens
1987	Naked Chambers (intersection of Greenwich & Chambers Streets, TriBeCa)	Written by Dick Beebe, starring Richard Gottlieb
1988	3 Pieces for a Warehouse (warehouse, Lower Westside)	by María Irene Fornés, Anna Cassio and Quincy Long
1989	Plays in the Park (Central Park). Krapp's Last Tape (1 Main Street, Brooklyn Waterfront).	Plays including Bad Penny written by Mac Wellman and directed by Jim Simpson Krapp's starring and directed by Paul Zimet of The Talking Band
1990	Father Was a Peculiar Man(Meatpacking District). Crowbar (The Victory, NY).	Father Was a Peculiar Man directed by Reza Abdoh and co-written by Reza Abdoh & Mira-Lani OglesbyCrowbar written by Mac Wellman and directed by Richard Caliban
1991	Another Person Is a Foreign Country (Towers Nursing Home, 455 Central Park West) Occasional Grace (Universalist Church at Central Park West & 76th St)	Another Person written by Charles L. Mee, Jr., directed by Anne Bogart Grace directed by Bill Rauch
1992	Vanquished by Voodoo (façade of the Dwyer Warehouse, Harlem)	Written and directed by Laurie Carlos, featuring Carl Hancock Rux and Viola Sheely
1993	Orestes (Penn Yards)	Adapted by Charles L. Mee Jr., directed by Tina Landau, starring Jefferson Mays and Theresa McCarthy
1994	Marathon Dancing (Grand Ballroom, Masonic Grand Lodge at 71 West 23rd St.) Stonewall: Night Variations (Pier 25 on the Hudson River)	Marathon written by Laura Harrington, directed by Anne Bogart, music by Christopher Drobny, choreography by Alison Shafer Stonewall directed by Tina Landau
1995	J.P. Morgan Saves the Nation (outside Federal Hall National Memorial at the intersection of Wall and Broad Streets, Lower Manhattan)	Book and lyrics by Jeffrey M. Jones, music by Jonathan Larson, directed by Jean Randich, choreography by Doug Elkins
1996	The Trojan Women: A Love Story (East River Park Amphitheater) The Waste Land (Liberty Theatre (New York, New York), 42nd St.)	Trojan Women written by Charles L. Mee Jr., directed by Tina Landau, starring Sharon Scruggs Waste Land directed by Deborah Warner, starring Fiona Shaw
1997	Sweet Thereisenstradt (Archa Theater, Prague)	Based on the diary of Willi Mahler, directed by Damien Gray
1998	Mystery School (Angel Orensanz Foundation Center for the Arts, 172 Norfolk St., SoHo) Secret History of the Lower East Side (roof of the Seward Park High School, 350 Grand St, Lower East Side)	Mystery School written by Paul Selig, directed by Doug Hughes, music and sound design by David Van Tieghem, starring Tyne Daly Secret History written by Carlos Murillo, Alice Tuan and Peter Ullian, directed by Matthew Wilder
2014	Basetrack Live (Brooklyn Academy of Music)	Created by Edward Bilous, co-adapted by Jason Grote & Seth Bockley & Anne Hamburger, Directed by Seth Bockley, Music Composed by Michelle DiBucci, Edward Bilous and Greg Kalember. (Inspired by the website One-Eight Basetrack, a citizen journalism project featuring the work of Teru Kuwayama, Balazs Gardi and Tivadar Domaniczky)
2015	Big Outdoor Site Specific Stuff (B.O.S.S.S. Fest) (Hudson River Park, NY)	A free festival of work by nine creative teams composed of New York’s rising generation of innovative theatre artists
2016	Wilderness (Abrons Arts Center)	Written by Seth Bockley & Anne Hamburger, Directed by Seth Bockley, Movement by Devon DeMayo & Patrick McCollum, Music by Kyle Miller & Towr's, Kyle Henderson & Desert, Noises and Gregory Alan Isakov, Video by Michael Tutaj, Sound by Mikhail Fiksel, Lighting by Scott Bolman.
2017	Harbored (Winter Garden at Brookfield Place, Lower Manhattan)	Harbored was Co-commissioned by Arts Brookfield and the Lower Manhattan Cultural Council as part of the River to River Festival 2017 Written & Directed by Jimmy Maize, Composed by Heather Christian, Choreographed by Wendy Seyb. Featuring Downtown Voices Choir, Mama Foundation, Wednesday Sings Choir
2018	Red Hills (101 Greenwich Street)	Written by Asiimwe Deborah Kawe and Sean Christopher Lewis, directed by Katie Pearl; with actors Christopher McLinden and Patrick J. Ssenjovu; composition and live music by Farai Malianga and singer Sifiso Mabena; set design by Adam Rigg; lighting design by Brian Aldous & Adam Macks; costume design by Angela M. Fludd; and dramaturgy by Morgan Jenness.
2020	Fandango for Butterflies (And Coyotes) (La MaMa Experimental Theatre Club)	Written by Andrea Thome, directed by José Zayas, original music by Sinuhé Padilla; with actors Carlo Albán, Jen Anaya, Silvia Dionicio, Sinuhé Padilla, Andrés Quintero, Frances Ines Rodriguez, Roberto Tolentino, and Tania Mesa; scenic and projection design by Johnny Moreno; lighting design by Lucrecia Briceno; sound design by Marcelo Añez; costume design by Fabian Fidel Aguilar; and choreography by Alexandra Beller.
2021	A Dozen Dreams (Brookfield Place, 230 Vesey Street NY). Downtown Live (Open Air Spaces in Lower Manhattan).	A Dozen Dreams conceived by Anne Hamburger, John Clinton Eisner and Irina Kruzhilina; written by Sam Chanse, Erika Dickerson-Despenza, Emily Mann, Martyna Majok, Mona Mansour, Rehana Mirza, Ellen McLaughlin, Liza Jessie Peterson, Ren Dara Santiago, Caridad Svich, Lucy Thurber, and Andrea Thome; visual and environment design by Irina Kruzhilina; sound design by Rena Anakwe, video/projection design by Brittany Bland, and lighting design by Jeanette Oi-Suk Yew. Downtown Live (three sites in Lower Manhattan) co-produced with The Tank and presented by the Downtown Alliance. Downtown Live, a performing arts festival comprising 36 in-person outdoor performances, co-presented with the Tank and Downtown Alliance.
2022	Downtown Stories	Sidewalk Echoes by Rogelio Martinez, directed by Johanna McKeon, with actors Sheher Azaad, Lakpa T. Bhutia, Chris Crofton, Ashley Noel Jones, and Jacob Rodriguez. Lighting design by Chris Brown, costume design by Val Ramshur, sound design by UptownWorks, and creative consultation by John Clinton Eisner. Performed at John Street Methodist Church and 1 Battery Park Plaza from June 8 to 25. Uncovering Downtown: A Magical Expedition of Unrecorded Dreams by Mona Monsour and Jessica Holt, directed by Holt. Performed by Michelle J. Rodriguez, costume design by Azalea Fairley, and sound design and engineering by Andrew Lynch. Performed around Bowling Green Park from June 8 to 25. We the People (Not the Bots) written and performed by Eric Lockley, developed and directed by Morgan Green. Costume design by Azalea Fairley, and sound design and engineering by Andrew Lynch. Performed in Manhattan's financial district from June 8 to 30.
2023	Helen (La MaMa Experimental Theatre Club)	by Caitlin George, directed by Violeta Picayo, presented by En Garde Arts, and La MaMa. A new work of the SuperGeographics, led by artistic director Jonathan T. Taylor. With actors Lanxing Fu, Constance Strickland, Grace Bernardo, Melissa Coleman-Reed, Jackie Rivera, Jonathan T. Taylor, and Jessica Frey. Lighting design by Jackie Fox and Connor Sale, set and costume design by James Schuette, sound design by Darron L West, dramaturgy and production by Megan E. Carter, production stage management by Caroline Englander, assistant stage management by Alison Greene, and production management and technical direction by Gabriela Gutierrez. Performed from October 13 to 29.
2024	The Wind and The Rain: A Story About Sunny's Bar (Waterfront Museum in Red Hook, Brooklyn)	Written by Sarah Gancher (Obie winner for this production) and directed by Jared Mezzocchi
2025	Spacebridge (La MaMa Experimental Theatre Club). Seagull: True Story (La MaMa Experimental Theatre Club). Last Call, A Play With Cocktails (staged in 9 real New York apartments).	Spacebridge Conceived and Directed by: Irina Kruzhilina, Written by Clark Young and Irina Kruzhilina, Commissioned in part by the Joan D. Firestone Commission. Seagull Conceived & Directed by Sasha Molochnikov, Written by Eli Rarey. Last Call: A Play with Cocktails created by the artist-led collective The Pack, Written by Hansol Jung, Dramaturgy by Lexy Leuszler, Performed by a rotating cast: Chris Bannow, Esco Jouléy, Dorcas Leung, Brian Quijada, Nicole Villamil, and Mitch Winter.
2026	73 Seconds (64-seat planetarium in the Lower Eastside Girl’s Club)	Created, Written, and Performed by Jared Mezzocchi, Directed and Co-Developed with Aya Ogawa

== Awards ==
Obie Awards (7): Bad Penny (Best New American Play: Mac Wellman) 1990; Bad Penny (Best Direction: Jim Simpson 1990; Crowbar (Performance: Elzbieta Czyzewska) 1990; En Garde Arts (Obie Grant) 1991; Orestes (Performance: Jefferson Mays) 1994; The Trojan Women (Performance: Sharon Scruggs) 1997 The Wind and the Rain: A Story About Sunny's Bar (Playwriting: Sarah Gancher) 2025

Drama Desk Awards (2): The Waste Land (Outstanding One Person Show, Unique Theatrical Experience) 1997

Outer Critics Circle Awards (1): Crowbar (Special Award) 1989-90

Edwin Booth Award, 1995
