= The Crash (Mad Men) =

- Mad Men episode
- Jim Cutler and Stan Rizzo in The Crash
- Episode no.: Season 6 Episode 8
- Directed by: Michael Uppendahl
- Written by: Jason Grote; Matthew Weiner
- Original air date: May 19, 2013
- Running time: 48 minutes

Guest appearances
- James Wolk as Bob Benson

Episode chronology
← Previous "Man with a Plan"	Next → "The Better Half"
- Mad Men season 6

"The Crash" is the eighth episode of the sixth season of the American television drama series Mad Men and the 73rd episode of the series overall. It was written by series creator and executive producer Matthew Weiner and writer Jason Grote, and directed by Michael Uppendahl. It originally aired on AMC in the United States on May 19, 2013.

The episode takes place over a weekend, telling several stories in a non-linear narrative. In it, several main characters at the advertising agency are given a powerful stimulant meant to give them energy while working on the Chevrolet campaign through a weekend. Meanwhile, as Don's children are left at his apartment with Sally to babysit, a stranger enters.

"The Crash" was watched by 2.16 million viewers and achieved 0.8 million viewers in the key 18–49 demographic. It is widely considered to be the show's most experimental episode and was initially met with mixed reviews from television critics. In the years since first airing, however, it has come to be regarded by some as one of the series' greatest episodes.

== Plot ==
"The Crash" follows events in three different settings: Don and the rest of the agency at the office over the weekend, a younger Don during the Depression era, and the Draper children (mostly at Don's apartment).

Ken Cosgrove gets into a car crash with drunken Chevrolet executives. When the agency is informed of yet another unsuccessful Chevrolet pitch, Don says the team will have to work over the weekend. Sylvia calls Don, chastising him for rousing Arnold's suspicions, begging him to stop obsessively pursuing her. Failing to reassure her, Don throws the phone in anger. A strong cough causes Don to flashback to his childhood in a brothel. Feverous, his stepmother Abigail tells him to sleep in the cellar.

Back at the agency, the death of Frank Gleason is mourned. The agency is informed of an energy serum available upstairs that is purported to result in one to three days of "uninterrupted creative focus, energy, and confidence" for those taking it. Don walks in for a dose and exits to find members of the creative team acting highly informally. As Don begins to cough walking downstairs, a flashback begins of young Don going to the cellar but being invited into another room by Aimée, one of the prostitutes living in the house.

At the agency, Don pauses while watching Peggy comfort a bereaved Ted before the stimulant suddenly takes effect. That evening, Don rummages through a magazine pile and asks for Ken. He tells Ken he is confident he can create a winning Chevy ad campaign but needs to see the executives in person to present the work. Ken begins tap dancing during their manic conversation. Don then visits the creative team and gives them an impromptu motivational speech, with Peggy calling his words inspiring but asking for an actual idea.

When walking back to his office, Don is reminded of his past once more. In bed, a young Don is served soup by Aimée. This instantly gives Don an ad idea. Upon visiting the creative team again on Saturday, he is introduced to Wendy, the daughter of the deceased Frank. Don tells Peggy to look in the 1950s archives for a Sterling Cooper account about soup. Don goes back to his office and finds Wendy, who says she is there "to make [him] feel better". He tells her he is busy. She nonetheless walks up to him, gently puts a stethoscope to his heart, and says it's broken. Don at first thinks she means his heart, but she tells him it's the stethoscope itself. He tells her to leave.

Don calls Megan to inform her he will have to work longer. She is angered, having to leave. Sally is told to babysit the children. Meanwhile, Stan is injured in a target-throwing game played by the creative team, and Peggy carries him off. Don arrives at Sylvia's apartment, leans against the door and only hears the song: “Going Out of My Head” by Sérgio Mendes playing on a portable radio. Back at the office, Stan kisses Peggy but is turned down. When he tells her that his cousin Robbie was killed in action, Peggy advises Stan that "you have to let yourself feel [grief]" and that it cannot be dampened with other things. She suggests he go home, but thanks him politely when he makes a sexually suggestive compliment.

Sally hears noises in the apartment and finds a Black woman has entered the living room, claiming to have raised her father and to be named "Ida". Sally remains somewhat skeptical, but the woman pressures her into sitting down to eat some eggs, and begins acquainting herself with Sally. Don meanwhile manages to find the ad he previously asked Peggy to look for in the archives. Instead of soup it’s revealed to be an ad for Granger’s oatmeal. It depicts a boy being served oatmeal by a woman, with the caption, "Because you know what he needs." In a continuation of the flashback, young Don has recovered from his cough. Aimée admits her real name is Amy, then seduces him with the assurance: "I'll do everything." Don, uncomfortable and looking frightened, acquiesces.

Back at the apartment, Ida and Sally are in conversation, with the latter continuing to ask questions. Ida introduces herself to Bobby and asks about a gold watch of Don's that she says she wants to fix. Sally calls the police once Ida leaves the room to look, believing still that the latter is a con woman. Ida enters the room, grabs the phone from Sally, and convinces the police that Sally is simply performing a prank call. She then warns the children to go to sleep.

At the agency, when Peggy and Michael arrive at Don's office, Don says he has an idea. Peggy is frustrated by his inability to articulate it and realizes that Don is focused on something other than Chevy. Don leaves. Peggy finds Jim surreptitiously watching Wendy and Stan having sex in another room. Annoyed, Peggy goes home. Don goes to his own apartment, talking manically to himself and trying to plan a way to talk to Sylvia and win her over. He finds Megan, Betty, Henry, and the children in the living room with the police. Betty scolds Don, who then remembers having left the back door open, for what has occurred. Don then faints. In a final flashback to his past, Amy is kicked out of the house, and Don is viciously beaten by Abigail when she learns that Amy had "taken [his] cherry."

Don later wakes up in his apartment, and Megan apologizes for the earlier events. Don and Sylvia later run into each other on the elevator; both say practically nothing. Don calls Sally from work to tell her he's okay, and assures her that he's "sure she's fooled plenty of adults too." Sally says that she's embarrassed and that she realized that she knows nothing about him. He asks her to forget about the earlier events, admits that he had left the apartment door unlocked, and takes the blame himself. Don visits Ted and Jim. Ted is greatly disappointed in the results of the past 72 hours, noting that Chevy was even spelled wrong in the resulting work. Don refuses to create further work for Chevy, saying he will only evaluate the other creatives' work. When Ted protests, he replies, "Every time we get a car, this place turns into a whorehouse." Ted and Jim watch Don silently and blankly as he goes back to his office and shuts the door.

== Production ==
Kevin Rahm, who plays Ted Chaough, notes that Gleason's death has a strong impact on his character, as the former was "the guy that he could bitch to, and that he could yell at and with, and he was his rock". Weiner, the show's creator, said that such serums as the agency was injected with were well known in the 1960s and that the substances heightens one's sense of time's passage. He also discusses the theme in the episode of sex as escape from trauma.

== Reception ==
=== Critical reception ===
Upon its initial airing, television critics' reviews for "The Crash" were mixed to negative. Its departure from the standard Mad Men episode structure was described as the boldest yet, and many found it off-putting. Matt Zoller Seitz wrote, "I’m convinced that metafiction/jazzing around is the only prism through which “The Crash” is anything other than audaciously annoying. More so than any Mad Men episode I can recall, it doesn't quite feel like a Mad Men episode, but a bunch of half-formed ideas for a Mad Men episode". While praising the episode's humor, Seitz criticized the subplot with the African-American burglar in Don's house, viewing it as part of a pattern in the show of minorities being disappointingly uninteresting characters. He also considered the flashbacks to Don's past to be poorly edited and written, and felt that their intended message had already been established by that point in the show's run. Maureen Ryan of The Huffington Post argued that the episode "was amped up and yet often came off as filler", also disparaging the flashbacks as "embarrassingly thin, predictable slices of melodrama in a show that, at its best, embraces complex, thoughtful ambiguity."

Alan Sepinwall was mixed, writing that much of the episode "was memorable, and a lot of it was funny – even before Ken started tapping and rapping, we got Don shouting about the timbre of his voice and being uncertain about whether he would be “forceful or submissive” (clearly still having last week's games with Sylvia on his mind) – but a lot of it played like parody: This is “Mad Men.” Now this is “Mad Men” on drugs. Any questions?" He predicted as a result that he would remember the episode chiefly for its unconventionality. Jenny Lower of Los Angeles magazine argued, "Where Roger’s acid trip became a plot device for him and Jane to reveal unspoken truths, it’s unclear exactly what this episode accomplished." Sarene Leeds of Rolling Stone similarly wrote, "If there was anything I learned from "The Crash" – other than Aaron Staton does a mean soft shoe – it was that I'd much rather watch Roger get high." Tim Goodman of The Hollywood Reporter said, "As a one-off experiment, it’s hard to fault [Matthew Weiner] for trying. A series creator should be allowed that. But I hope Dr. Hecht and his needles don’t show up again any time soon."

In The A.V. Club, however, Emily St. James assigned the website's highest grade (A) to "The Crash" and interpreted it as "an episode of Mad Men that’s about writing Mad Men, about locking yourself in a room and driving yourself crazy to come up with that one perfect idea, about wasting a weekend on that process, about trying to top yourself and feeling like you’re losing your mind." She considered no other television episode from the 2013-14 season to be more thought-provoking, and opined, "The whole thing is like a bunch of strands of yarn, lying parallel to each other, and then a cat comes through and starts knocking them around, because it was promised a ball of yarn, and it’s not going to go home without it." Slate magazine's Seth Stevenson identified vulnerability as its overriding theme, and questioned whether "the amphetamine clockwork of the episode—skies flickering dark then light, days whirring together—[was] meant to evoke the frightening velocity of the era". Paul MacInnes of The Guardian called it "a grand episode" and praised the writers' ability to make "the viewer [feel] as if they're on drugs too."

In 2014, a year after it first aired, Oliver Lyttelton of IndieWire ranked "The Crash" as one of the series' best entries and wrote, "The episode proved highly divisive when it aired, with some finding it empty and pretentious, but further rewatches have made clear that it’s anything but." Kyle Russell of Business Insider and Verne Gay of Newsday also listed the episode as a series highlight, with the latter lauding it as "a glory of comedy, writing, direction and sheer nuttiness." In the International Business Times, Alex Garofalo ranked "The Crash" as second only to "The Suitcase" among Mad Men episodes, hailing it as "an experimental high for the series" and a "manic fever dream of an episode" in which "each character aggressively numbed his or her personal pain." It was also ranked the show's ninth best episode in a poll of Entertainment Weekly staff, with Keith Staskiewicz comparing it to the works of David Lynch.

=== Ratings ===
The episode was viewed by 2.16 million viewers on the night of its original airing. It drew 0.8 million viewers in the 18–49 demographic.
