= Pamela Howard =

English theatre designer and scenographer (1939–2026)

Pamela Howard (5 January 1939 – 26 October 2026) was an English theatre designer and scenographer. She designed sets for the National Theatre and the Royal Shakespeare Company. She died on 26 October 2026, aged 87.

== Books ==
What is Scenography (2002)
