= Caleb Wertenbaker =

Caleb Wertenbaker is a scenic designer, known for his work with opera and regional theatre companies in the US.

== Early life and education ==
In 1996, Wertenbaker graduated from Oberlin College with a dual-degree in Theatre History and English. In his time there, he received the Nash Award for Contribution to Student Theater. Wertenbaker received his master's degree in Scenography from the Central Saint Martins College of Art and Design in London, England in 2000, under the tutelage of Pete Brooks. During this time he also studied under Jan Dusheck at DAMU in Prague.

== Career ==
Wertenbaker is known for his work with regional companies, especially those in and around Boston, Massachusetts. He has repeatedly designed for the New England Conservatory of Music (La Calisto, The Magic Flute, Cendrillon), the American Repertory Theatre Institute (The Bacchae, Love's Labors Lost, The Women of Troy), and the Concord Academy (Alice in Wonderland, Dido and Aeneas, Bear Spot) as well as numerous other regional theaters and a variety of theater festivals including the New York Musical Theatre Festival in New York City and an international festival tour with ArKtype Productions (Addicted to Bad Ideas).

Wertenbaker's work has received many positive reviews. The Village Voice called his designs "elegant", and Denver Westword Arts deemed his sets "sophisticated." Although he is known mainly as a scenic designer, Wertenbaker has also produced work in many areas of technical theatrical work, including lighting design, costume design, projections, and production management. He has also served as an art director and production designer for several films, including The Raft (2008), and Loosing It (2010).

Wertenbaker was a visiting lecturer at Mount Holyoke College in 2002.
