= Anne Hamburger =

American theatre manager

- Born: c. 1954
- Occupations: theatre manager, producer, playwright
- Known for: Founder of En Garde Arts; Walt Disney Creative Entertainment Executive

Anne Hamburger (born c. 1954) is an American theatre manager, producer and playwright. She founded En Garde Arts, was artistic director of La Jolla Playhouse and was also an executive at Walt Disney Creative Entertainment, producing musicals.

== Life and career ==
Hamburger was born in Baltimore, Maryland. She began her career as a sculptor, photographer, and performance artist, and started acting with Saratoga International Theater Institute (SITI). She then studied at Yale School of Drama, where she started a site-specific theatre company as part of her Master's studies.

Hamburger founded and led En Garde Arts from 1986 until 1999. The company put on large site-specific performances across New York City at venues including Bow Bridge (Central Park) and Hotel Chelsea. Hamburger and the company won six Obie Awards. She has also won two Drama Desk Awards. In a 1994 article in The New York Times, Hamburger described the extensive process needed to obtain permission from property owners and the city to present performances at locations throughout the city.

She was then named artistic director of La Jolla Playhouse in San Diego, California, and after one year moved on to become executive vice president for Walt Disney Creative Entertainment. She produced spectacles and stage shows for the Disney parks and cruise ships, including Disney's Aladdin: A Musical Spectacular and Finding Nemo – The Musical.

After eight years at Disney, Hamburger restarted En Garde Arts and returned to producing off-Broadway theatre. In 2015, she presented a theater festival in Hudson River Park with nine separate pieces, including one by the Obie-winner Lee Sunday Evans. In 2017, she produced and co-wrote the play Wilderness which explored the issues created by sending children on wilderness therapy camps. While developing Wilderness, Hamburger spent time with youths in Utah at a wilderness therapy camp and conducted interviews with parents who had to send their children to such camps.

Hamburger curated a free performing arts festival in New York City in May 2021.
