= Sarah Marshall (American stage actress) =

American actress

Sarah Marshall (born 1955) is a stage actress working primarily in the Washington, D.C. region. She has been nominated for the Helen Hayes Award seventeen times and won the award in 1989.

== Early life and education ==
Marshall was born in Kansas, the fifth of eight children in a Catholic military family. During her childhood, she lived in several places in the South. Most of her family currently resides in the south.

As a child, Marshall and her siblings produced plays at their home. Marshall decided to become an actress in the seventh grade after winning a citywide monologue competition in Huntsville, Alabama. Playing the comedic role of the maid in her middle school's production of Junior Miss led her to focus on character acting. She acted throughout high school and college, graduating from Birmingham–Southern College with a degree in theater.

== Career beginnings ==
Marshall moved to Washington with the intent of attending graduate school at Catholic University or American University, but enrolled in classes at the Studio Theatre Acting Conservatory instead, working as a maid to support herself. During the 1980s, Marshall performed in nine Studio Theatre productions, including a 1983 role as Jo, a pregnant waif in Shelagh Delaney's A Taste of Honey, termed Marshall's "breakthrough performance" by friend and Studio Theatre Artistic Director Joy Zinoman. She also drew attention for her roles in Studio Theatre's Miss Margarida's Way and My Sister is in This House, for which she received her first Helen Hayes nomination.

Other productions in which she performed during that time included Briar Patch at Arena Stage; The Stick Wife at Horizons; The Vampires at Woolly Mammoth Theatre Company; and Baby with the Bathwater at Round House Theatre in 1989, for which she won the Helen Hayes Award for Outstanding Supporting Actress in a Resident Production. She joined the Woolly Mammoth acting company in 1989.

== Recent performances ==
Marshall's recent productions include Dead Man's Cell Phone at Woolly Mammoth in 2007; Martha, Josie and the Chinese Elvis at Woolly Mammoth and The Prime of Miss Jean Brodie, featuring Marshall in the title role, at Studio Theatre in 2006; and Camille at Round House Theatre and The Clean House at Woolly Mammoth in 2005, for which she received her fourteenth Helen Hayes nomination.

== Other activities ==
Marshall began teaching acting at Round House Theater in 1985. Since 1988, she has taught at the Duke Ellington School of the Arts. She is also an adjunct drama instructor at Georgetown University. In her spare time, Marshall has dabbled in crafts such as drawing, metal work and pottery.

== Helen Hayes Awards ==
1985	Outstanding Lead Actress in a Resident Production	
	My Sister in This House, The Studio Theatre	Nomination
1989	Outstanding Supporting Actress, Resident Production	
	Baby With the Bathwater, Round House Theatre	Award Recipient
1990	Outstanding Lead Actress, Resident Production	
	Dead Monkey, Woolly Mammoth Theatre Company	Nomination
1990	Outstanding Supporting Actress, Resident Production	
	Briar Patch, Arena Stage	Nomination
1992	Outstanding Lead Actress, Resident Production	
	When I Was a Girl I Used to Scream and Shout, The Studio Theatre	Nomination
1993	Outstanding Lead Actress, Resident Play	
	Elektra, Round House Theatre	Nomination
1994	Outstanding Lead Actress, Resident Play	
	Criminals in Love, Round House Theatre	Nomination
1996	Outstanding Lead Actress, Resident Musical	
	Wanted, Woolly Mammoth Theatre Company	Nomination
1996	Outstanding Lead Actress, Resident Play	
	Escape from Happiness, Round House Theatre	Nomination
1998	Outstanding Lead Actress, Resident Play	
	Sylvia, The Studio Theatre	Nomination
2000	Outstanding Lead Actress, Resident Play	
	Dead Monkey, Woolly Mammoth Theatre Company	Nomination
2000	Outstanding Supporting Actress, Resident Play	
	How I Learned to Drive, Arena Stage	Nomination
2001	Outstanding Supporting Actress, Resident Play	
	Betty's Summer Vacation, The Studio Theatre	Nomination
2006	Outstanding Supporting Actress, Resident Play	
	The Clean House, Woolly Mammoth Theatre Company	Nomination
2008	Outstanding Supporting Actress, Resident Play	
	As You Like It, Folger Theatre	Nomination
2009	Outstanding Supporting Actress, Resident Play	
	Boom, Woolly Mammoth Theatre Company	Nomination (award not yet announced)
2009	Outstanding Lead Actress, Resident Play	
	Maria/Stuart, Woolly Mammoth Theatre Company	Nomination (award not yet announced)
