= Bridget Breiner =

American dancer and choreographer

Bridget Breiner (born 1974) is an American dancer and choreographer. Since 1991, she lives and works mainly in Germany.

Breiner was born in Connecticut and brought up in Columbus, Ohio, where she received her early dance training. At 17, she furthered her dance studies in Munich, Germany, at the Heinz Bosl Foundation. Her first engagement was with the Bayerisches Staatsballett before she joined the Stuttgart Ballet in 1996 and became First Soloist there in 2001. Between 2006 and 2008, Breiner was a member of the Semperoper Ballet.

Since 2008, she was artist-in-residence at the Stuttgart Ballet, but she also worked as a freelance choreographer. In the 2012/13 season, she became artistic director of ballet at the Musiktheater im Revier in Gelsenkirchen where she created the choreography for the world premiere of Charlotte Salomon: Der Tod und die Malerin. In the 2019/2020 season, she moved to become ballet director of Badisches Staatstheater Karlsruhe.

Breiner received the German theatre award Der Faust in 2013 and 2015.
