= Musiktheater im Revier =

Coordinates: 51°30′51″N 7°5′28″E

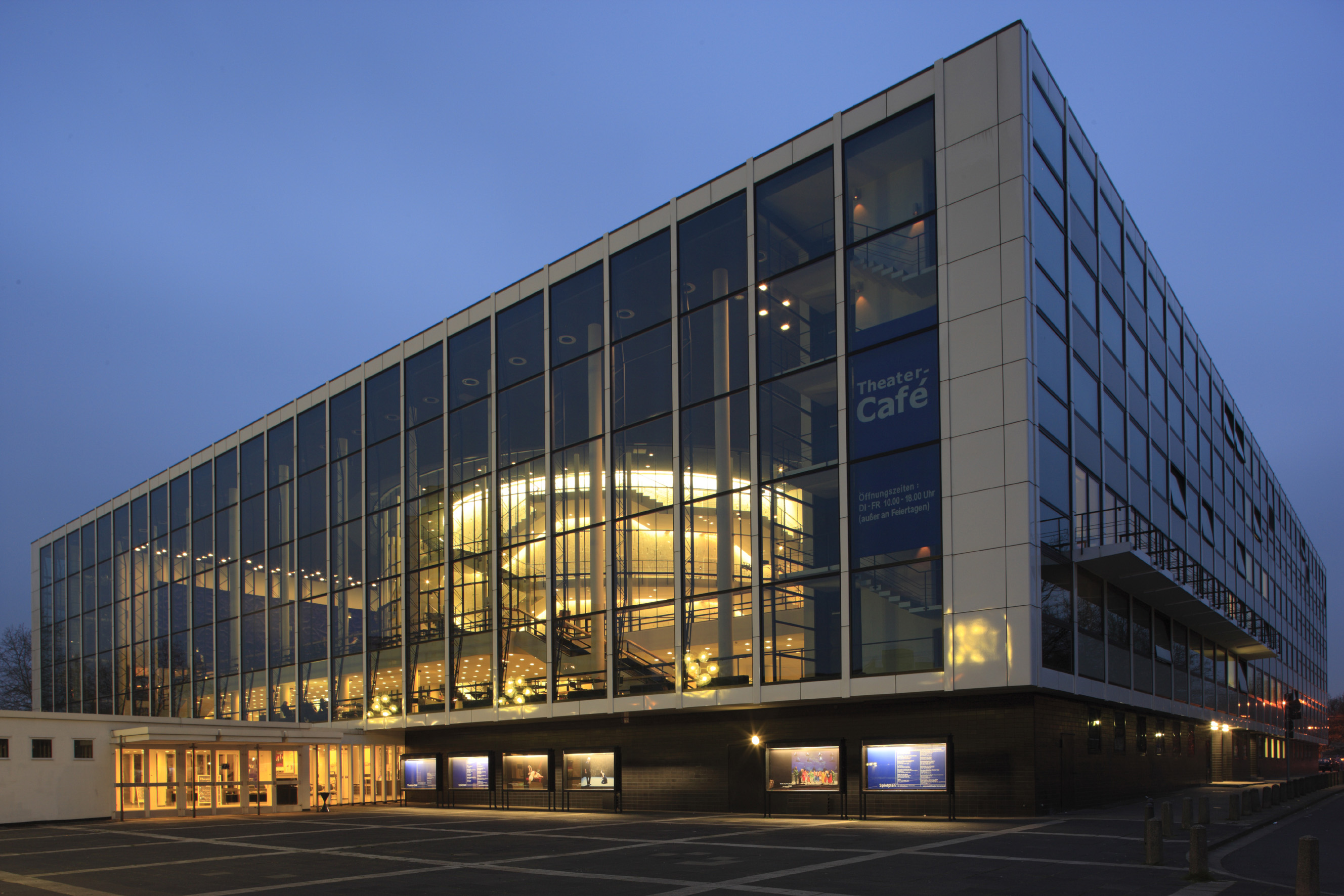
- Musiktheater im Revier at night
- Interactive map of Musiktheater im Revier
- Location: Gelsenkirchen, North Rhine-Westphalia, Germany

Construction
- Opened: 1959
- Architect: Werner Ruhnau

Website
- www.musiktheater-im-revier.de

Musiktheater im Revier (MiR) (Music Theatre in the Ruhr) is the venue for performing opera, operetta, musical theatre and ballet in Gelsenkirchen, North Rhine-Westphalia, Germany. It opened on 15 December 1959; it is listed since 1997 as a protected cultural monument.

The building offers two performance spaces: the Large House (Großes Haus) with 1,008 seats and about 200 performances per year, and the Small House (Kleines Haus) with 336 seats and about 120 annual performances. In contrast to the building's outside cubic appearance, the auditoria use a more curved design.

== Design ==
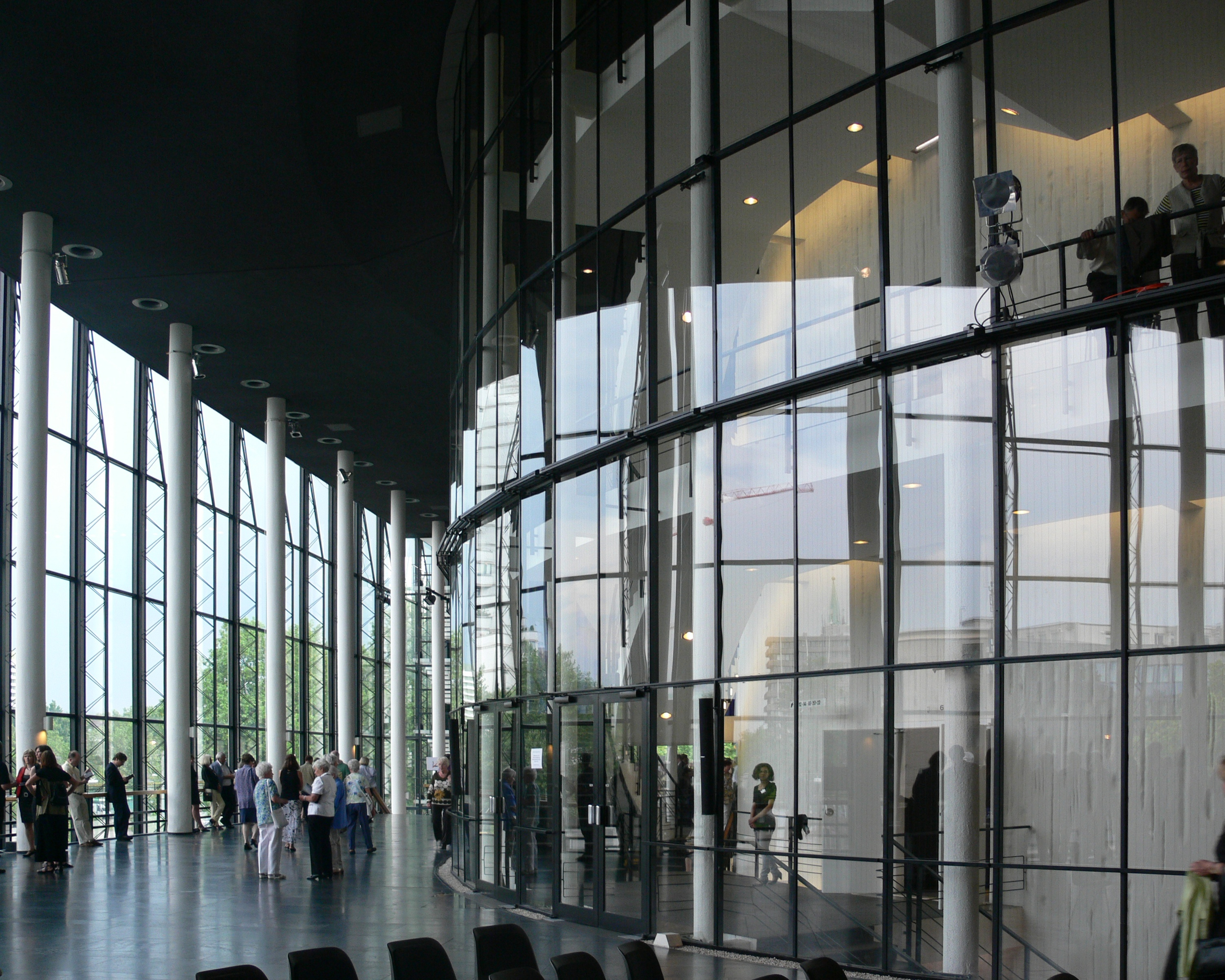
Foyer

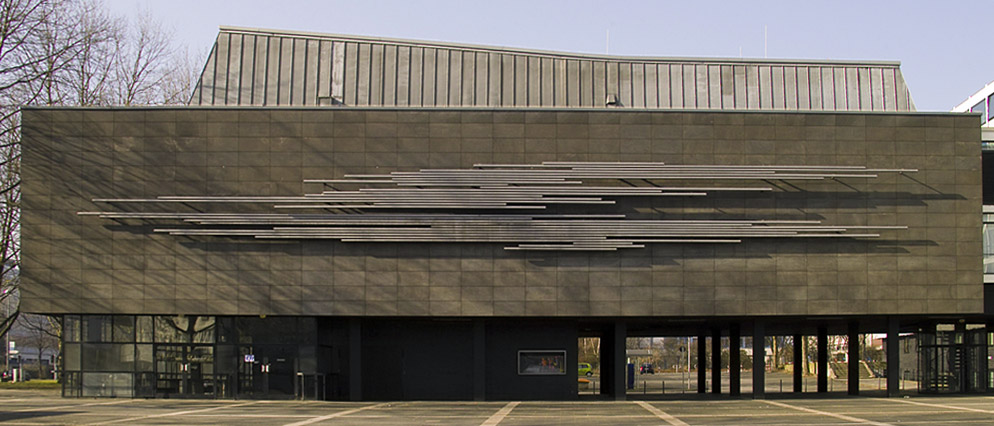
Sculpture on the Small House by Norbert Kricke

The building was designed by the German architect Werner Ruhnau. The cubic outer shell of the Large House is formed by a 4,500 square metres (48,000 sq ft) glass facade, which gives view into the interior and the cylindric casing of the auditorium and its stairways, and the two monumental sculptures by the French artist Yves Klein.

They consist of one 7×20 m (23×66 ft) monochrome sponge sculpture in a distinctive blue ("Gelsenkirchen Blue") because Klein's International Klein Blue was unsuitable for the large walls: the acetone-based mixture evaporated, the paint lost adhesion and luminescence, and it was highly flammable. A second, slightly smaller work, is in blue and white. These intensely blue reliefs, which are visible from the outside through the glass skin of the building, inspired the city's graphic artist, Uwe Gelesch, to introduce blue as Gelsenkirchen's house colour. The Small House features a mobile by Jean Tinguely. The building served as a location for the 1961 film The Miracle of Father Malachia by Bernhard Wicki.

== Music theatre ==
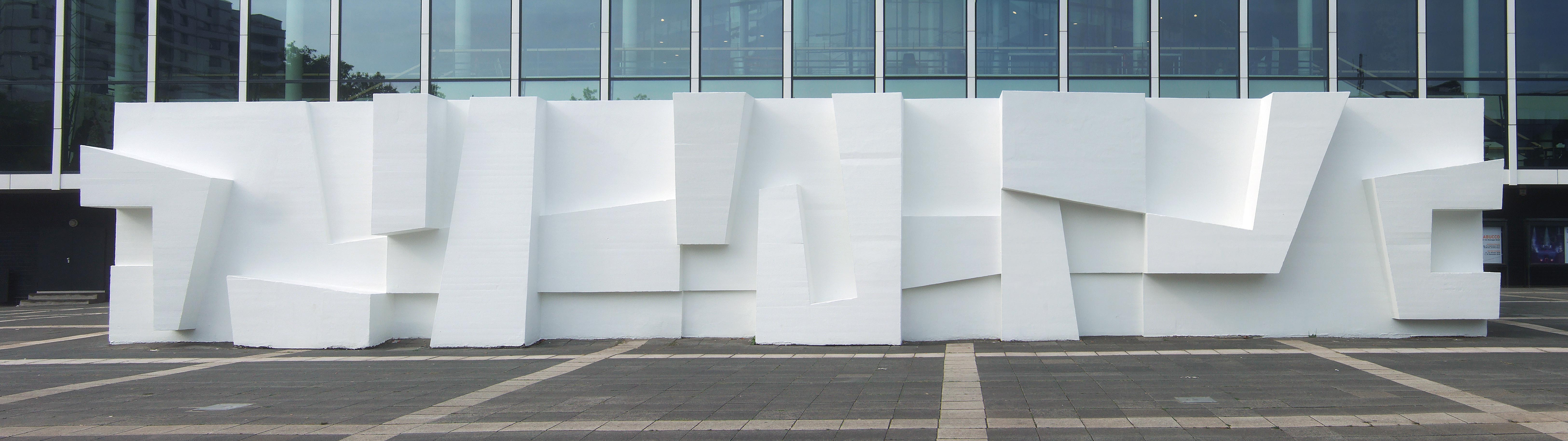
Sculpture on the Large House by Robert Adams

When the theatre opened in 1959, it provided also for the spoken theatre, a typical German Drei-Sparten-Theater (three performing arts theater: opera, ballet, plays). Austerity measures in 1966/67 forced the abandonment of plays.

Like most German municipal theatres (Stadttheater), the Musiktheater im Revier employs its own opera company and chorus and a ballet company under the direction of Bridget Breiner. The house orchestra is the Neue Philharmonie Westfalen, the largest of the three state orchestras in North Rhine-Westphalia. The orchestra is funded by the cities of Gelsenkirchen and Recklinghausen and the district of Unna. Johannes Kalitzke was chief conductor from 1984 to 1990. Heiko Mathias Förster is the current music director.

In 1968, Bernd Alois Zimmermann's work Photoptosis was premiered at the Musiktheater im Revier. The first performance of Albert Lortzing's 1899 opera Regina which used the composer's original libretto took place at the MiR in 1998. On 10 October 2003, Alexander Mullenbach's chamber opera Die Todesbrücke (The Death Bridge) saw its premiere here. Enjott Schneider composed a musical for the occasion of the 100th anniversary in 2004 of the Gelsenkirchen soccer team FC Schalke 04 (spoken: Schalke nullvier) which was premiered on 9 May 2004. The title Nullvier – Keiner kommt an Gott vorbei! with a double meaning was translated by the composer to Zerofour: Nobody comes past God, but might be rendered also as "04 – Nobody Outdribbles God!". The musical Strike Up the Band by George Gershwin saw its German premiere at the MiR in 2007 as had the German language production of his opera Porgy and Bess in 1970.
