= Green ghost (disambiguation) =

Green Ghost is a boardgame.

Green ghost or Green Ghost may also refer to:

- A ghost that is green
- Slimer from Ghostbusters, marketed as The Green Ghost
- A short-lived name of the wrestler Crash Holly
- An alternative title of the film The Unholy Night
- A character created by Johnston McCulley
- An alternative name for the Ghost in Nedor Comics
- A superhero from the comic book Invincible

== See also ==
- The Green Ghost Project, a 2010 album by Style P and DJ Green Lantern
- No. 93 Squadron RAAF, nicknamed Green Ghost Squadron
