= Johnston McCulley bibliography =

The following is a list of works by Johnston McCulley (1883–1958). Stories featuring his more popular pulp fiction characters, including Zorro, have been allotted independent lists. These lists are presented chronologically. The list of his other works is presented alphabetically.

== Works featuring his pulp characters ==
=== The Avenging Twins ===
- "The Avenging Twins", Detective Story Magazine, May 12 1923, short story
- "The Avenging Twins Try Again", Detective Story Magazine, June 16–30, 1923, serial
- "The Avenging Twins' Third Trick", Detective Story Magazine, August 25 – September 8, 1923, serial
- "Pearls of Great Price", Detective Story Magazine, November 10, 1923, short story
- "The Avenging Twins' Fifth Victim", Detective Story Magazine, February 23, 1924, short story
- "The Avenging Twins' Last Bow", Detective Story Magazine, April 5–12, 1924, serial
- "The Avenging Twins Return", Detective Story Magazine, October 17, 1925, short story
- "The Avenging Twins Collect", Detective Story Magazine, May 2, 1926, short story

=== The Bat ===
- "The Bat Strikes", Popular Detective, November 1934, short story
- "Bite of the Bat", Popular Detective, December 1934, short story
- "Shadow of the Bat", Popular Detective, January 1935, short story
- "Code of the Bat", Popular Detective, February 1935, short story

=== Black Star ===
- "Rogue for a Day", Detective Story Magazine, March 5 1916, short story
- "Black Star's Defiance", Detective Story Magazine, June 20 1916, short story
- "Black Star’s Subterfuge", Detective Story Magazine, October 5 1916, novelette
- "Black Star's Revenge", Detective Story Magazine, November 5 1916, short story
- "Black Star's Masquerade", Detective Story Magazine, December 20 1916, short story
- "Black Star's Mistake", Detective Story Magazine, February 5, February 20 1917, serial segment
- "Black Star’s Return", Detective Story Magazine, October 2 1917, short story
- "Black Star’s Rebuke", Detective Story Magazine, October 23 1917, short story
- "Black Star's Serenade", Detective Story Magazine, November 27 1917, short story
- "Black Star's Raid", Detective Story Magazine, December 11 1917, short story
- "Black Star's Hobby", Detective Story Magazine, January 29 1918, short story
- "The Defeat of Black Star", Detective Story Magazine, February 26 1918, short story
- "Black Star’s Campaign", Detective Story Magazine, January 14 – February 4 1919, 6 part serial
- "Black Star Comes Back", Detective Story Magazine, January 8 – January 22 1921, 3 part serial
- "Black Star on the Air", Detective Story Magazine, March 3 – March 17 1928, 3 part serial
- "Black Star Back- and How", Detective Story Magazine, November 1 – November 13 1930, 3 part serial
- "Rogue for a Day", Best Detective Magazine, June 1930, short story [reprint of first story]

=== The Crimson Clown ===
- "The Crimson Clown", Detective Story Magazine, July 31 1926, novelette
- "The Crimson Clown is Cornered", Detective Story Magazine, August 21 1926, short story
- "The Crimson Clown's Competitors", Detective Story Magazine, September 4 1926, short story
- "The Crimson Clown Pursues Himself", Detective Story Magazine, September 18 1926, novelette
- "The Crimson Clown's Dumb Friend", Detective Story Magazine, April 23, 1927, short story
- "The Crimson Clown's Treasure Hunt", Detective Story Magazine, June 18 1927, short story
- "The Crimson Clown's Blackmail Trail", Detective Story Magazine, October 29 1927, short story
- "The Crimson Clown's Double", Detective Story Magazine, December 24 1927, short story
- "The Crimson Clown's Winged Loot", Detective Story Magazine, February 18 1928, short story
- "The Crimson Clown's Matinee", Detective Story Magazine, September 29 1928, short story
- "The Crimson Clown Scores with a Snore", Detective Story Magazine, November 3 1928, short story
- "Thubway Tham Meets The Crimson Clown", Detective Story Magazine, serialized November 11 1928 thru December 9 1928
- "The Crimson Clown Faces Murder", Detective Story Magazine, May 25 1929, short story
- "The Crimson Clown's Return", Detective Story Magazine, October 18 1930, short story
- "The Crimson Clown – Avenger", Detective Story Magazine, November 29 1930, short story
- "The Crimson Clown's Threat", Detective Story Magazine, May 2 1931, short story
- "The Crimson Clown's Romance", Detective Story Magazine, May 16 1931, short story
- "The Crimson Clown", Best Detective Magazine, September 1936, short story [reprint of first story]
- "The Crimson Clown’s Return", Popular Detective, October 1944, novelette

=== The Green Ghost ===
- "The Green Ghost", Thrilling Detective, March 1934, novelette
- "The Day of Settlement", Thrilling Detective, May 1934, short story
- "Swift Revenge", Thrilling Detective, June 1934, short story
- "The Green Ghost Stalks", Thrilling Detective, September 1934, short story
- "The Murder Note", Thrilling Detective, January 1935, novelette
- "Deadly Peril", Thrilling Detective, June 1935, novelette
- "Bloodstained Bonds", Thrilling Detective, July 1935, short story

=== Man in Purple ===
- "The Man in Purple", Detective Story Magazine, October 1 1921, short story
- "The Man in Purple Meets a Man in Blue", Detective Story Magazine, November 5 1921, short story
- "Breath of Disaster", Detective Story Magazine, December 10 1921, short story

=== The Mongoose ===
- "Alias the Mongoose", Detective Fiction Weekly, March 26 1932, short story
- "The Voice from Nowhere", Detective Fiction Weekly, April 23 1932, short story
- "The Mongoose Strikes Again", Detective Fiction Weekly, May 7 1932, short story
- "Smoke of Revenge", Detective Fiction Weekly, September 3 1932, short story
- "Jewels of the Rajah", Detective Fiction Weekly, September 17 1932, short story
- "Ransom for Vengeance", Detective Fiction Weekly, November 26 1932, short story
- "Six Sacks of Gold", Detective Fiction Weekly, February 4 1932, short story
- "Profit for the Mongoose", Detective Fiction Weekly, February 25 1933, short story
- "Trap of the Mongoose", Detective Fiction Weekly, May 27 1933, short story

=== Richard Hughes: Railroad Detective ===
- "The Light that Shone and Disappeared", Railroad Man’s Magazine, May 1908, short story
- "When the Wires Bore the Call for Help through the Blizzard", Railroad Man’s Magazine, July 1908, short story
- "The Double Bluff when Shorty Tried to Get Square with the Man Who Sent Him Up", Railroad Man’s Magazine, August 1908, short story
- "The Man on the Pilot Engine and the Battle at the Switch", Railroad Man’s Magazine, September 1908, short story
- "The Secret Service Man Unearths a Piece of Corporation Villainy and Learns the Meaning of Gratitude", Railroad Man’s Magazine, October 1908, short story
- "His Hour of Peril when Crime Stalked through the Freight-Yards", Railroad Man’s Magazine, June 1908, short story

=== The Spider ===
- "The Spider's Den", Detective Story Magazine, April 16 1918, short story
- "The Spider's Sign", Detective Story Magazine, May 21 1918, short story
- "Into the Spider’s Jaws", Detective Story Magazine, July 2 1918, short story
- "The Shekel of Shame", Detective Story Magazine, July 23 1918, short story
- "The Turquoise Elephant", Detective Story Magazine, August 13 1918, short story
- "The Spider's Venom", Detective Story Magazine, September 10 1918, short story
- "The Spider's Debt", Detective Story Magazine, September 24 1918, short story
- "The Spider's Wrath", Detective Story Magazine, October 22 1918, short story
- "The House of Horror", Detective Story Magazine, November 12 1918, short story
- "The Spider's Command", Detective Story Magazine, December 17 1918, short story
- "The Spider's Strain", Detective Story Magazine, April 8 1919, novella
- "The Spider's Reward", Detective Story Magazine, April 29 1919, short story

=== Thubway Tham ===
- "Thubway Tham" Detective Story Magazine, Jun 4 1918, short story
- "Thubway Tham’s Rival", Detective Story Magazine, Jun 11 1918, short story
- "Thubway Tham’s Romance", Detective Story Magazine, Jul 9 1918, short story
- "Thubway Tham’s Act of Mercy", Detective Story Magazine, Jul 30 1918, short story
- "Thubway Tham’s Income Tax", Detective Story Magazine, Oct 29 1918, short story
- "Thubway Tham's Inthane Moment", Detective Story Magazine, November 19 1918, short story
- "Thubway Tham's Thanksgiving Dinner", Detective Story Magazine, November 26 1918, short story
- "Thubway Tham’s Double", Detective Story Magazine, Dec 3 1918, short story
- "Thubway Tham’s Merry Christmas", Detective Story Magazine, Dec 24 1918, short story
- "Thubway Tham's Understudy", Detective Story Magazine, December 31 1918, short story
- "Thubway Tham’s Triumph", Detective Story Magazine, Jan 7 1919, novella
- "Thubway Tham and Elevated Elmer", Detective Story Magazine, March 4 1919, short story
- "Thubway Tham's Baggage Check", Detective Story Magazine, March 25 1919, short story
- "Thubway Tham, Philanthropist", Detective Story Magazine, April 1 1919, short story
- "Thubway Tham’s Inthuranthe", Detective Story Magazine, Apr 15 1919, short story
- "Thubway Tham’s Holdup", Detective Story Magazine, April 22 1919, short story
- "Thubway Tham’s Bank Account", Detective Story Magazine, May 27 1919, short story
- "Thubway Tham’s Vacation", Detective Story Magazine, Jun 10 1919, short story
- "Thubway Tham's Gloriouth Fourth", Detective Story Magazine, July 8 1919, short story
- "Thubway Tham’s Flivver", Detective Story Magazine, Jul 15 1919, short story
- "Thubway Tham, Fashion Plate", Detective Story Magazine, Oct 7 1919, short story
- "Thubway Tham's Inthult", Detective Story Magazine, October 21 1919, short story
- "Thubway Tham’s Preth Agent", Detective Story Magazine, Nov 25 1919, short story
- "Thubway Tham Rides in Style", Detective Story Magazine. Jan 6 1920, short story
- "Thubway Tham’s Darkest Day", Detective Story Magazine, Jan 27 1920, short story
- "Thubway Tham’s Thympathy", Detective Story Magazine, Mar 30 1920, short story
- "Thubway Tham’s Birthday", Detective Story Magazine, Apr 13 1920, short story
- "Thubway Tham’s Four Queens", Detective Story Magazine, May 25 1920, short story
- "Thubway Tham’s Thenthe of Honor", Detective Story Magazine, Jun 1 1920, short story
- "Thubway Tham in the Movies", Detective Story Magazine, Jun 15 1920, short story
- "Thubway Tham’s Tobacco Heart", Detective Story Magazine, Jul 27 1920, short story
- "Thubway Tham, Optimitht", Detective Story Magazine, Aug 24 1920, short story
- "Thubway Tham’s Revenge", Detective Story Magazine, Oct 5 1920, short story
- "Thubway Tham Playth Thanta Clauth", Detective Story Magazine, Dec 25 1920, novella
- "Thubway Tham Getth Bail", Detective Story Magazine, Feb 12 1921, short story
- "Thubway Tham’s Operation", Detective Story Magazine, Mar 12 1921, short story
- "Thubway Tham’s Legathy", Detective Story Magazine, Apr 30 1921, short story
- "Thubway Tham’s Fithing Trip", Detective Story Magazine, May 28 1921, short story
- "Thubway Tham, Delegate", Detective Story Magazine, Jun 11 1921, short story
- "Thubway Tham Meetth a Girl", Detective Story Magazine, Jun 18 1921, short story
- "Thubway Tham and Cupid", Detective Story Magazine, Aug 6 1921, short story
- "Thubway Tham’s Engagement", Detective Story Magazine, Aug 20 1921, short story
- "Thubway Tham’s Jealouthy", Detective Story Magazine, Sep 17 1921, short story
- "Thubway Tham’s Dithilluthionment", Detective Story Magazine, Oct 15 1921, short story
- "Thubway Tham Goeth to the Ratheth", Detective Story Magazine, Oct 29 1921, short story
- "Thubway Tham’s Hoodoo Roll", Detective Story Magazine, Nov 12 1921, short story
- "Thubway Tham's Chrithtmath", Detective Story Magazine, December 24 1921, short story
- "Thubway Tham’s Curiothity", Detective Story Magazine, Jan 7 1922, short story
- "Thubway Tham Reformth", Detective Story Magazine, Feb 11 1922, short story
- "Thubway Tham Meets Mr. Clackworthy", Detective Story Magazine, February 18 1922, short story
- "Thubway Tham, April Fool", Detective Story Magazine, Apr 1 1922, short story
- "Thubway Tham’s Dog", Detective Story Magazine, Jul 1 1922, short story
- "Thubway Tham’th Apprentithe", Detective Story Magazine, Sep 30 1922, short story
- "Thubway Tham’th Honethty", Detective Story Magazine, Oct 21 1922, short story
- "Thubway Tham’th Better Thelf", Detective Story Magazine, Nov 25 1922, short story
- "Thubway Tham’th Chrithmath Thpirit", Detective Story Magazine, Dec 23 1922, short story
- "Thubway Tham’th Buthinethth Thlump", Detective Story Magazine, Jan 20 1923, short story
- "Thubway Tham’th Jury Thervithe", Detective Story Magazine, Feb 10 1923, short story
- "Thubway Tham’th Honetht Hundred", Detective Story Magazine, Mar 10 1923, short story
- "Thubway Tham Dons a Dinner Jacket", Detective Story Magazine, Oct 27 1923, short story
- "Thubway Tham’th Thure Thing", Detective Story Magazine, Nov 17 1923, short story
- "Thubway Tham Gets a Mud Pack", Detective Story Magazine, Mar 8 1924, short story
- "Thubway Tham’th Thcoop", Detective Story Magazine, Mar 22 1924, short story
- "Thubway Tham Consults a Doctor", Detective Story Magazine, Jul 26 1924, short story
- "Thubway Tham’s Brother in Affliction", Detective Story Magazine, Sep 13 1924, short story
- "Thubway Tham, Hero", Detective Story Magazine, Nov 1 1924, short story
- "Thubway Tham’s Tough Day", Detective Story Magazine, Nov 29 1924, short story
- "Thubway Tham’s Word of Honor", Detective Story Magazine, Dec 27 1924, short story
- "Thubway Tham Meetth Elevated Elmer", Detective Story Magazine, Jun 13 1925, novella
- "Thubway Tham and Simon Trapp’s Trap", Detective Story Magazine, Jun 27 1925, short story
- "Thubway Tham’s Underground Loyalty", Detective Story Magazine, Jul 4 1925, short story
- "Thubway Tham’s Crothword Puthle", Detective Story Magazine, Aug 29 1925, short story
- "Thubway Tham Plays", Detective Story Magazine, Sep 12 1925, short story
- "Thubway Tham’s Labor of Love", Detective Story Magazine, Oct 24 1925, short story
- "Get Your Hair Cut", Detective Story Magazine, Nov 28 1925, short story
- "Thubway Tham’s Wonderful Day", Detective Story Magazine, 1925, short story
- "Thubway Tham and the Con Man", Detective Story Magazine, Feb 13 1926, short story
- "Thubway Tham, Good Thamaritan", Detective Story Magazine, Mar 27 1926, short story
- "Thubway Tham Tunes In", Detective Story Magazine, April 10 1926, short story
- "Thubway Tham’s Red Wallet", Detective Story Magazine, Apr 17 1926, short story
- "Thubway Tham’s Skyrocket", Detective Story Magazine, Jul 3 1926, short story
- "Thubway Tham’s Monkey Pal", Detective Story Magazine, Aug 7 1926, short story
- "Thubway Tham’s Pupil", Detective Story Magazine, Oct 9 1926, short story
- "Thubway Tham’s Chrithmath Tree", Detective Story Magazine, Dec 25 1926, short story
- "Thubway Tham Steals a Base", Detective Story Magazine, Oct 8 1927, short story
- "Thubway Tham and the Rube", Detective Story Magazine, Nov 12 1927, short story
- "Thubway Tham’s Puzzling Leather", Detective Story Magazine, Nov 26 1927, short story
- "Thubway Tham, Patriot", Detective Story Magazine, Feb 25 1928, short story
- "Thubway Tham’s Ides of March", Detective Story Magazine, Mar 24 1928, short story
- "Thubway Tham Shakes a Star", Detective Story Magazine, Mar 31 1928, short story
- "Thubway Tham’s Terror", Detective Story Magazine, May 5 1928, short story, short story
- "Thubway Tham’s Tender Heart", Detective Story Magazine, Jun 23 1928, short story
- "Thubway Tham’s New Thuit", Detective Story Magazine, Jul 28 1928, short story
- "Thubway Tham’s New Thought", Detective Story Magazine, Sep 8 1928, short story
- "Thubway Tham Meets the Crimson Clown", Detective Story Magazine, Nov 24 1928 thru Dec 22 1928, serial
- "Thubway Tham’s Female Petht", Detective Story Magazine, Aug 23 1930, short story
- "Thubway Tham Loveth Dogth", Detective Story Magazine, Sep 27 1930, short story
- "Thubway Tham—Kidnaper", Detective Story Magazine, Nov 22 1930, short story
- "Thubway Tham on the Air", Detective Story Magazine, Dec 6 1930, short story
- "Thubway Tham’s Ignoble Patht", Detective Story Magazine, Dec 13 1930, short story
- "Thubway Tham—Framed", Street & Smith’s Detective Story Magazine, May 9 1931, short story
- "Thubway Tham’s Honethty", Best Detective Magazine, Aug 1932, short story
- "Thubway Tham Back Again", Street & Smith’s Detective Story Magazine. Nov 25 1933, short story
- "Thubway Tham and Nira", Street & Smith’s Detective Story Magazine, Dec 10 1933, short story
- "Thubway Tham Theeth the Fair", Street & Smith’s Detective Story Magazine, Dec 25 1933, short story
- "Thubway Tham—Gangthter", Street & Smith’s Detective Story Magazine, Jan 10 1934, short story
- "Thubway Tham at the Danthe", Street & Smith’s Detective Story Magazine, Jan 25 1934, short story
- "Thubway Tham—Thethpian", Street & Smith’s Detective Story Magazine, Feb 10 1934, short story
- "Thubway Tham’th Glad Ragth", Street & Smith’s Detective Story Magazine, Feb 25 1934, short story
- "Thubway Tham Meets a Racket", Detective Fiction Weekly, May 29 1937, short story
- "Thubway Tham’th Thitdown Thtrike", Detective Fiction Weekly, Sep 11 1937, short story
- "The Return of Thubway Tham", Street & Smith’s Detective Story Magazine, Oct 1937, short story
- "Thubway Tham’s Jewelry Haul", Clues, October 1937, short story
- "Thubway Tham — Model", Clues, November 1937, short story
- "Thubway Tham’s Hot Wallet", Street & Smith’s Detective Story Magazine, Nov 1937, short story
- "Thubway Tham Buys Buttons", Clues, December 1937, short story
- "Thubway Tham—Vox Pop", Street & Smith’s Detective Story Magazine, Dec 1937, short story
- "Thubway Tham’s Old Coin", Street & Smith’s Detective Story Magazine, Jan 1938, short story
- "Thubway Tham’s Own Wallet", Clues, January 1938, short story
- "Thubway Tham Goes Highbrow", Clues, February 1938, short story
- "Thubway Tham to the Rescue", Street & Smith’s Detective Story Magazine, February 1938, short story
- "Thubway Tham, and the Stars", Street & Smith’s Detective Story Magazine, Mar 1938, short story
- "Why Tham Never Reformed", Clues, March 1938, short story
- "Thubway Tham’s Thothial Thecurity", Street & Smith’s Detective Story Magazine May 1938, short story
- "Thubway Tham, Thivilian", Ellery Queen Mystery Magazine, March 1944, short story (Reprinted in Rogues Gallery edited by Ellery Queen (1945 Little Brown, 562 pages))
- "Thubway Tham’s Deed of Mercy", Black Book Detective, September 1948, short story
- "Thubway Tham’s Perfect Day", Black Book Detective, Nov 1948, short story
- "Thubway Tham Begins the Year", Black Book Detective, Jan 1949, short story
- "Thubway Tham’s Quiz Program", Black Book Detective, March 1949, short story
- "Thubway Tham’s Raffle Ticket", Black Book Detective, May 1949, short story
- "Thubway Tham’s Better Thelf", Black Book Detective, Sum 1949, short story
- "Thubway Tham’s Couthin", Black Book Detective, Fall 1949, short story
- "Thubway Tham’s Funny Money", Black Book Detective, Win 1950, short story
- "Thubway Tham’s Veiled Lady", Black Book Detective, Spr 1950, short story
- "Thubway Tham, Eye Witness", Black Book Detective, Sum 1950, short story
- "Thubway Tham Ith Raided", Black Book Detective Fall 1950, short story
- "Thubway Tham’s Crisis", Black Book Detective, Win 1951, short story
- "Thubway Tham’s Nithe Old Lady", Black Book Detective, Win 1952, short story
- "Thubway Tham Returns", The Saint Detective Magazine, January 1959, short story
- "Thubway Tham’s Double Play", Mike Shayne Mystery Magazine, February 1959, short story
- "Thubway Tham’s Bomb Scare", The Saint Detective Magazine, January 1960, short story

=== The Thunderbolt ===
- "Master and Man", Detective Story Magazine, May 4 1920, short story
- "The Kidnapped Midas", Detective Story Magazine, June 29 1920, short story
- "The Big Six", Detective Story Magazine, September 7 1920, short story
- "The Thunderbolt Collects", Detective Story Magazine, December 11 1920, short story
- "The Thunderbolt's Jest", Detective Story Magazine, June 4 1921, short story
- "The Thunderbolt's Engagement", Detective Story Magazine, July 30 1921, short story

=== The Whirlwind ===
- "Alias the Whirlwind", Thrilling Adventures, December 1933, short story
- "The Whirlwind’s Revenge", Thrilling Adventures, February 1934, short story
- "The Whirlwind’s Red Trail", Thrilling Adventures, April 1934, short story
- "The Whirlwind’s Rage", Thrilling Adventures, July 1934, short story
- "The Whirlwind’s Ready Blade", Thrilling Adventures, September 1934, short story
- "The Whirlwind’s Frenzy", Thrilling Adventures, November 1934, short story
- "The Whirlwind's Private War", Thrilling Adventures, January 1935, short story

=== Zorro ===
1. The Curse of Capistrano, All-Story Weekly Vol. 100 No. 2 – Vol. 101 No. 2, August 9 1919 – September 6 1919, serial segment – novella The Curse of Capistrano published by Grosset & Dunlap in 1919
2. The Further Adventures of Zorro, Argosy Vol. 142 No. 4 – Vol. 143 No. 3, May 6 1922 – June 10 1922, serial segment – novella reissued by L. Harper Allen as The Sword of Zorro in 1928
3. Zorro Rides Again, Argosy Vol. 224 No. 3 – Vol. 224 No. 6, October 3 1931 – October 24 1931, serial segment
4. "Zorro Saves A Friend", Argosy Vol. 234 No. 1, November 12 1932
5. "Zorro Hunts A Jackal", Argosy Vol. 237 No. 6, April 22 1933 (a.k.a. Zorro Hunts by Night)
6. "Zorro Deals With Treason", Argosy Vol. 249 No. 2, August 18 1934
7. Mysterious Don Miguel, Argosy Weekly, September 21 1935, serial segment
8. "Zorro Hunts By Night", Cavalier Classics Vol. I No. 2, September 1940 (a.k.a. "Zorro Hunts a Jackal")
9. The Sign of Zorro, Argosy Vol. 305 No. 2 – Vol. 305 No. 6, January 25 1941 – February 22 1941, serial segment
10. "Zorro Draws a Blade", West Magazine Vol. 56 No. 2, July 1944
11. "Zorro Upsets a Plot", West Magazine Vol. 56 No. 3, September 1944
12. "Zorro Strikes Again", West Magazine Vol. 57 No. 1, November 1944
13. "Zorro Saves a Herd", West Magazine Vol. 57 No. 2, January 1945
14. "Zorro Runs the Gauntlet", West Magazine Vol. 57 No. 3, March 1945
15. "Zorro Fights a Duel", West Magazine Vol. 58 No. 1, May 1945
16. "Zorro Opens a Cage", West Magazine Vol. 58 No. 2, July 1945
17. "Zorro Prevents a War", West Magazine Vol. 58 No. 3, September 1945
18. "Zorro Fights a Friend", West Magazine Vol. 59 No. 1, October 1945
19. "Zorro's Hour of Peril", West Magazine Vol. 59 No. 2, November 1945
20. "Zorro Lays a Ghost", West Magazine Vol. 59 No. 3, December. 1945
21. "Zorro Frees Some Slaves", West Magazine Vol. 60 No. 1, January. 1946
22. "Zorro's Double Danger", West Magazine Vol. 60 No. 2, February. 1946
23. "Zorro's Masquerade", West Magazine Vol. 60 No. 3, March 1946
24. "Zorro Stops a Panic", West Magazine Vol. 61 No. 1, April 1946
25. "Zorro's Twin Perils", West Magazine Vol. 61 No. 2, May 1946
26. "Zorro Plucks a Pigeon", West Magazine Vol. 61 No. 3, June 1946
27. "Zorro Rides at Dawn" West Magazine Vol. 62 No. 1, July 1946
28. "Zorro Takes the Bait", West Magazine Vol. 62 No. 2, August. 1946
29. "Zorro Raids a Caravan", West Magazine Vol. 62 No. 3, October. 1946
30. "Zorro's Moment of Fear", West Magazine Vol. 63 No. 3, January. 1947
31. "Zorro Saves His Honour", West Magazine Vol. 64 No. 1, February. 1947
32. "Zorro and the Pirate", West Magazine Vol. 64 No. 2, March 1947
33. "Zorro Beats the Drum", West Magazine Vol. 64 No. 3, April 1947
34. "Zorro's Strange Duel", West Magazine Vol. 65 No. 1, May 1947
35. "A Task for Zorro", West Magazine Vol. 65 No. 2, June 1947
36. "Zorro's Masked Menace", West Magazine Vol. 65 No. 3, July 1947
37. "Zorro Aids an Invalid", West Magazine Vol. 66 No. 1, August. 1947
38. "Zorro Saves an American", West Magazine Vol. 66 No. 2, September. 1947
39. "Zorro Meets a Rogue", West Magazine Vol. 66 No. 3, October. 1947
40. "Zorro Races with Death", West Magazine Vol. 67 No. 1, November. 1947
41. "Zorro Fights for Peace", West Magazine Vol. 67 No. 2, December. 1947
42. "Zorro Starts the New Year", West Magazine Vol. 67 No. 3, January. 1948
43. "Zorro Serenades a Siren", West Magazine Vol. 68 No. 1, February. 1948
44. "Zorro Meets a Wizard", West Magazine Vol. 68 No. 2, March 1948
45. "Zorro Fights with Fire", West Magazine Vol. 68 No. 3, April 1948
46. "Gold for a Tyrant", West Magazine Vol. 69 No. 1, May 1948
47. "The Hide Hunter", West Magazine Vol. 69 No. 2 July 1948
48. "Zorro Shears Some Wolves", West Magazine Vol. 69 No. 3, September. 1948
49. "The Face Behind the Mask", West Magazine Vol. 70 No. 1, November. 1948
50. "Hangnoose Reward", West Magazine Vol. 70 No. 3, March 1949
51. "Zorro's Hostile Friends", West Magazine Vol. 71 No. 1, May 1949
52. "Zorro's Hot Tortillas", West Magazine Vol. 71 No. 2, July 1949
53. "An Ambush for Zorro", West Magazine Vol. 71 No. 3, September. 1949
54. "Zorro Gives Evidence", West Magazine Vol. 72 No. 1, November. 1949
55. "Rancho Marauders", West Magazine Vol. 72 No. 2, January. 1950
56. "Zorro's Stolen Steed" West Magazine Vol. 73 No. 3, March 1950
57. "Zorro Curbs a Riot", West Magazine Vol. 73 No. 3, September. 1950
58. "The Three Stage Peons", West Magazine Vol. 74 No. 1, November. 1950
59. "Zorro Nabs a Cutthroat", West Magazine Vol. 74 No. 2, January. 1951
60. "Zorro Gathers Taxes", West Magazine Vol. 74 No. 3, March 1951
61. "Zorro's Fight for Life", West Magazine, Vol. 74 No. 2, July 1951
62. "Zorro Rides the Trail!", Max Brand’s Western Magazine, May 1954
63. "The Mask of Zorro", Short Stories for Men Vol. 221 No. 2, April 1959

== Other works ==
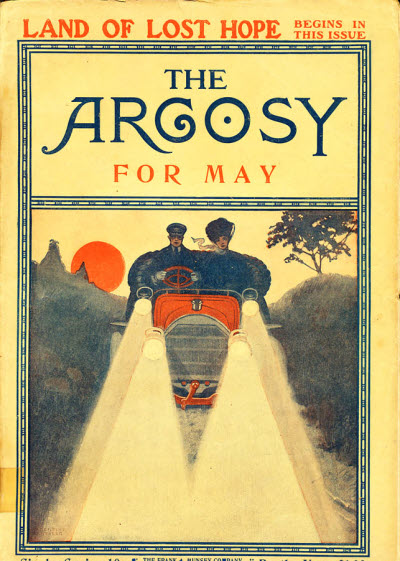
McCulley's "Land of Lost Hope" was cover-featured on the May 1908 issue of The Argosy

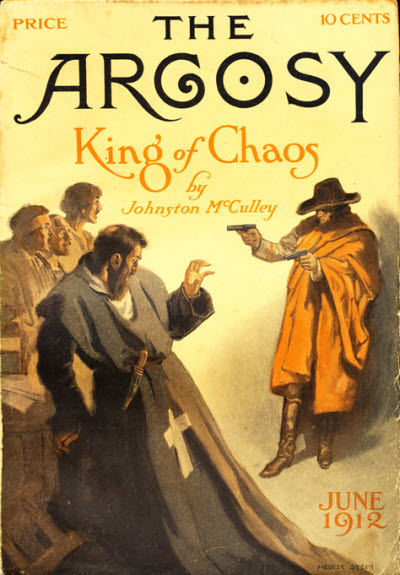
McCulley's "King of Chaos" was the cover story for the June 1912 issue of The Argosy

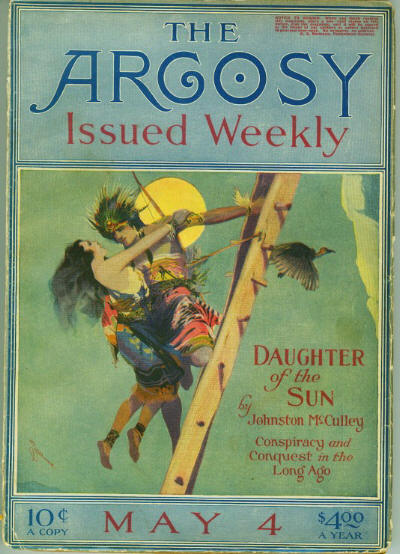
McCulley's "Daughter of the Sun" was serialized in The Argosy in 1918

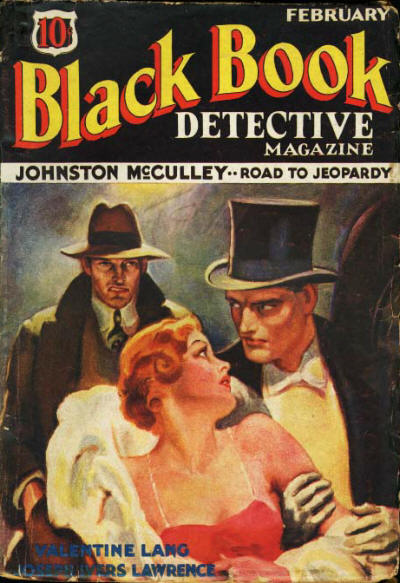
McCulley's "Road to Jeopardy" was the cover story for the February 1934 issue of Black Book Detective.

- Captain Fly-by-Night, All-Story Weekly, May 27 – June 24, 1916 serial segment
- "Advertised in Advanced", West Magazine, April 5 1926, short story
- Alias Madame Madcap, Detective Story Magazine, Sept - Oct 1919 serial segment as by "Harrington Strong", later reprinted in bookform as The Masked Woman
- "Another Man’s Boots", Top-Notch, May 1 1923, short story
- The Answering Flame, Western Story Magazine, October 30 1926, novella
- "Apache Ed", Western Adventures, November 1930, short story
- At Bay on the Limited, Railroad Man’s Magazine, January, February, March, April, May 1909, serial segment
- "At the Pit’s Edge", Western Story Magazine, July 14 1928, short story
- "At Sea in Seattle", Top-Notch, October 1 1915, novelette
- "At the Sign of the Death’s Head", Clues, October, November 1931, serial segment
- "Avengers Three", Western Story Magazine, December 5 1925, novelette
- The Avenging Twins, Hutchinson and Co, 1926, novel, reprints first 3 Avenging Twins stories
- "Baby Beef", Western Story Magazine, July 7 1928, novelette
- "The Backsliding of Maroso", Fighting Romances from the West and East, July 1926, short story
- "Bad Man’s Bluff", Western Story Magazine, September 30 1922, short story
- "The Bar Z Coward", Far West Illustrated, November 1928, short story
- "Beast of Batu", Thrilling Adventures, August 1939, short story
- "Bedded Cattle", Western Story Magazine, August 18 1928, short story
- "Behind Closed Doors", Clues, April #1 1929, short story
- "The Bigwig Bandit", Western Story Magazine, November 24 1928, short story
- "Black Grandee", Argosy Weekly, December 31 1938, January 7, January 14, January 21 1939, serial segment
- "The Black Jarl", Argosy All-Story Weekly, December. 1, December. 8, December.15 1923. serial segment
- "The Blazing Hill", Far West Illustrated, March 1928, novelette
- "Blind Trail", Argosy Weekly, March 5 1932, novelette
- "Blister City Sawbones", Street & Smith’s Western Story, October 1948, short story
- "The Blood Mill", Clues, October #1 1930, short story
- Blood Oasis, Ace-High Magazine, April #1 1931, novel
- "Blurred Heroism", Western Story Magazine, May 13 1922, short story
- "Boomerang!", Ace-High Magazine, March #2 1933, short story
- Border Gunmen, Ace-High Magazine, July #1 1929, novella
- Border Guns, Popular Western, February 1935, novella
- The Brand of Silence (under pseudonym "Harrington Strong"), novel
- "Bricks and Beans", All-Story Weekly, March 24 1917, short story
- The Broken Dollar, Far West Illustrated, January 1927, novella
- "Broom of God", Ace-High Magazine November #1 1931, short story
- "Brother’s Keeper", Exciting Western, April 1945, short story
- Brush Poppers, Thrilling Western, September 1945, novelette
- "The Brute and the Beauty", Far West Stories, March 1929, short story
- The Brute-Breaker, All-Story Weekly, August 10 1918, novelette
- "Buckskin Blights His Boss", Far West Stories, April 1929, short story
- "Buckskin Santa Claus", Texas Rangers, January 1948, short story
- The Bunk House Brute, Western Story Magazine, January 17 1931, novelette
- The Bunk House Pest, Western Story Magazine, January 7 1928, novella
- "Burning Feet", Western Story Magazine, March 3 1928, short story
- "Bush Pilot’s Happy New Year", Sky Fighters, Win 1949, short story
- "Butts First", Western Story Magazine, February 26 1921, short story
- The Cactus Fool (with William D. Hoffman), Western Story Magazine, December 18 1920, novelette
- "Calf Love", Thrilling Ranch Stories, October 1945, short story
- The Call to Peace, Top-Notch, September 10 1914, novella
- Canyon of the Lost, Thrilling Adventures, November 1933, novelette
- "The Capture of Bad Man Simms", The All-Story Magazine, November 1907, short story
- "Chaparral Pilot", The Rio Kid Western, June 1948, short story
- "Chaps Make the Chap", Western Story Magazine, January 19 1929, short story
- "Christmas at Broken Wheel", Thrilling Western, January 1947, short story
- "Christmas Climax", Triple Western, February 1949, short story
- "Christmas Eve Detail", Detective Novel Magazine, January 1948, short story
- "A Christmas Go-Between", Western Story Magazine, December 25 1920, short story
- "Christmas Tree Detail", Giant Western, February 1949, short story
- "Citizen Scout", Big Chief Western, February 1941, short story
- "The Clean Gun", Clues June #2 1929, short story
- Code of the Woods, Western Story Magazine, March 19, March 26, April 2, April 9 1921, serial segment
- The Colt Cavalier, The Golden West Magazine, April 1937, novella
- "Common Kid Gloves", Argosy All-Story Weekly, October 7 1922, short story
- Cowboy Avengement, Western Story Magazine, August 6 1921, novelette
- "Crimson Hands", Clues October #1 1929, short story
- Crimson Sieta, Thrilling Western, January 1948, novelette
- Daughter of the Sun, The Argosy May 4 1918, serial segment
- "Death De Luxe", Clues December 1931, short story
- "Death Ends the Year", Black Book Detective, February 1948, short story
- "Death Plays Santa Claus", Popular Detective, December 1945, short story
- "Death Rides the Night Stage", Clues February #2 1930, short story
- "Death Starts the New Year", Thrilling Detective, February 1947, short story
- "Death’s Curtain Call", Black Book Detective Magazine, March 1934, short story
- "Demons of Disaster", The Masked Rider Western Magazine, March 1946, short story
- Dented in Denver, Top-Notch, November 20 1914, novella
- The Devil's Doubloons, Argosy Weekly, March 16, March 23, March 30, April 6 1940, serial segment
- Devil's Portage, Western Story Magazine, April 24 1926, novella
- "Diamonds and Dough", Clues, September 1931, short story
- Don Peon, Argosy Weekly, August 29 1936, serial segment
- Don Renegade, Argosy Weekly, November 11, November 18, November 25, December 2 1939, serial segment
- Doomed by Post, The Argosy, June 1907, serial segment
- Double Death Takes the Air, Three Star Stories September #1 1929, novella
- The Double Spot, Ace-High Novels Monthly, October 1932, novella
- "Double-Crosser", Smashing Detective Stories, September 1951, short story
- Drawn Fangs, Western Story Magazine, October 8 1927, novella
- Duel in the Arena, Rodeo Romances, April 1947, novella
- "Dugan Gets His Letter", Popular Football, Win 1942, short story
- "Elusive Don Bufon", The Argosy, August 30 1919, short story
- The Emperor's Strategy, Blue Book, November 1911, novella
- "Empty Bunkhouse", Thrilling Western, November 1942, short story
- "Fancy Chaps", Ace-High Magazine December #2 1925, short story
- "Fate Rides the Cyclone", Pursuit Detective Story Magazine, January 1955, short story
- "A Favor for Li Chin", Thrilling Adventures, September 1940, short story
- "Fightin’ Fools", Street & Smith's Western Story, March 1949, short story
- Flaming Hardware, Ace-High Magazine January #2 1931, serial segment
- The Flaming Stallion, Ace-High Magazine January #1, January #2, February #2 1932, serial segment
- The Foaming Barrier, Western Story Magazine, March 20, April 5 1920, serial segment
- Force Inscrutable, Top-Notch, March 1, March 15 1913, serial segment
- Four Men to Get!, Ace-High Magazine November #2, December #1, December #2 1932, January #1, January #2 1933, serial segment
- Free Grass Means Gunfighters With Guts!, Western Novel and Short Stories, November 1942, novel
- "Free to Steal", Street & Smith's Detective Story Magazine, May 30 1931, short story
- "Full Reward", Cowboy Stories, September 1926, short story
- "Fumblefist Plays the Game", Exciting Sports, Win 1945, short story
- "The Gentle Stranger", Western Story Magazine, November 25 1920, short story
- The Ghost of Danny Frayne, Exciting Sports, Win 1944, short story
- The Ghost Town, Ace-High Magazine March #1 1926, short story
- The Girl in the Jail, Western Short Stories, June 1955, short story
- The Gleeful Gunman, Detective Fiction Weekly, September 12 1936, short story
- Glorious Enemies, Western Story Magazine, March 10 1923, novelette
- Gopher Doane Pays His Debts, The Rio Kid, Western January 1946, short story
- The Gorgeous Idiot, Western Story Magazine, September 3 1921, novelette
- The Greatest Claim, Ace-High Magazine February #1 1926, short story
- The Green Glove, Blue Book, June 1910, short story
- The Green Sombrero, Western Story Magazine, February 18 1928, novelette
- The Grim Pursuit, Five-Novels Monthly, February 1933, novelette
- The Grin of Death, Ace-High Magazine February #2 1926, short story
- Gun Brothers, Ace-High Magazine April #2 1930, novella
- Gun Debts, Ace-High Magazine December #2 1929, novella
- Gun-Fight Gold, Popular Western, September 1935, novelette
- Gunslingin’ Galligan, Thrilling Adventures, January 1941, short story
- Gunsmoke's Happy New Year, Thrilling Western, February 1948, short story
- Hands Down, Western Story Magazine, June 9 1928, short story
- Hard-up Hayes and His Pearl-handled Gun, Western Story Magazine, November 10 1923, short story
- Hell-Town Roundup, Red Seal Western, August 1935, novella
- Hell's Doorstep, Thrilling Western, September 1934, novelette
- Holsters Tied Down, Western Story Magazine, August 29, September 5, September 12 1925, serial segment
- Hostage of Honor, Big Chief Western, December 1940, short story
- The House of His Friend, Clues July #1 1928, short story
- Hunted Man, Texas Rangers, April 1948, short story
- “Hurricane” Hale, Western Story Magazine, December 17 1921, novelette
- In Her Fathers Boots, Thrilling Ranch Stories, December 1942, short story
- In the Candelaria Reserve (with William D. Hoffman), Western Story Magazine, April 23 1921, short story
- Injun Hate, The Masked Rider Western Magazine, August 1948, novelette
- Is a Bad Man Ever Human?, Fighting Romances from the West and East, May 1926, short story
- It Happened to Hicks, Blue Book, June 1909, short story
- Jazzy James, Clues May #1 1929, short story
- John Standon of Texas, Western Story Magazine, October 7, October 14, October 21, October 28, 1920, serial segment
- The Jungle Trail, All-Story Weekly, February 3 1917, serial segment
- Killer's Canon, The Masked Rider Western Magazine, April 1934, novella
- Killers’ Haven, Western Story Magazine, May 15 1926, short story
- The King of Cactusville, Western Story Magazine, August 4, August 11, August 18, August 25 1923, serial segment
- King of Chaos, The Argosy, June 1912, "complete novel"
- The Lagoon of Monsters, Thrilling Adventures, December 1934, novel
- The Lame Fox, Clues, January 1933, novelette
- Land of Lost Hope, Argosy, May 1908, serial segment
- The Languid Love of Lucien, Breezy Stories, May 1920, short story
- The Last Man, Western Story Magazine, August 4 1928, short story
- The Last Thirty Minutes, All-Story Cavalier Weekly, December 12 1914, novelette
- Learning from Lizzie, The Cavalier, October 5 1912, short story
- The Light that Shone and Disappeared, Railroad Man’s Magazine, May 1908, short story
- Lights of Lucky Loon, The Cavalier, March 21 1914, short story
- Love and Scrappy Scraggs, The All-Story Magazine, October 1907, short story
- Love in Emerald Valley, Thrilling Ranch Stories, August 1944, short story
- Love Mesa, Ranch Romances December #3 1932, novella
- The Love of Liselle, Five-Novels Monthly, January 1929, novelette
- Love Throws a Long Loop, Real Western Romances, March 1951, short story
- Lovers’ Arroyo, Thrilling Ranch Stories, March 1934, short story
- Madcap of the Broke Wheel, Golden West Romances, Fall 1950, short story
- The Man Who Changed Rooms, Clues February #2 1929, short story
- The Man Who Rode Alone, Far West Illustrated, December 1927, novelette
- Marshal of Tadpole Gulch, Range Riders Western, September 1948, short story
- The Masked Trailer, Western Story Magazine, May 21 1927, novelette
- A Matter of Reputation, The All-Story Magazine, March 1909, short story
- Men with Wounds, The Rio Kid Western, Spr 1945, short story
- Merry Christmas, Ranger!, Texas Rangers, December 1945, short story
- Murder Ahead!, Clues March #2 1931, short story
- Murder at the Ringside, Clues, April 1932, short story
- Murder Stalks the Park, Popular Detective, October 1940, novelette
- Murder Trap, Thrilling Detective, October 1934, novella
- Murder Under Guard, Detective Novels Magazine, February 1940, short story
- The Nervous Prince, Argosy Weekly, June 11 1932, novelette
- New Boots, Argosy All-Story Weekly, November 6 1926, short story
- New Year in the Saddle, Rodeo Romances, February 1949, short story
- New Year's at Coyote Creek, Texas Rangers, February 1947, short story
- New Year's at Rock Siding, The Masked Rider Western Magazine, February 1948, short story
- New Year's Deadline, Range Riders Western, January 1947, short story
- New Year's Decision, Exciting Western, January 1949, short story
- New Year's Pardon, Popular Detective, March 1948, short story
- New Year's Stranger, Thrilling Ranch Stories, January 1949, short story
- New Year's Trap, G-Men Detective, February 1946, short story
- The Nighthawk Who Hated Texicans, Western Short Stories, March 1943, short story
- Nita of the Painted Sands, Romantic Range, April 1944, novella
- Noo of the Forest, Street & Smith’s Western Story Magazine, February 1 1936, novella
- Old Sidewinder Plays Samaritan, Western Story Magazine, March 15 1924, short story
- The One-Way Trail, Far West Stories, May, June, July 1929, serial segment
- Outlaw Pals, Ace-High Magazine April #2 1933, novella
- Outlaw's Christmas, Popular Western, December 1948, short story
- Overdue for Death, Ace-High Magazine March #1 1932, novella
- Peanut Pete, Clues, May 1932, short story
- Peanut Pete Leaves a Trail, Clues, June 1932, short story
- Peanut Pete's Change of Diet, Clues, December 1932, short story
- Pennington's Choice, The Cavalier, May 9 1914, novelette
- Pestilence Isle, Thrilling Adventures, July 1942, novelette
- Phantom Portage, Five-Novels Monthly, June 1933, short story
- Pilgrim on the Prod, Exciting Western, March 1950, short story
- Pinch Hitter, Popular Football, Win 1941, short story
- Plotters of Gopher Gulch, Western Story Magazine, November 12 1927, novelette
- Poison for Bad Men, Western Story Magazine, July 31 1926, novella
- Posse for Two, Thrilling Western, January 1945, novelette
- Pounding Hoofs and Hearts, Western Rodeo Romances, Win 1951, short story
- Prairie Sawbones, Range Riders Western, November 1947, short story
- Puma Jake Keeps a Promise, Street & Smith's Western Story, October 4 1941, short story
- Puma Joe Starts a New Year, Popular Western, January 1946, short story
- The Purple Palm, High Spot Magazine, October, November, December 1930, serial segment
- Ragtag Rodeo Queen, Rodeo Romances, Win 1944, novelette
- Rancho Marauders, West, January 1950, short story
- The Range Pest, Far West Illustrated, July 1928, short story
- Rangeland Racketeers, Ace-High Magazine September #1, September #2, October #1, October #2 1931, serial segment
- Ranger Out of Bounds, Texas Rangers, August 1945, serial segment
- Ranger Santa Claus, Texas Rangers, December 1947, short story
- Ranger’s Happy New Year, Texas Rangers, January 1949, short story
- A Reason for Wrath, Cowboy Stories, July 1926, short story
- The Red Finger of Dawn, Western Story Magazine, May 3 1924, novelette
- Red Ranger, Far West Illustrated, May 1927, novella
- Reflected in the Mirage (with William D. Hoffman), Western Story Magazine, April 30 1921, short story
- Refuge That Failed, Ace-High Magazine May #1 1926, short story
- Replacement Rider, Rodeo Romances, October 1948, short story
- “Ride ’Em Cowboy!”, Western Story Magazine, August 2 1924, novelette
- Ride North!, Western Story Magazine, June 16 1928, short story
- Rider from the Pampas, Rodeo Romances, December 1949, short story
- Ridin’ into Trouble, The Rio Kid Western, April 1947, short story
- The Rio Grande Wolf, Ace-High Magazine October #2 1924, short story
- Rodeo Road to Happiness, Rodeo Romances, April 1948, novelette
- Rogue of the Highway, Top-Notch, October 1 1932, serial segment
- Saddle Mates, Western Story Magazine, January 12 1924, novelette
- Saddle Tramp, Thrilling Western, July 1944, short story
- Safety First, Top-Notch, January 15 1915, short story
- “Safety-First” Murder, The Storyteller, May 1937, short story
- Sanded in San Diego, Top-Notch, July 30 1914, novella
- Santa Claus Precinct, Mystery Book Magazine, Win 1950, short story
- Santa in the Saddle, The Masked Rider Western Magazine, December 1948, short story
- Santa Rides a Burro, Texas Rangers, December 1948, short story
- Santa Thumbs a Ride, Popular Detective, January 1948, short story
- Satan’s Caballero, Western Adventures, October 1942, short story
- Satan’s Grubstake, Thrilling Western, March 1948, short story
- The Scarlet Scourge, Chelsea House, 1925, novel
- Scorpion Country, The Rio Kid Western, October 1948, novelette
- The Sealed House, Clues, July, August 1931, serial segment
- Senor Devil-May-Care, Argosy Weekly, September 21, September 28, October 5 1940, serial segment
- Senor Vulture, Argosy Weekly, June 26 1937, serial segment
- Senorita Whirlwind, Thrilling Ranch Stories, April 1946, novelette
- Settled Claims (with William D. Hoffman), Western Story Magazine, December 11 1920, novelette
- Sheriffing for a Season, Street & Smith's Western Story Magazine, January 5 1935, novella
- Shootin’ Fools, Ace-High Magazine February #1 1930, novella
- Shootin’ Mad, Western Story Magazine, January 8 1927, novella
- The Shrouded House Murder, Clues August #1, August #2, September #1, September #2 1930, serial segment
- Singing Steve Comes Home, The Masked Rider Western Magazine, January 1942, serial segment
- Siskiyou, The Cavalier, December 27 1913, novelette
- Six-guns and Soap, Western Story Magazine, August 11 1928, novelette
- Slaves of the Desert Cup, Western Story Magazine, June 14 1924, novelette
- Smoke Against the Sky, Western Story Magazine, January 20 1920, novelette
- Snatch Thief, The Phantom Detective, July 1948, short story
- Sneaky Pete’s Christmas Eve, G-Men Detective, January 1948, short story
- A Snow-bound Yuletide, Western Story Magazine, December 24 1927, short story
- Snowshoe Santa Claus, The Masked Rider Western Magazine, December 1947, short story
- Sod House Santa Claus, Exciting Western, December 1945, short story
- Sons of Satan’s Valley, Thrilling Western, September 1943, novelette
- South of the Pass, Western Story Magazine, May 28, June 4, June 11 1921, serial segment
- The Spark of Manhood, The All-Story Magazine, October 1910, novella
- Stagecoach Yuletide, The Rio Kid Western, February 1948, short story
- The Strong-box Trap, Western Story Magazine, October 14 1922, short story
- Swiftgun Sam, Far West Illustrated, January 1928, short story
- Tainted Caballero, Argosy Weekly, March 5, March 12 1938, serial segment
- Taming an Outlaw, Street & Smith's Western Story Magazine, September 17 1932, short story
- Tapes and Trails, Western Story Magazine, November 29 1930, novelette
- A Texan Rides The Trouble Trail, Thrilling Western, May 1943, novelette
- Through the Mill, Top-Notch, June 1 1911, novelette
- A Tiny Tamer of Men, Western Story Magazine, October 29 1921, short story
- To the Satisfaction of Sheriff Tom (with William D. Hoffman), Western Story Magazine, May 7 1921, short story
- Touchdown in the Fog, Exciting Football, Win 1945, short story
- The Tower of Masks, Five-Novels Monthly, April 1933, novelette
- The Town Tamer, Western Story Magazine, September 15 1928, novella
- Trading Post Christmas, Thrilling Western, December 1948, short story
- The Trail Boss, Thrilling Western, May 1939, novella
- Trail to Heart’s Desire, Thrilling Ranch Stories, Sum 1950, novelette
- The Trail to Revenge, Western Story Magazine, April 28 1928, novella
- Trailed by Two, Thrilling Adventures, August 1938, novelette
- "Tramps’ Christmas Eve", Thrilling Detective, December 1948, short story
- Treasure Trek, Street & Smith’s Western Story Magazine, November 23 1935, novella
- "Trick of the Fox", Short Stories, May 10 1926, short story
- Tricky Hardware, Western Story Magazine, January 12 1929, novella
- "The Trouble Brothers' Quick Deal", High Spot Magazine, August 1930, short story
- The Trouble Dodger, Western Story Magazine, October 27 1928, novella
- The Trouble Man, Western Story Magazine, April 23 1927, novella
- "Tumble-Down’s Top Hand", Street & Smith’s Western Story Magazine, June 18 1937, short story
- Two Softies in Sunland, Western Story Magazine, May 5 1923, novella
- "Two-Gun Trail", Thrilling Western, February 1935, short story
- The Unbranded 30, Western Story Magazine, October 10 1925, novella
- "Under the Rodeo Lash", Rodeo Romances, August 1948, short story
- "Undercover Santa Claus", Exciting Western, January 1948, short story
- Very Bad Bad-Men, Far West Illustrated, June 1928, novelette
- "The Victory of Nokes", Railroad Man’s Magazine, October 1907, short story
- The Village of Wanted Men, Western Story Magazine, August 8 1925, novelette
- Violence Valley, Western Story Magazine, March 10 1928, novella
- The Voice from the Rocks, Far West Stories, February 1929, novelette
- Waste-land Riders, Street & Smith’s Western Story Magazine, April 13 1935, novelette
- "Way Station to Hell", Famous Western, June 1951, short story
- Wench Caravan, Argosy Weekly, December 26 1936, serial segment
- "Whelp of the Fox", Thrilling Western, August 1939, short story
- When the World Stood Still, The All-Story Magazine, August, September, October, November, December 1909, serial segment
- "Where the Trail Forks", Exciting Western, March 1942, short story
- A White Man’s Chance, Railroad Man’s Magazine, June, July, August, September, October 1918, serial segment
- "White Mask and Black Heart", Western Story Magazine, July 28 1928, short story
- Who Dies Next?, Ace-High Magazine, October #3 1931, novella
- "Wild Jim’s Girl", Thrilling Ranch Stories, February 1945, short story
- Wild Norene, All-Story Cavalier Weekly, July 11 1914, novella
- "Wild William Wilts", Western Story Magazine, January 5 1929, short story
- "Wild Wolf of Wyoming", Western Story Magazine, December 15 1928, short story
- With Guns Aflame, Ace-High Magazine June #1 1929, novella
- "Woes Bowl", Exciting Sports, Fall 1942, short story
- "Wolf Claws and Santa Claus", Western Story Magazine, December 22 1928, short story
- Yakima Copeland – Coward, Western Story Magazine, December 6 1924, novelette
- "You’re Dead!", Clues, June 1931, short story
