= BAT =

BAT or B.A.T. may refer to:

== Arts and entertainment ==
- B.A.T. (G.I. Joe), or Battle Android Troopers, fictional robots in the G.I. Joe universe
- B.A.T. (video game) or Bureau of Astral Troubleshooters, 1990
- Big Ass Truck, a US psychedelic funk band

== Business and finance ==
- Basic Attention Token, a cryptocurrency
- Best available technology, a pollutant regulation term
- British American Tobacco, London, England

== Computing ==
- BAT keyboard, a one-handed chording keyboard
- BAT, Block Address Translation registers in PowerPC microprocessors
- .bat, the filename extension used in DOS and Windows batch files

== Medicine ==
- Biogenic amine transporter
- Tropine benzilate
- Blunt abdominal trauma
- Brown adipose tissue
- A brand name of the Botulinum antitoxin serotype A, B, C, D, E, F, G medication
- BAT-2094 [710312-77-9] aka Batifiban, Correctin, Bevifibatide, Beitaning, Betagrin.

== Transportation ==
- Alfa Romeo BAT, concept cars
- BAT Community Connector, a bus system in Bangor, Maine, US
- Batman railway station, Melbourne
- Battle railway station, East Sussex, England (National Rail station code)
- British Aerial Transport, a former aircraft manufacturer
- Brockton Area Transit Authority, an agency in Massachusetts, US
- BaT Tunnel, a cancelled project in Brisbane, Australia
- Bring a Trailer vehicle auction platform

== Weapons ==
- Brilliant Anti-Tank, a guided weapon employed by artillery rockets and bombs
- 120 mm BAT recoilless rifle, a British anti-tank weapon

== Other uses ==
- Bachelor of Applied Technology, a Canadian degree
- Baltic languages, a language family (ISO 639-2/5:bat)
- Baseball Assistance Team
- British Antarctic Territory, Antarctica
- Burst Alert Telescope, aboard the Neil Gehrels Swift Observatory

== See also ==
- Bat (disambiguation)
- Bats (disambiguation)
- BATX, an acronym used to describe the Chinese tech giants of Baidu, Alibaba, Tencent, and Xiaomi
