= Bats (disambiguation) =

Bats are flying mammals.

Bats may also refer to:

== Film and television ==
- Bats (film), a 1999 American horror film
- The Bats (film), a 1999 American animated short film
- "Bats!" (My Little Pony: Friendship Is Magic), episode from My Little Pony: Friendship Is Magic
- "Bats", a Series B episode from the television series QI (2004)

== Music ==
- The Bats (South African band), formed in 1963
- The Bats (New Zealand band), formed in 1982
- The Bats, a short-lived American band formed by Jon Brion in 1982
- The Bats, an early 1980s San Francisco area rock band related to The Sorentinos
- Bats (Irish band), formed in 2007
- "Bats!", a song by The Bronx

== Other uses ==
- Bats people, a small Nakh-speaking community in the country of Georgia
- Bats language, the language spoken by the Bats people
- Bats, Landes, a commune in France
- Louisville Bats, a minor league baseball team

== People with the surname ==
- Joël Bats, a former French goalkeeper and international footballer
- Rob Bats, Dutch politician

== See also ==
- Bat (disambiguation)
- BAT (disambiguation)
- BATS (disambiguation)
