= Bachelor of Engineering =

Type of undergraduate qualification

A Bachelor of Engineering (BEng or BE) or a Bachelor of Science in Engineering (BSE) is an undergraduate academic degree awarded to a college graduate majoring in an engineering discipline at a higher education institution.

In the United Kingdom, a Bachelor of Engineering degree program is accredited by one of the Engineering Council's professional engineering institutions as suitable for registration as an incorporated engineer or chartered engineer with further study to masters level. In Canada, a degree from a Canadian university can be accredited by the Canadian Engineering Accreditation Board (CEAB). Alternatively, it might be accredited directly by another professional engineering institution, such as the US-based Institute of Electrical and Electronics Engineers (IEEE). The Bachelor of Engineering contributes to the route to chartered engineer (UK), registered engineer or licensed professional engineer and has been approved by representatives of the profession. Similarly Bachelor of Engineering (BE) and Bachelor of Technology (B.Tech) in India is accredited by All India Council for Technical Education. Most universities in the United States and Europe award bachelor's degrees in engineering through various names.

A less common and possibly the oldest variety of the degree in the English-speaking world is Baccalaureus in Arte Ingeniaria (B.A.I.), a Latin name meaning Bachelor in the Art of Engineering. Here Baccalaureus in Arte Ingeniaria implies excellence in carrying out the 'art' or 'function' of an engineer. Some South African universities refer to their engineering degrees as B.Ing. (Baccalaureus Ingenieurswese, in Afrikaans).

== Engineering fields ==
A Bachelor of Engineering degree will usually be undertaken in one field of engineering, which is sometimes noted in the degree postnominals, as in B.E., B.AE. (Aero), or B.Eng (Elec). Common fields for the Bachelor of Engineering degree include the following fields:

- Aerospace Engineering
- Agricultural Engineering
- Architectural Engineering
- Automotive Engineering
- Biological Engineering — including Biochemical, Biomedical, Biosystems and Biomolecular
- Chemical Engineering — deals with the process of converting raw materials or chemicals into more useful or valuable forms
- Civil Engineering — a wide-ranging field, including building engineering, civil engineering, construction engineering, industrial, manufacturing, mechanical, materials and control engineering
- Clean Technology — use energy, water and raw materials and other inputs more efficiently and productively. Create less waste or toxicity and deliver equal or superior performance.
- Computer Engineering
- Computer Science and Engineering
- Control Engineering — a relatively new and more specialized subfield of Electrical Engineering that focuses on integrating Electrical Controls and their programming.
- Electrical and Computer Engineering/Electronic Engineering — very diverse field, including Computer Engineering, Communication/Communication systems engineering, Information Technology, Electrical Engineering, Electronics Engineering, Microelectronic Engineering, Microelectronics, Nanotechnology, Mechatronics, Software Engineering, Systems, Wireless and Telecommunications, Photovoltaic and Power Engineering
- Engineering Management — the application of engineering principles to the planning and operational management of industrial and manufacturing operations
- Environmental Engineering — includes fields such as Environmental, Geological, Geomatic, Mining, Marine and Ocean Engineering
- Fire Protection Engineering — the application of science and engineering principles to protect people and their environments from the destructive effects of fire and smoke.
- Geological Engineering — a hybrid discipline that comprises elements of civil engineering, mining engineering, petroleum engineering and earth sciences.
- Geomatics Engineering — acquisition, modeling analysis and management of spatial data. Focuses on satellite positioning, remote sensing, land surveying, wireless location and Geographic Information Systems (GIS).
- Geotechnical Engineering — a combination of civil and mining engineering and involves the analysis of earth materials.
- Industrial Engineering — studies facilities planning, plant layout, work measurement, job design, methods engineering, human factors, manufacturing processes, operations management, statistical quality control, systems, psychology and basic operations management
- Information Engineering — same as Information Technology.
- Instrumentation Engineering — a branch of engineering dealing with measurement
- Integrated Engineering — a multi-disciplinary, design-project-based engineering degree program.
- Leather Engineering — an applied chemistry type based on leather and its application.
- Manufacturing Engineering: Includes methods engineering, manufacturing process planning, tool design, metrology, Robotics, Computer integrated manufacturing, operations management and manufacturing management
- Marine Engineering — includes the engineering of boats, ships, oil rigs and any other marine vessel or structure, as well as oceanographic engineering. Specifically, marine engineering is the discipline of applying engineering sciences, including mechanical engineering, electrical engineering, electronic engineering and computer science, to the development, design, operation and maintenance of watercraft propulsion and on-board systems and oceanographic technology. It includes but is not limited to power and propulsion plants, machinery, piping, automation and control systems for marine vehicles of any kind, such as surface ships and submarines.
- Materials Engineering — includes metallurgy, polymer and ceramic engineering
- Mechanical Engineering — includes engineering of total systems where mechanical science principles apply to objects in motion including transportation, energy, buildings, aerospace and machine design. Explores the applications of the theoretical fields of Mechanics, kinematics, thermodynamics, materials science, structural analysis, manufacturing and electricity
- Mechatronics Engineering - includes a combination of mechanical engineering, electrical engineering, telecommunications engineering, control engineering and computer engineering
- Mining Engineering — deals with discovering, extracting, beneficiating, marketing and utilizing mineral deposits.
- Nuclear Engineering — customarily includes nuclear fission, nuclear fusion and related topics such as heat/thermodynamics transport, nuclear fuel or other related technology (e.g., radioactive waste disposal) and the problems of nuclear proliferation. May also include radiation protection, particle detectors and medical physics.
- Petroleum Engineering — a field of engineering concerned with the activities related to exploration and production of hydrocarbons from the Earth's subsurface.
- Plastics Engineering — A vast field which includes plastic processing, mold designing...
- Process Engineering — the understanding and application of the fundamental principles and laws of nature that allow humans to transform raw material and energy into products that are useful to society, at an industrial level.
- Production Engineering — a term used in the UK and Europe similar to Industrial Engineering in North America. It includes the engineering of machines, people, processes and management. Explores the applications of the theoretical field of Mechanics.
- Robotics and Automation Engineering — relates all engineering fields for implementation in robotics and automation
- Software Engineering — systematic application of scientific and technological knowledge, methods and experience to the design, implementation, testing and documentation of software
- Structural Engineering — analyze, design, plan and research structural components, systems and loads, in order to achieve design goals including high-risk structures ensuring the safety and comfort of users or occupants in a wide range of specialties.
- Systems Engineering — focuses on the analysis, design, development and organization of complex systems
- Textile Engineering — based on the conversion of three types of fiber into yarn, then fabric, then textiles

== International variations ==
=== Australia ===
In Australia, the Bachelor of Engineering (BE(Hons) or BEng(Hons) - depending on the institution) is a four-year undergraduate professional degree course with an embedded Honours year, at Level 8 in the Australian Qualifications Framework (AQF). It is described by the Australian Council of Engineering Deans (ACED) as delivering "more advanced, professional and research-based outcomes than any Bachelor Degree." Some institutions in Australia also provide three-year Bachelor of Engineering Technology degrees at Level 7 of the AQF that qualify their graduates to start practice as Engineering Technologists.

The title of “engineer” is not protected in Australia, therefore anyone can claim to be an engineer and practice without the necessary competencies, understanding of standards or in compliance with a code of ethics. The industry has attempted to overcome the lack of title protection through chartership (CPEng), national registration (NER) and various state registration (RPEQ) programs which are usually obtained after a few years of professional practice.

=== Canada ===
In Canada, degrees awarded for undergraduate engineering studies include the Bachelor of Engineering (B.Eng. or B.E., depending on the institution); the Baccalauréat en génie (B.Ing., the French equivalent of a B.Eng.; sometimes referred to as a Baccalauréat en ingénierie); the Bachelor of Applied Science (B.A.Sc.); and the Bachelor of Science in Engineering (B.Sc.Eng.).

The Canadian Engineering Accreditation Board (CEAB), a division of the Engineers Canada, sets out and maintains the standards of accreditation among Canadian undergraduate engineering programs. Graduates of those programs are deemed by the profession to have the required academic qualifications to be licensed as professional engineers in Canada. This practice is intended to maintain standards of education and allow mobility of engineers in different provinces of Canada.

A CEAB-accredited degree is the minimum academic requirement for registration as a professional engineer anywhere in the country and the standard against which all other engineering academic qualifications are measured. Graduation from an accredited program, which normally involves four years of study, is a required first step to becoming a professional engineer. Regulation and accreditation are accomplished through a self-governing body (the name of which varies from province to province), which is given the power by statute to register and discipline engineers, as well as regulate the field of engineering in the individual provinces.

Graduates of non-CEAB-accredited programs must demonstrate that their education is at least equivalent to that of a graduate of a CEAB-accredited program.

=== Nigeria ===
In Nigeria, the Bachelor of Engineering (B.Eng) is a five year undergraduate professional degree course.

In Nigeria, Engineer or Engr is protected: only a certified engineer may use the title.

Certification comes with registration and accreditation by Council for the Regulation of Engineering in Nigeria (COREN). It is the regulatory body that governs the practice of engineering in Nigeria.

The membership is required to practice engineering independently. It is a requirement for some engineering firms and is mandatory for government contracts.

== See also ==
- Bachelor's degree
- Bachelor of Technology
- Bachelor of Applied Technology
- Bachelor of Science
- Bachelor of Applied Science
- Bachelor of Science in Information Technology
- Engineer's degree
- Master's degree
- Master of Engineering
- Master of Science in Engineering
- Master of Science
- Master of Applied Science
- Master of Science in Information Technology
- Institute of Technology
- Vocational university
- Polytechnic (Greece)
- Polytechnic (Portugal)
- Polytechnic (United Kingdom)
