= Bat (disambiguation) =

A bat is a flying mammal of the order Chiroptera.

Bat or The Bat may also refer to:

== Computing ==
- Bat (metasyntactic variable), a placeholder name
- The Bat!, an email client by RitLabs for Microsoft Windows
- .bat, file extension for a batch file

== Film ==
- The Bat (1926 film), a silent film
- The Bat (1959 film)

== Literature ==
- The Bat (play), a 1920 play by Mary Roberts Rinehart and Avery Hopwood
- The Bat (novel), a 1997 detective novel by Jo Nesbø
- The Bat (pulp fiction character), a character in short stories by Johnston McCulley

== Military ==
- McDonnell XP-67 Bat, a U.S. Army Air Forces experimental fighter
- Bat (guided bomb), developed by the U.S. during World War II
- HMS Bat, a Royal Navy destroyer
- USS Bat (1864), a steamer captured by the U.S. during the American Civil War
- Northrop Grumman Bat, an unmanned aerial vehicle developed by Northrop Grumman
- Bat bomb, an experimental World War II weapon developed by the United States
- ASM-N-2 Bat, the first guided munition deployed in WWII by the United States

== Roller coasters ==
- Bat (Lagoon), a roller coaster at Lagoon Amusement Park, Utah, United States
- The Bat (Canada's Wonderland), a roller coaster, Ontario, Canada
- The Bat (Kings Island; opened 1981), a defunct roller coaster at Kings Island, Ohio, United States
- The Bat (Kings Island; opened 1993), previously known as Top Gun and Flight Deck, a roller coaster at Kings Island, Ohio, United States

== Sports ==
- Bat, the club-like implement used to hit the ball in bat-and-ball games
  - Baseball bat
  - Cricket bat
  - Pesäpallo § Bat
  - Softball § Bat
- Bat, an alternative name for a racket
  - Table tennis racket or bat
- Bolo bat

== Other uses ==
- Bat (goddess), in Egyptian mythology
- Bat (heraldry)
- Bat Motor Manufacturing Co., former manufacturer
- One-hitter (smoking) or bat
- Baltic languages's ISO 639-2 code
- Bar and bat mitzvah, a coming of age ceremony in Judaism, with "bat" meaning daughter in Hebrew
- Turkish cold bulgur soup, a soup also known as Bat in the Turkish language
- Bat Masterson (1853–1921), gunfighter, lawman, sports reporter
- Tropine benzilate
- Brown adipose tissue

== See also ==
- BAT (disambiguation)
- Bats (disambiguation)
- Batman, a DC Comics superhero character
- Batman (disambiguation)
- Batt (disambiguation)
- Batu (given name) or Bat, a Mongol-Turkic given name
- La Chauve-Souris (The Bat), a Russian-French touring revue in the early 1900s
- Die Fledermaus (The Bat), an 1874 comic operetta by Johann Strauss II
