= Jim Trainor =

American experimental filmmaker and animator

- Born: James Trainor; 1957 or 1958 (age 67–68)
- Education: Columbia University (BA)
- Occupations: Experimental filmmaker; animator; educator

James Trainor is an American experimental filmmaker and animator. He is known for his 1999 short animated film The Bats, which won an Honorable Mention in the Sundance Film Festival's Short Filmmaking category in 2000. His other films include The Fetishist (1997) and The Moschops (2000).

He is an associate professor at the School of the Art Institute of Chicago (SAIC), where he has taught since 2000.
