= Transogram =

American toy company (1915–1971)

- Founded: 1915; 111 years ago
- Founders: Charles Raizen
- Defunct: 1971; 55 years ago
- Fate: Bankrupt 1971
- Headquarters: New York City, United States
- Key people: Charles Raizen, Roy Raizen, Jerry Tolk
- Products: Toys, board games, jigsaw puzzles

Transogram was an American producer of toys, games and other leisure products from the early 20th century to 1971. It is best known for such long-produced games as Tiddledy Winks and Game of India, as well as such baby-boomer favorites as Green Ghost and television tie-in board games for such characters and series as Atom Ant, The Flintstones, Gomer Pyle, U.S.M.C., Perry Mason and Tom and Jerry.

== History ==
=== Early years ===
Around the turn of the 20th century, Charles Raizen took a summer job with a manufacturer of embroidery patterns. Years later, he found a method of transferring images using friction, and circa 1915, the company became the Friction Transfer Pattern Company, first located on 2nd Street, between Avenues C and D, in Manhattan, then at 113-115 University Place. It quickly found that children enjoyed transferring the friction patterns, and the company shifted toward children's products such as Art-Toy Transfer Pictures. In 1917, Raizen bought the company and renamed it Transogram, but using 1915 as the founding date in its company logo. Moving to 200 Fifth Avenue, the company developed the Toy Research Institute to test toys with input by a child psychologist, leading to the 1920s tagline that its toys were "Kid Tested". The company also began licensing media properties, manufacturing the likes of a Little Orphan Annie set of clothes pins.

After producing toys, play sets and activity items, the company in 1929 produced its first game-like product, Orje, The Mystic Prophet, which one historian calls "a solitaire fortunetelling pastime".

In early 1939, the company announced that its new game Movie Millions would have a marketing push, headed by advertising manager Lee Sheldon, in magazines, trade magazines, newspapers and radio.

=== Later years ===
In 1955, Transogram introduced its first TV-series licensed board game, Dragnet.

In 1960, Transogram was one of seven toy-makers, including Ideal and Parker Brothers, that the Federal Trade Commission accused of violating antitrust law by allegedly soliciting discriminatory advertising allowances from suppliers.

Transogram advertised on television in 1968 for the first time in six years, with a million-dollar campaign centered on Green Ghost and Hocus Pocus, its two glow-in-the-dark games; Ka-Bala, a future-telling game; and the printing kit Inkless Printing. The TV commercials were produced by the advertising agency Smith / Greenland.

=== Going public and final years ===
Following a previous incorporation in New York, the Transogram Company incorporated in Pennsylvania on September 4, 1959. In May 1962, Transogram made an initial public offering of 196,000 shares of common stock from Charles Raizen's private account. It sold for US$10 a share. Raizen retained control with 61.4 percent of outstanding stock.

In 1966, Transogram's total sales were $18,665,631. In the first six months of 1967, the company posted a loss of $1,191,000 on sales of $4,713,000, down from $6,169,000 in sales during the same period the year before. For the first nine months of 1970, Transogram reported a loss of $2,328,000 on sales of $21,642,000, compared to a loss of $293,000 on sales of $17,938,000 during the same period in 1969. Transogram announced in August 1969 that it had agreed to acquire 81% of the stock in Mountain Savings and Loan of Boulder, Colorado, in exchange for an unspecified number of shares of Transogram stock.

The financial holding company Winthrop Lawrence, controlled by du Pont heir Lammot du Pont Copeland Jr. and Thomas A. Sheehan, bought controlling interest in Transogram in 1969 and installed Joseph Bruna as chief executive officer. On February 26, 1971, Transogram declared Chapter 11 bankruptcy, listing liabilities of $12,067,307 and assets of $3,009,072. Trading on the American Stock Exchange had been suspended the week prior.

The Transogram trademark and assets were liquidated in 1971, with the marks and toy molds purchased by Jay Horowitz of American Plastic Equipment. Horowitz later transferred all rights to American Plastic Equipment's subsidiary, American Classic Toys. In 2019, American Classic Toys entered an exclusive license agreement with The Juna Group to represent the Transogram brands in all categories worldwide. In 2023, the Transogram exclusive license agreement was acquired from The Juna Group by CSN Press LLC., publishers of the weekly newspaper, Comic Shop News.

== Products ==
=== Board games ===
- Big Business (1935)
- Game of India (1938) a.k.a. Pa-Chiz-Si: The Game of India
- Wink Tennis
- Tiddledy Winks (1938)
- Ring the Schnozzle
- Movie Millions
- Happy Landing
- Steps 'n' Slides
- Betsy Ross Flag
- Disneyland
- Score a Word
- Screwball: A Mad Mad Game
- Jamoose
- Superman
- Green Ghost (1965)
- Hocus Pocus
- Kabala or Ka-Bala
- Michigan Rummy & Ace-Hi Horse Race (2-in-1)

=== Licensed film & TV board games ===
Source unless otherwise noted:

- Arrest and Trial
- Around the World in 80 Days
- Dragnet
- Hogan's Heroes
- Snagglepuss Fun at the Picnic
- Johnny Ringo
- The Monkees
- Outlaws
- Space Angel Game (1965)
- Overland Trail
- Perry Mason
- Stoney Burke
- Tic-Tac-Dough
- The Virginian
- Wyatt Earp

=== Other ===
- Inkless Printing
- The Little Country Doctor and Nurse Kit.
- New Twists To Cords and Knots (1938)
- Paint by Number Mosaic Art Pictures
- Photomate (1967)
- Pretzel-Jetzel (1965)
- Pyrocon plastic modeling products
- Swing Wing (c. 1965)
- Triple Treat Milk & Juice Bar (1960)

== Subsidiaries and manufacturing plants ==
Source unless otherwise noted:

- Anchor Toy Corporation
- Graphic Products, Inc.
- National Assembly Company
- Playwood Plastics Company
- Toy Research Institute, Inc.
- Toy Scouts of America
- Transco Adult Games
- Transogram Midwest, Inc.

=== Divisions ===
- Tag, Inc., maker of jigsaw puzzles

=== Manufacturing plants ===
- Sturgis, Michigan
- Easton, Pennsylvania
- Sikeston, Missouri
- Canada.

== Personnel ==
Al Capp, prior to his success as the cartoonist creator of the comic strip Li'l Abner, was a graphic designer for Transogram.

By mid-1948, Harold Ross, formerly of Kermin, Thall and Lavelle, had joined as advertising art director. In 1956, Jack Arnold, former advertising manager of Saxon Paper Corp., joined Transogram as advertising manager.

Leroy Fadem became executive vice president and chief financial officer in the late 1950s and served in this position until 1971.

By 1968, Jerry Tolk was executive vice president of Transogram.

== Founder Charles S. Raizen ==
Charles S. Raizen

Company founder Charles S. Raizen (1892-1967) and his wife Patricia Tolk were living in New Rochelle, New York, in 1958 when their son Roy R. Raizen became engaged. A graduate of the Salisbury School in Connecticut and of Lafayette College, and a U.S. Army first lieutenant who had been stationed in Europe, Roy Raizen was a vice president of Transogram at the time. In 1964, he was elevated from executive vice president in charge of operations to president, succeeding his father, who became chairman. The couple additionally had a daughter Edna Mae.

Charles Raizen, who served a stint as president of the Toy Manufacturers of the US, was residing at 309 Beechmont Drive in New Rochelle when he died on May 13, 1967, age 74, at the Plaza Hotel in Manhattan while attending a charity dinner. In 1986, Raizen was posthumously inducted into the Toy Industry Hall of Fame.
