= BATS =

BATS may refer to:

- BATS Global Markets, a stock exchange
- BATS Improv, an improvisational theatre company in San Francisco
- BATS Theatre, a New Zealand theatre venue
- Bermuda Atlantic Time-series Study, oceanographic study in the Atlantic Ocean
- British American Tobacco, by stock symbol on the London Stock Exchange
- Broadly Applicable Tracking System, a tool scientists used to track bats and other animals.

== See also ==
- Bats (disambiguation)
