= Fortune teller machine =

Automaton that prints out reader's fortune

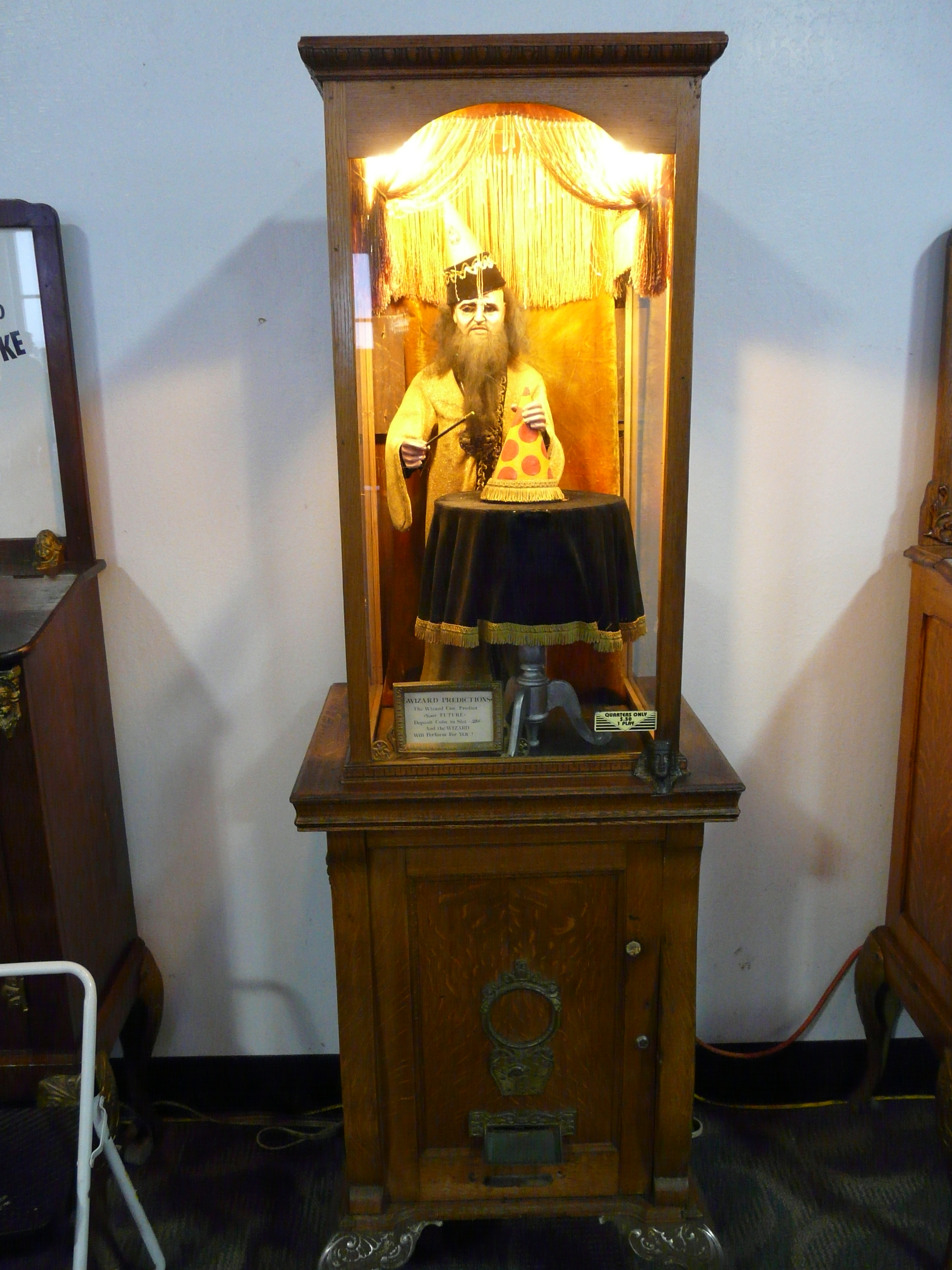
A fortune teller machine at Musée Mécanique

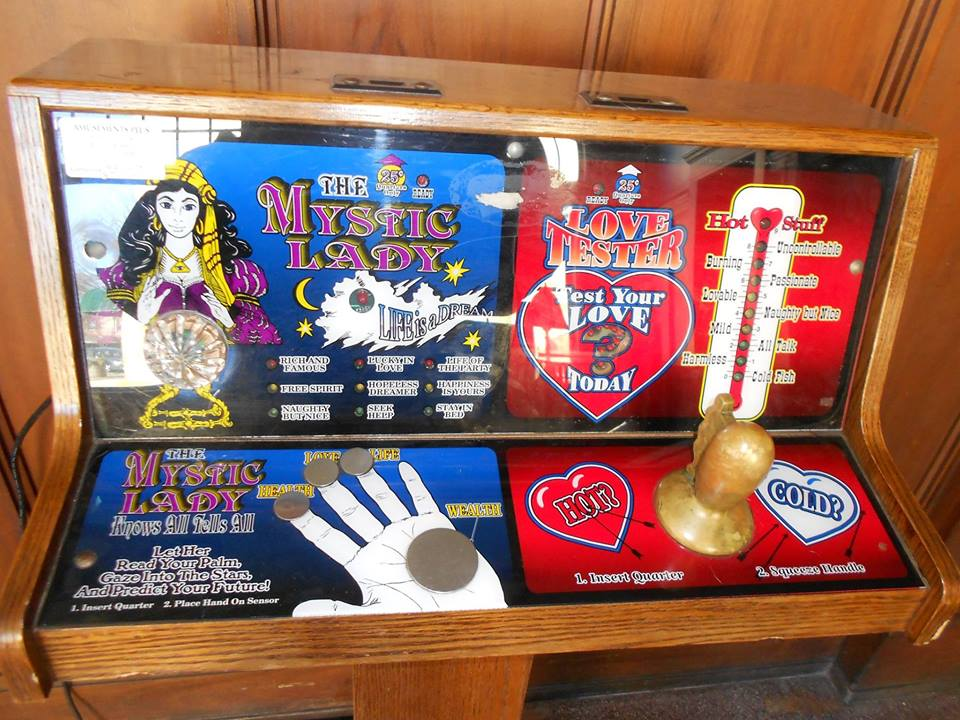
An electronic fortune teller and love tester manufactured in the mid-1990s

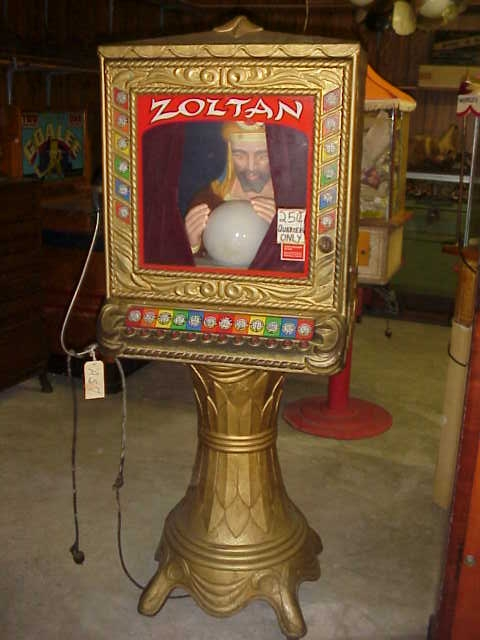
A fortune teller at Gameroom Show

A fortune teller machine (also known as a genie machine or mechanical genie) is a type of amusement automaton, which upon receiving credit gives out a card with a prediction of the reader's future. A machine typically features an automaton themed after Roma or Arabic culture as the supposed source of the fortunes. They could be found in penny arcades, and can be seen in modern video arcades and amusement parks.

== Notable examples ==
- Verbal Fortune Teller - Mills Novelty Co, c. 1904 – One unique machine, perhaps the only extant version in the world, survives in a museum in Virginia City, Montana. It features a recorded voice and eerie animatronics. "The 100-year-old fortune teller was an extremely rare find. Instead of dispensing a card like Zoltar, the Gypsy would actually speak your fortune from a hidden record player. When you dropped a penny in the slot, her eyes would flash, her teeth would chatter and her voice would come floating from a tube extending out of the eight-foot-tall box. This machine also provided fortunes for males and females separately". Reportedly, magician David Copperfield tried to buy the machine from the Montana State Historical Commission for two million dollars.

Fortune Teller Machines are a rare artifact surviving from the era of penny arcade, boardwalk and amusement parks. Listed are a few of the notable varieties:

- Madame Zita - A richly attired fortune teller in Gypsy style. The electric version was manufactured around 1905, by the Roover Brothers.
- Grandmothers Predictions (Cleveland Grandma) - William Gent Mfg, c. 1929 – The wise old grandmother passes her hands over the fortune telling cards and stops at the proper fortune. The card falls into the tray below.
- Princess Doraldina - Doraldina Corp, c. 1928 – Her youth and beauty attract the arcade customer. The machine's lifelike movements when granting fortunes make the process appear to be alive.
- Genco Gypsy Grandma Fortune Teller - Genco Mfg., New York. NY c. 1940s-1950s – The central attraction of the original boardwalk and arcades was the "Gypsy Grandma" that comes to life after depositing a coin into a slot. Once a selection is made using a rotary dial that illuminates the player's astrological sign of choice, the animated Gypsy fortune teller moves her head above a lighted crystal ball while holding a fan of playing cards in her right hand and magic wand in her left hand. Featured sophisticated movements (nods, turns her head, breathes). Her right hand picks-up a fortune card from the enclosure that she opens with her left hand. She brings the card in front of her, turns her head, and then moves the card over the cauldron and drops it (which delivers the card to the patron).
- Mike Munves Grandma's Prophesies Grandma Predicts Fortune Tellers. - Mike Munves Corp., New York, c. 1930s – One hand moves over the cards while the hand moves over the crystal ball, head turns from side to side, eyes move, and the chest "breathes", crystal ball glows as the machine dispenses a fortune card.
- Mike Munves Deco “Ask Grandma” Fortune Teller. - Mike Munves Corp., New York – Ask Grandma Fortune Teller, Deco. Full size Grandma, life size with human movements (chest, both hands, eyes, head). The crystal ball glows once coin is inserted. She will scan the cards for a peek into your future, and then a fortune card will drop for the patron.
- Estrella's Prophecies Fortune Teller – A coin-operated Gypsy-style fortune teller machine. A full size enclosed figure in elaborate oak cabinet. Her head moves from side to side, hand moves across the cards, while her left hand raises and then she slowly dispenses a fortune card through the ornate card slot.
- Zoltan Fortune Teller - Prophetron Inc, Massachusetts, late 1960s to early 1970s – Deposit a 25-cent coin, put receiver in your ear, press one of twelve zodiac sign button on the front of the machine (corresponds to the 12 signs of the zodiac). The crystal ball is lit by an eerie, red mystic light when Zoltan predicts fortune. Offers 1 to 12 Zoltan's fortunes in a heavily Hungarian accent. Zoltan usually begins his fortune telling with "This is Zoltan speaking" or "Greetings from Zoltan". The predictions, which last around one minute, include things about your future, lucky numbers, and favorable colors.

== Gallery ==
Various fortune teller machines at Musée Mécanique in San Francisco:

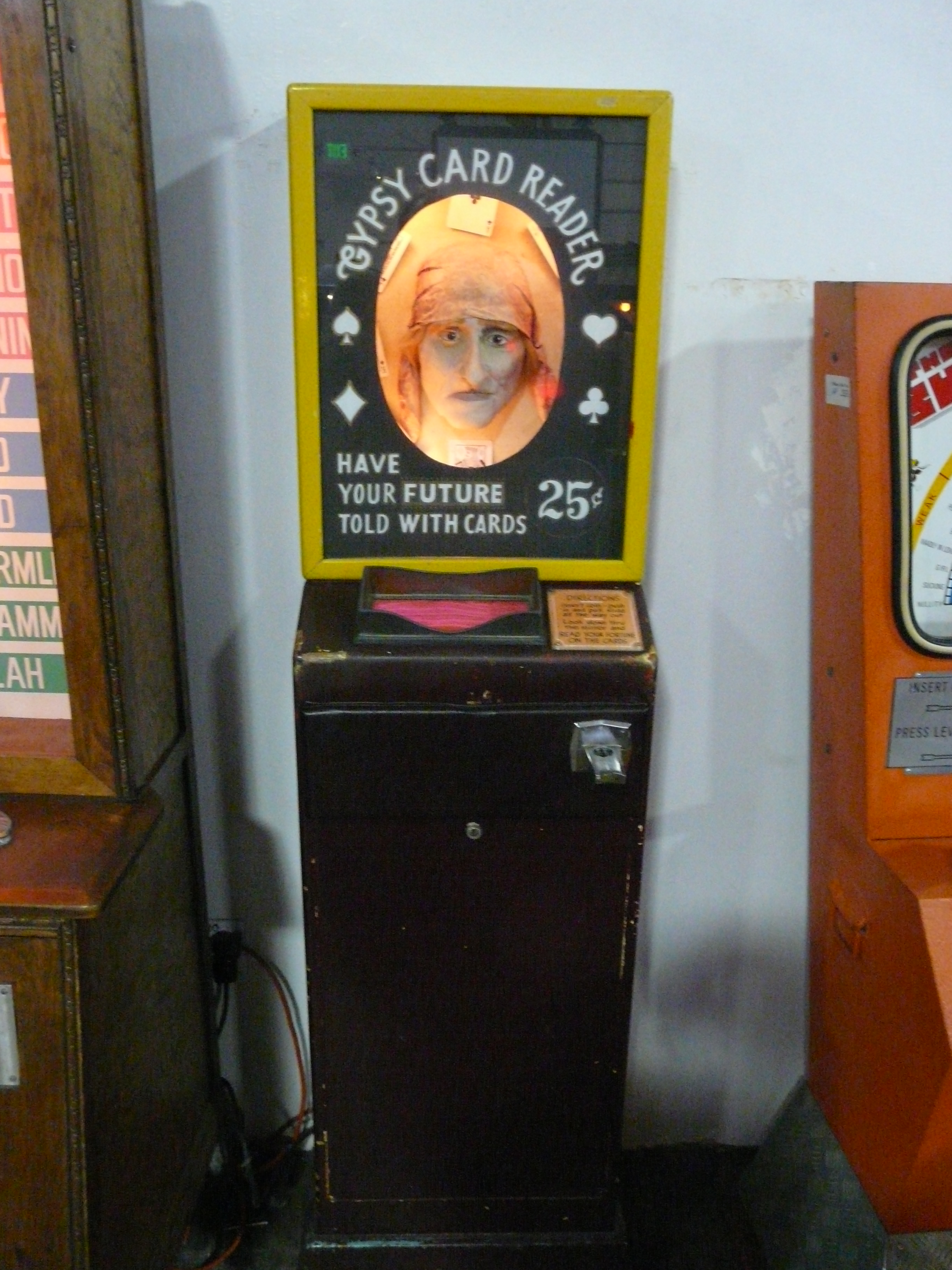

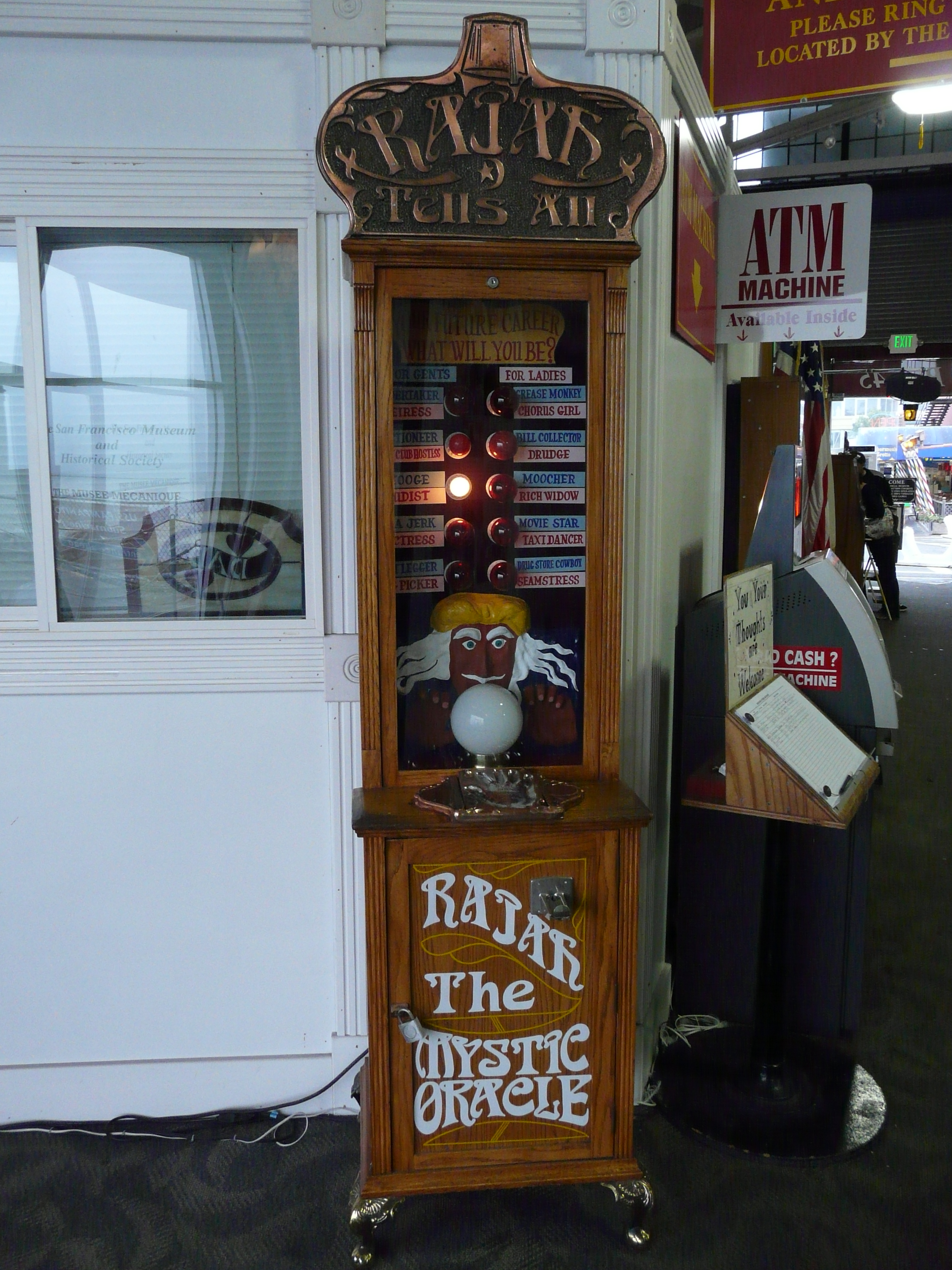

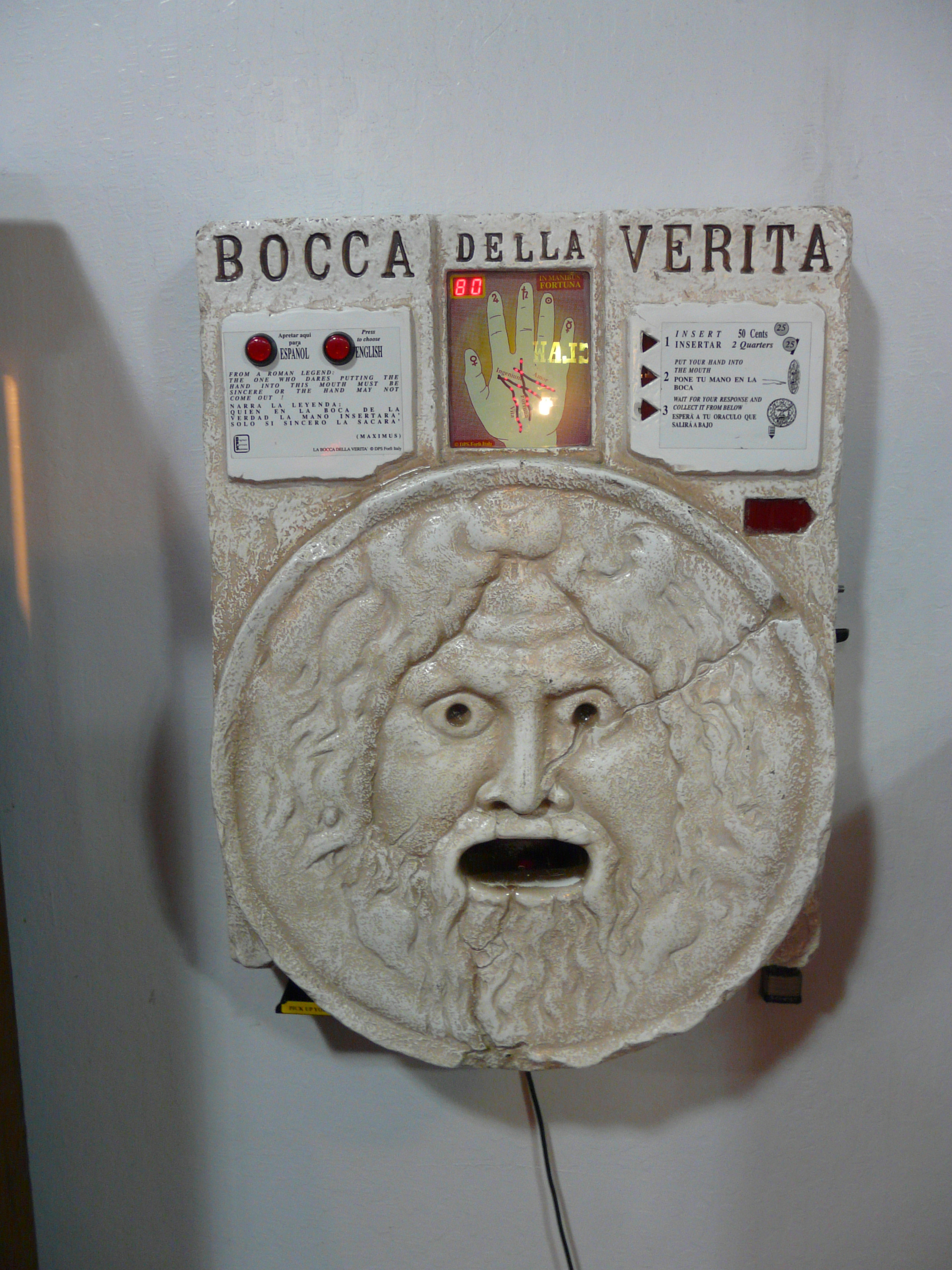

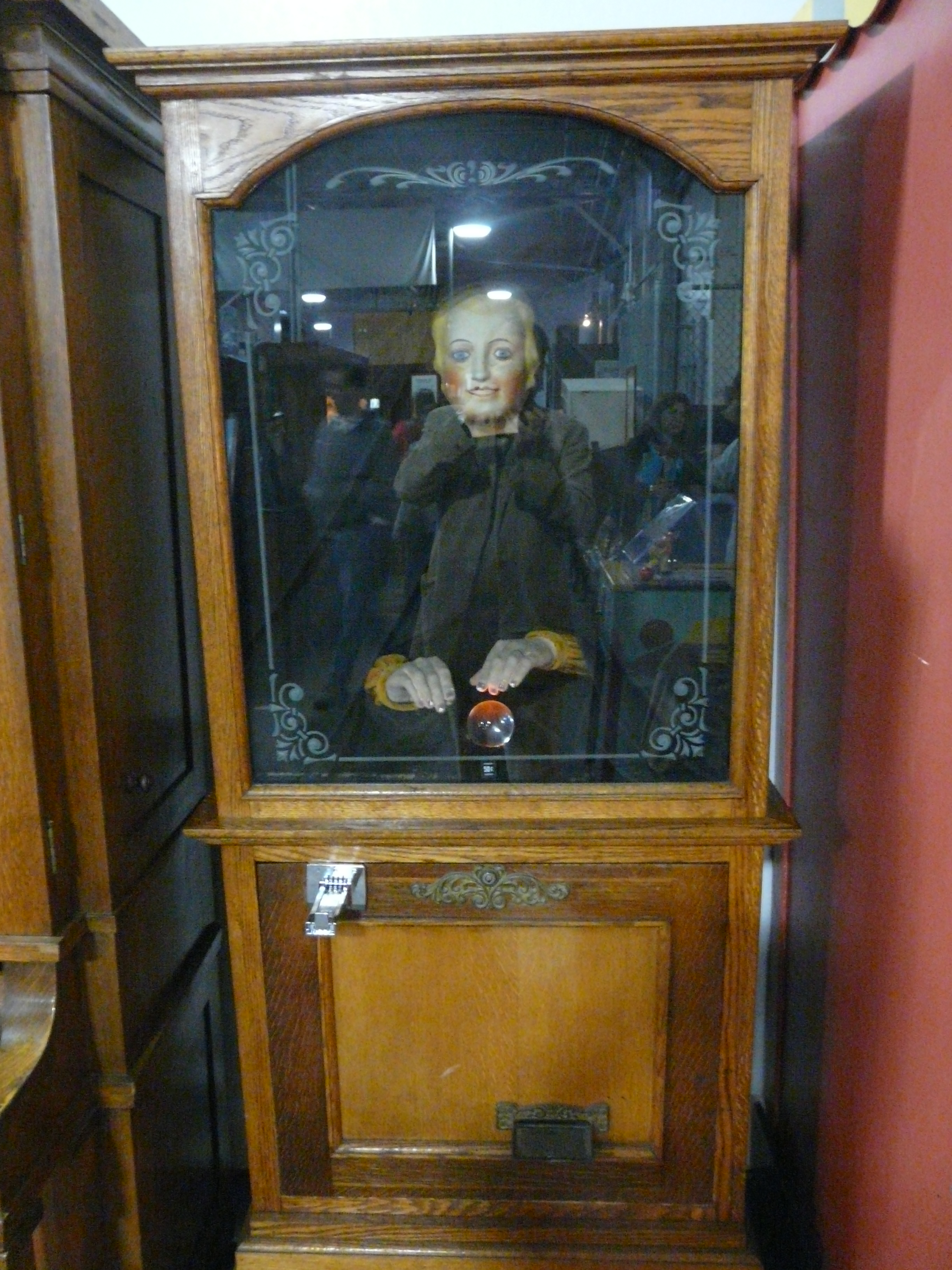

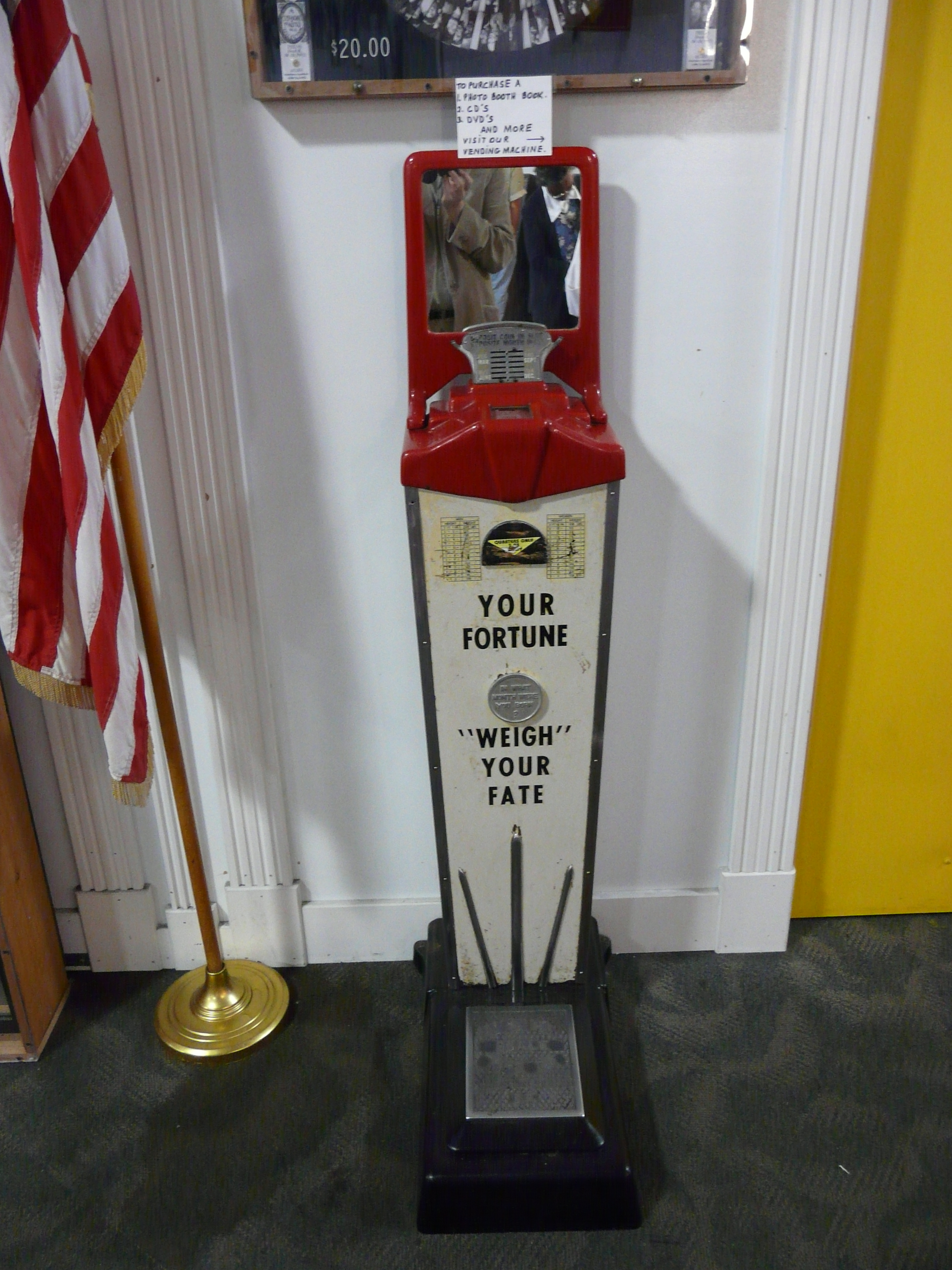

== In media ==
- In episode 43 "Nick of Time" of the American television anthology series The Twilight Zone. It originally aired on November 18, 1960, on CBS and was written by Richard Matheson.
- In the 1988 Penny Marshall film Big, the main character, a child who wishes to be big, uses a "Zoltar" magical wishing machine very similar to a fortune teller machine that turns him into an adult.
- The music video for "Carnival of Rust" (2006) by Poets of the Fall features frontman Marko Saaresto as an aging automaton.
- In the eleventh and final series of Big Brother UK and the Ultimate Big Brother series, a fortune teller machine named Bob Righter (an anagram of Big Brother), was present in the main living area of the house. In the first few weeks of the series, after an eviction, the machine would tell a good or bad fortune to one of the current housemates. However, in a twist it was actually the evicted housemate who decided who would receive the good or bad fortune.
- In BioShock and BioShock 2, fortune teller machines called Epstein the Swami will give out pessimistic fortunes every time they are used.
- In the Canadian stage musical, Ride the Cyclone, the narrator of the show is Karnak, a vintage fortune telling machine who knows the exact time and place of someone's death.
- The puzzle video game Blue Prince features the coin-operated Great Alzara, who gives glimpses of the player-character's future each day he is encountered.

== See also ==
- Ka-Bala
- Fortune-telling
- Amusement arcade
- List of magic museums
- Love tester machine
- Magic 8 Ball
- Strength tester machine
