= Batt =

Batt may refer to:

== People ==
- Batt (surname)
- Batt O'Keeffe (born 1945), Irish politician
- Pseudonym used by the English artist and illustrator, Oswald Barrett (1892–1945)

== Industry ==
- Batt (building insulation), a form of thermal building insulation material
- Batting (material), pieces of fabric or fibre used for stuffing

== Other uses ==
- BATT (professional wrestling) (Bad Ass Translate Trading), a professional wrestling stable
- Batt Reef, a coral reef off Port Douglas, Queensland, Australia
- Harry Batt, an English television programme
- The Batt, the student newspaper of Texas A&M University

== See also ==
- Bat (disambiguation)
- Batts
