= Batts =

Batts is an English surname, derived from a diminutive of Bartholomew. Notable people with the surname include:

- Anthony Batts (born 1960), American police chief
- Deborah Batts (1947–2010), American lawyer and judge
- Elizabeth Batts (1742–1835), British wife of James Cook
- John Batts (1814–1878), American planter and politician
- Lloyd Batts (born 1951), American basketball player
- Matt Batts (1921–2013), American baseball player
- Nathaniel Batts (1620–1679), American trader and explorer
- R. L. Batts (1864–1935), American judge
- Thomas Batts (16th century), English settler and explorer

== See also ==
Stephen Batts (born 1946), hospital and healthcare international adviser.

- Mikey Batts (born 1983), ring name of American wrestler Michael Altieri
- Batts are also a building insulation product. See Building insulation materials#Fiberglass batts and blankets (Glass wool)
- Bat
- Batt (disambiguation)
- Also short for Battery
