= Magic 8 Ball =

Plastic sphere used for fortune-telling

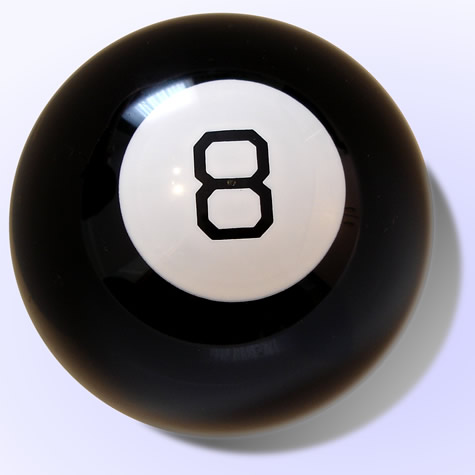
- The Magic 8 Ball
- Type: Novelty toy
- Invented by: Albert C. Carter; Abe Bookman
- Company: Mattel
- Availability: 1950–present
- Materials: Plastic; Alcohol; Blue coloring
- Official website

The Magic 8 Ball is a plastic sphere, made to look like an oversized eight ball, that is used for fortune-telling or seeking advice. It was invented in 1946 by Albert C. Carter and Abe Bookman and is manufactured by Mattel. The user asks a yes–no question to the ball, then turns it over to reveal an answer that floats up into a window. The answers are written on the faces of a floating 20-sided die submerged in dark blue rubbing alcohol.

== History ==
The functional component of the Magic 8 Ball was invented by Albert C. Carter of Cincinnati, who was inspired by a spirit writing device used by his mother, who worked as a clairvoyant. When Carter approached local furniture store owner Max Levinson about stocking the device, Levinson decided to invest in the concept. He invited his brother-in-law and graduate of Ohio Mechanics Institute, Abe Bookman, to collaborate with Carter and further develop the product.

In 1946, Carter filed for a patent for the cylindrical device, assigning it to Bookman, Levinson and another partner in what came to be Alabe Crafts, Inc., combining the founder's names, Albert and Abe. Alabe marketed and sold the cylinder as The Syco-Slate. Carter died sometime before the patent was granted in 1948.

"When he was sober, he was a genius. He stayed in flophouses ... he was always broke."

— Abe Bookman, describing Magic 8 Ball inventor Albert C. Carter

Bookman made improvements to The Syco-Slate, and in 1948 it was encased in an iridescent crystal ball. Though not successful, the revamped product caught the attention of Chicago's Brunswick Billiards, which in 1950 commissioned Alabe Crafts to make a version in the form of a traditional black-and-white 8 ball.

Although originally sold as a paperweight, the Magic 8 Ball remained popular for several decades as both an office toy and a children's toy.

In 1971, Bookman sold Alabe Crafts, Inc., to Ideal Toys, which marketed the ball firmly at children. In 1987, the rights were sold to Tyco Toys, spurring on another marketing campaign and resurgence in interest. In 1997, Tyco Toys was acquired by Mattel, the current manufacturer. Despite its numerous owners, the Magic 8 Ball has changed little in design and implementation. In 2015, approximately one million Magic 8 Balls were sold annually.

== Cultural impact ==
The Magic 8 Ball has become an enduring cultural reference, frequently functioning as an element of chance in a given situation. In the 1995 movie Toy Story, the Magic 8 Ball serves to precipitate the conflict between protagonist Woody and newcomer toy Buzz Lightyear. When Woody asks the ball if their owner, Andy, will take him to Pizza Planet instead of Buzz, it responds "Don't count on it", triggering Woody's fit of anger. Tom Kemper argues that the Magic 8 Ball in this scene helps viewers sympathize with Woody's actions by serving as a concrete representation of the role of chance in his actions.

In 2015, the baseball player Cliff Lee responded to questions from reporters using a Magic 8 Ball in a media session when he was facing difficult questions about the state of the team, telling reporters "it takes a lot of pressure off me".

A mobile app version of the Magic 8 Ball was created by Mattel in 2015.

Several attempts have been made to develop a Magic 8 Ball film or television adaptation. In 2019, Blumhouse had plans for a live-action thriller/horror film directed by Jeff Wadlow. In 2022, Blumhouse announced that it was no longer attached to the project, with reports in 2023 indicating that Jimmy Warden was instead developing a horror-comedy film. In 2025, M. Night Shyamalan and Brad Falchuk announced that they were developing a supernatural mystery/drama Magic 8 Ball TV series.

== Design and usage ==
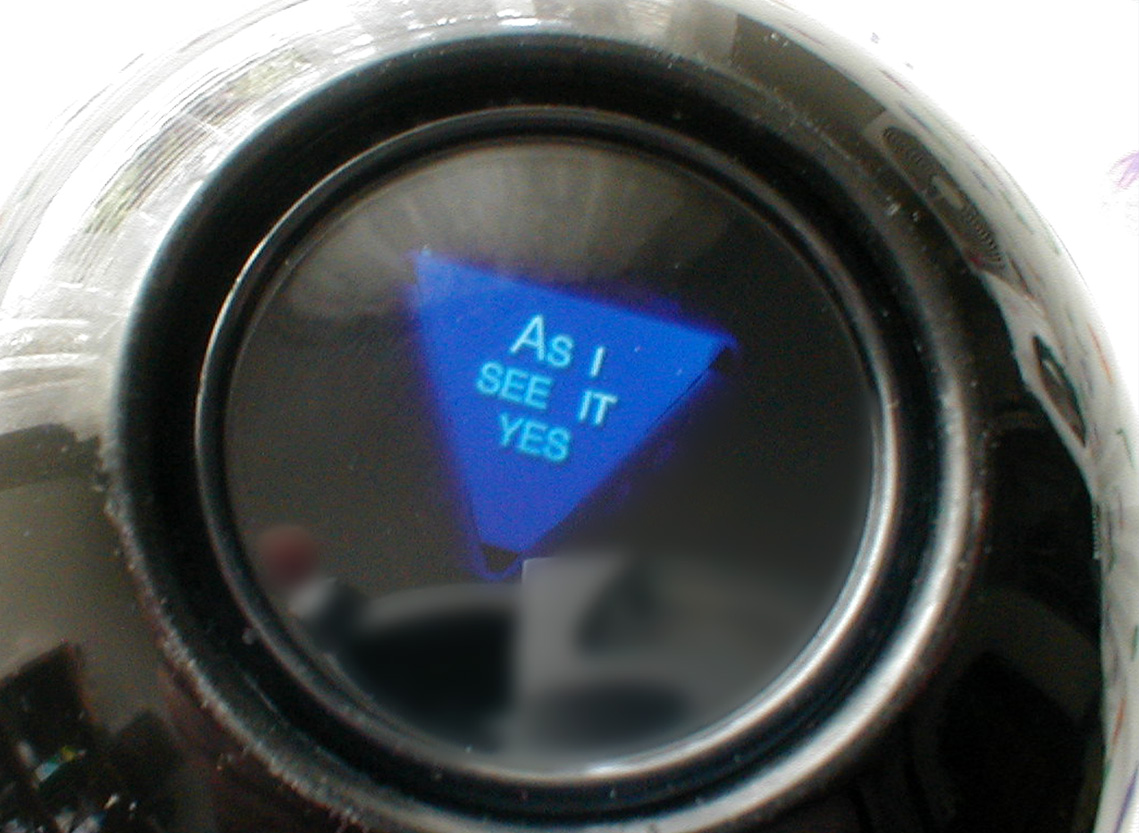
One of the 20 possible responses of the Magic 8 Ball

The Magic 8 Ball is a hollow plastic sphere resembling a black-and-white 8 ball. Its standard size is larger than an ordinary pool ball, but it has been made in different sizes. Inside the ball, a cylindrical reservoir contains a white plastic 20-sided regular icosahedron die, floating in approximately 100 ml (3 1/2 US fl oz) of alcohol dyed dark blue. Each of the die's 20 faces has an affirmative, negative, or non-committal statement printed in raised letters. These messages are read through a window on the ball's bottom.

To use the ball, it must be held with the window initially facing down, to allow the die to float within the cylinder. After asking the ball a yes–no question, the user turns the ball so that the window faces up. The die floats to the top, and one face presses against the window. The raised letters displace the blue liquid to reveal the message as white letters on a blue background. Although most users shake the ball before turning it upright, the original instructions warn against doing so to avoid white bubbles.

While the Magic 8 Ball has undergone very few changes, an addition in 1975 by new owners, Ideal Toy Company, fixed the bubble problem. Its patented "Bubble Free Die Agitator", an inverted funnel, reroutes the air trapped inside. The solution has been used ever since.

=== Possible answers ===
The 20 possible Magic 8 Ball answers were designed by Dr. Lucien Cohen, a psychology professor at the University of Cincinnati. The possible answers consist of 10 affirmative answers, 5 neutral, and 5 negative.

Magic 8 Ball answers
Affirmative		Neutral	Negative
It is certain; It is decidedly so; Without a doubt; Yes definitely; You may rely on it	As I see it, yes; Most likely; Outlook good; Yes; Signs point to yes	Reply hazy, try again; Ask again later; Better not tell you now; Cannot predict now; Concentrate and ask again	Don't count on it; My reply is no; My sources say no; Outlook not so good; Very doubtful

== See also ==
- Divination – Attempt to gain insight into a question or situation through magic or the supernatural
- Flipism – Practice or personal philosophy in which all decisions are made by flipping a coin
- Fortune teller machine – Automaton that prints out reader's fortune
- Ka-Bala – Talking 1967 board game
- Ouija – Flat board for communicating with spirits

== Patents ==
- U.S. patent 2,452,730 – Liquid Filled Dice Agitator; filed 23 September 1944; granted 2 November 1948
- U.S. patent 3,119,621 – Liquid filled die agitator containing a die having raised indicia on the facets thereof; filed 2 January 1962; granted 28 January 1964
- U.S. patent 3,168,315 – Amusement Device; filed 2 January 1962; granted 28 January 1964
- U.S. patent 4,049,277 – Bubble Free Die Agitator; filed 4 September 1975; granted 20 September 1977
