= Swing Wing (toy) =

Toy worn on the head

The Swing Wing is a toy worn on the head and twirled by moving the neck and/or body in a back and forth motion, similar to the Hula Hoop. It was developed by Transogram Games and introduced in 1965.

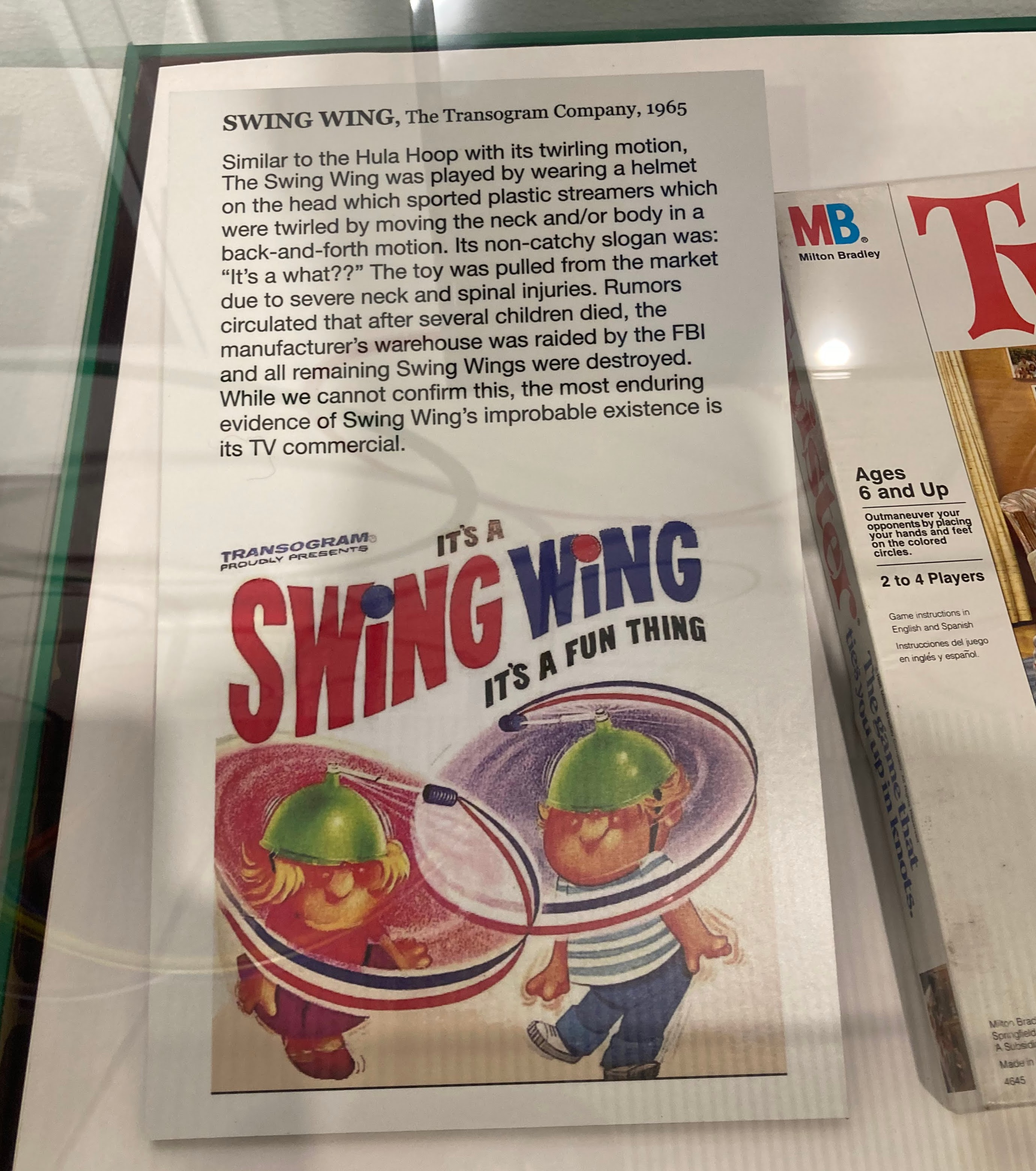
An original 1965 Swing Wing box on display at an exhibit on dangerous toys in 2022 at the Napa Valley Museum.

The toy has received recent notoriety appearing on several television shows, including Fox News Channel's late night show Red Eye with Greg Gutfeld on May 22, 2008, G4's Attack of the Show!, The Ellen DeGeneres Show and the Adult Swim game, Jazzpunk as well as The Gruen Transfer, Good Mythical Morning, and the Roly YouTube channel.
