= Ka-Bala =

Talking 1967 board game

Detail from an advertisement for Ka-Bala in the late 1960s.

Ka-Bala was a talking board game manufactured and released by Transogram in 1967. It was marketed under the slogan, "The Mysterious Game that Tells the Future."

== Design ==
The game board is molded from phosphorescent green plastic which glows in the dark. It sat upon a hemispherical rocker, and was operated by the players touching the "solary projectors", which were handles on opposite sides of the board. In the center of the rocking board, the "Eye of Zohar" was mounted; this plastic eyeball would spin as the board was agitated by the players.

Top view diagram of Ka-Bala board; marble indicator runs in track outboard of the letter/number ring

Unlike most talking boards which are activated by a planchette, Ka-Bala uses a large black marble which ran within a circular track molded into the surface of the game. The marble serves as an indicator for three rings concentric with the track:

1. A printed series with letters, numbers, and yes/no, meant to answer questions asked by the players
2. 22 wells to receive small, rectangular Major Arcana tarot cards included with the game, for fortune-telling
3. The twelve astrological signs, to generate a simple horoscope

Each tarot card has two fortunes printed on the back, one at each short end. These are meant to be shuffled and inserted into the wells face-up with a randomized orientation (upright or reversed); the applicable fortune is read from the card indicated by the marble, on the end closest to the center of the board and hence the fortune depends on the card's orientation.

== Naming ==
The name "Ka-Bala" and the reference to the Zohar indicate that the game was supposedly related to Kabbalah, an esoteric school of thought in Jewish mysticism. As they operated the game, the players were instructed to chant Pax, sax, sarax; hola, noa, nostra!

== See also ==
- Fortune teller machine
- Magic 8 Ball
