= Thubway Tham's Thanksgiving Dinner =

"Thubway Tham's Thanksgiving Dinner" is a short story written by Johnston McCulley. It first appeared in Detective Story Magazine on November 26, 1918.
