= Green Ghost =

Board game

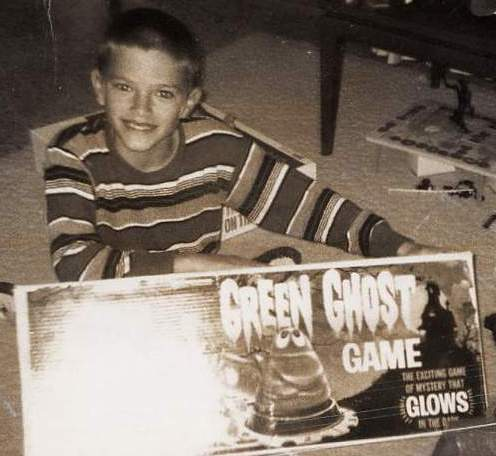
A boy with a Green Ghost game box, 1967.

Green Ghost is a board game for up to 4 players, first published in 1965 by Transogram. Green Ghost is the first board game designed to be played in the dark.

== History ==
Transogram mass-produced the game in 1965, then sold its toy interests to Marx Toys in 1970. In Australia, the game was distributed by the Ideal Toy Company.

In 1997 Marx Toys produced a 30th Anniversary edition of the game (MCMXCVII, Item #3905). This box has "Find Kelly the Ghost... if you DARE" printed on it.

Green Ghost remains collectible, but with so many different editions it is difficult for collectors to know if they have a complete set.

== Features and gameplay ==
Original television commercials for the game encouraged players to play it in the dark. The 1965 box has the printed strapline "THE EXCITING GAME OF MYSTERY THAT GLOWS IN THE DARK."

=== Equipment ===
- Luminous playing board with six legs (detachable)
- Green Ghost with luminous eyes and pointing finger
  - Spinner base
  - Luminous numbers (1–6)
  - Luminous dividers
- Twelve ghost kids (Note: Canonically, the ghost kids are named Olive, Emerald, Lime, Chartreuse, Jade, Bottle, Nile, Mist, Ever, Forest, Bilious (Bill), and KELLY.)
- Four keys
- Four "pets" (player pawns)
  - Bat
  - Cat
  - Rat
  - Vulture
- Three pieces of scenery:
  - Shipwreck
  - Haunted House
  - Gnarled Tree
- Three pits (folding boxes)
  - Three pit covers with luminous keyholes
- Pit texture items:
  - "Bat feathers"
  - Plastic "bones"
  - Rubber "snakes"

The central character in the game was modeled on The Blob and the design was aimed at the campy horror genre of shows like The Addams Family.

Top-down game board schematic

The three-dimensional board features standing scenery and is designed to appear as a spooky town with winding paths surrounding three scenes. The luminous plastic board is elevated on six stilts and underneath are three boxes, covered by locked trapdoors, representing pits which contain either plastic bones, "bat" feathers or rubber snakes, plus a number of hidden "ghost kids" (one of which is "Kelly", the Green Ghost's child). Several paths wind around the three pits, consisting of regular spaces, spaces with pictures of a "pet" (player pawn), and holes to access the pits.

=== Gameplay ===
For the initial setup, four ghost kids are placed in each pit. The other pit items are placed in each pit to provide texture when a player reaches into a pit to retrieve a ghost kid:

- Snakes - shipwreck pit
- Bones - haunted house pit
- Feathers - gnarled tree pit

Each player selects one pawn: vulture, rat, cat, or bat. The keys are mixed up and hidden under the board, and each player draws one key at random. Players use the trapdoor keys to collect ghost kids and increase their chances of winning. For games with fewer than four players, the remaining keys are kept under the board. Each player places their pawn on any regular (non-pawn picture) space. The youngest player starts the game.

On each turn, the player spins the large Green Ghost to determine the number of spaces they can move. Players may move in any direction from the space they currently occupy.

If a player (Player A) lands on a space with a picture of the pawn used by another player (Player B), Players A and B may exchange their keys. Player A also has the option to not exchange keys, but if Player A requests a key exchange, Player B must comply. Because there are four keys and three locked pits, one of the keys is a "misfit" which does not open any pit.

If a player lands on a hole, they "vanish" and "reappear" at the pit corresponding to the key they hold. They must use the key to unlock that pit, reach inside, and retrieve one ghost kid. Immediately after retrieving the ghost kid, they place their pawn on any space with a picture of a pawn, and are then required to exchange keys.

When all twelve ghost kids have been retrieved from the traps, they are placed in little holes on the Green Ghost spinner (players need to remember which ghost kids are found). Then the player who collected the fewest ghost kids spins the large Green Ghost one more time, pointing to the little ghost it identifies as Kelly. Whoever found the one pointed to wins the game.
