= The Bats (film) =

1999 animated short film by Jim Trainor

- Directed by: Jim Trainor
- Written by: Jim Trainor
- Narrated by: Jim Trainor; Marianne McGinnis
- Music by: Joe Miuccio
- Release date: 1999
- Running time: 8 minutes
- Country: United States
- Language: English

The Bats is a 1999 American short animated film written and directed by Jim Trainor, who also narrates the film alongside Marianne McGinnis. Hand-drawn by Trainor with felt-tip pens, the film follows the life of a bat who resides in a cave near a Mayan temple. He is raised by his mother, learns to use echolocation, and embarks on a journey of sexual and metaphysical discovery before ultimately completing his life cycle.

The Bats won an Honorable Mention in the Sundance Film Festival's Short Filmmaking category in 2000.
