= Bring a Trailer =

Automotive website and auction house for classic cars

- Website type: Automotive, auction
- Available in: English
- Owner: Hearst Communications
- Website: bringatrailer.com
- Current status: Online

Bring a Trailer is an automotive website and auction house for classic cars. Hearst acquired the website in 2020.
