= Thubway Tham's Baggage Check =

Short story by Johnston McCulley

"Thubway Tham's Baggage Check" is a short story written by Johnston McCulley. Thubway Tham was the titular character in a successful, long-running series of stories by McCulley. Between 1916 and 1948, McCulley published more than 180 stories featuring Thubway Tham, a small-time crook with a lisp and a heart of gold. In this story, Thubway Tham plots revenge on amateur thieves. It first appeared in Detective Story Magazine on March 25, 1919.
