= Thubway Tham and Elevated Elmer =

Short story

"Thubway Tham and Elevated Elmer" is a short story written by Johnston McCulley. It first appeared in Detective Story Magazine on March 4, 1919.
