= Bachelor of Applied Technology =

A Bachelor of Applied Technology or BAT is a four-year degree granted by Canadian colleges and universities. (This is not to be confused with 2-year associate degree offered by US schools which is equivalent to a diploma program in Canada.) In the United States, The University of North Carolina at Charlotte, Penn State University and others offer similar bachelor's degree in engineering technology that has similar goals. Several United States community colleges and universities, such as Brazosport College in Texas, also offer a BAT with several different concentrations; business management, environment, health and safety, process operations management and general technology management for example. Also in Australia and New Zealand, it is normal for a university to grant a bachelor's degree in engineering technology.

== Entrance requirement ==
The entrance requirement is usually a high school diploma. Graduates of two-year diploma programs (In US, associate degree program graduates) in a closely related field may be admitted directly into the 3rd year of the degree program and can graduate at the end of the fourth year. Sometimes the program consists of last two years only, in which case it is mandatory to have a two-year diploma in a related field.

Some colleges allow students to exit the degree program after successful completion of first two years with diploma credential as well. Graduates of this type of degree program are expected to fulfil a role that is somewhere between a technician and an engineer.

== History ==
Canadian colleges started granting applied degrees in the mid-1990s and all major colleges offer Applied bachelor's degree programs in variety of fields ranging from accounting, human resources, marketing, international business, finance, engineering, criminology, film productions, radio broadcasting and hospitality and tourism management.

== Recognition ==
=== By professional licensing bodies ===
Certified General Accountants Association of Canada accepts Applied bachelor's degree as meeting exit requirements for CGA credential.

Professional engineering associations usually accept membership applications from such graduates, but will sometimes assign supplemental courses before professional designation is given if all other criteria are met.

=== By industry ===
“Society of Petroleum Engineers” accepts a graduate of Bachelor of Applied Petroleum Engineering Technology program as a member.

=== By government ===
Applied degrees are considered a qualified academic credential for the purpose of applying to government-run student loan programs.
