= Legion of Honor (museum) =

Museum in San Francisco, California

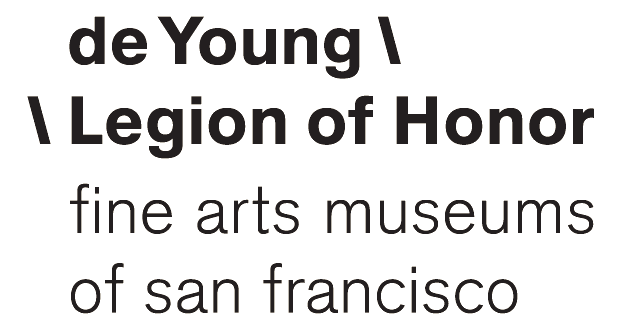

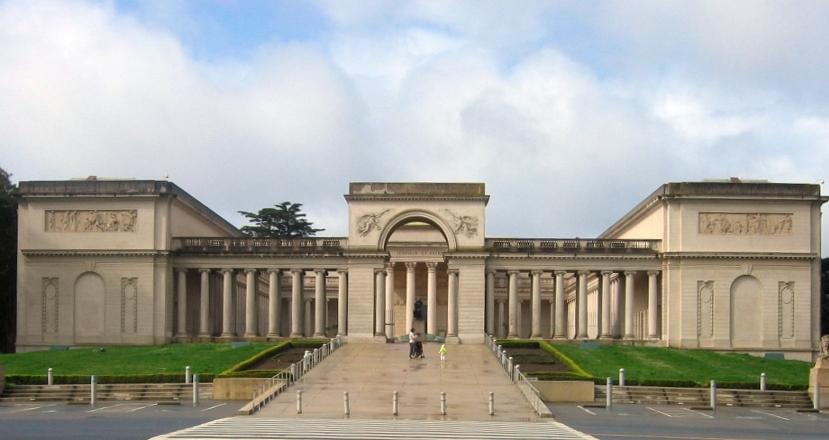
- California Palace of the Legion of Honor
- Interactive fullscreen map
- Established: 1924; 102 years ago
- Location: 100 34th Avenue, San Francisco, California
- Collections: Ancient artifacts; European art, crafts, ceramics, and furnishings; Achenbach Foundation for Graphic Arts
- Architects: George Applegarth and Henri Guillaume (1924), Edward Larrabee Barnes and Mark Cavagnero (1995)
- Public transit access: Muni: 18, 1, 38
- Website: legionofhonor.famsf.org

The Legion of Honor, formally known as the California Palace of the Legion of Honor, is an art museum located in San Francisco, on the West Side of the city. Located in Lincoln Park, the Legion of Honor is a component of the Fine Arts Museums of San Francisco (FAMSF), which also administers the de Young Museum. In 2024, the two combined museums were ranked 15th in The Washington Post list of the best art museums in the U.S.

== History and building ==
The land on which the Legion of Honor stands was once the city-owned Golden Gate Cemetery, established in 1870 and closed in 1909. It held about 29,000 remains and included a Chinese burial ground and a Potter's field.

The Legion of Honor was the gift of Alma de Bretteville Spreckels, wife of the sugar magnate and thoroughbred racehorse owner/breeder Adolph B. Spreckels. After some persuading, Alma convinced Adolph to fund a museum project. To acquire more art and financial support, Alma embarked on a trip to Europe and was successful in requesting donations of fine art from the French government and from Queen Marie of Romania, who donated a replica of her Byzantine Golden Room.

The building is a full-scale replica, by George Applegarth and Henri Guillaume, of the French Pavilion at the 1915 Panama–Pacific International Exposition, which in turn was a three-quarter-scale version of the Palais de la Légion d'Honneur (also known as the Hôtel de Salm) in Paris, by Pierre Rousseau (1782). At the close of the exposition, which was located just a few miles away, the French government granted Spreckels permission to construct a permanent replica of the French Pavilion. World War I delayed the groundbreaking until 1921. Dedicated as a memorial to California soldiers killed in the war, the museum opened on Armistice Day, November 11, 1924.

The museum building occupies an elevated site in Lincoln Park in the northwest of the city, with views over the nearby Golden Gate Bridge and the distant downtown skyline.

Between March 1992 and November 1995 the Legion underwent a major renovation that included seismic strengthening, building systems upgrades, restoration of historic architectural features, and an underground expansion that added 35,000 square feet. The Court of Honor was pierced by a pyramidal skylight opening onto the new gallery space below, a quotation in miniature of the Louvre Pyramid. The architects for the project were Edward Larrabee Barnes and Mark Cavagnero.

The plaza and fountain in front of the Legion of Honor is the western terminus of the Lincoln Highway, the first improved road for automobiles across America. The terminus marker and an interpretive plaque are located in the southwest corner of the plaza and fountain, just to the left of the Palace, next to the bus stop. Dominating the classical plaza is Pax Jerusalemme, a modern sculpture by Mark di Suvero that stirred controversy at its installation in 2000. In 2023, US president Joe Biden held a state dinner at the Legion of Honor for world leaders, including Chinese president Xi Jinping.

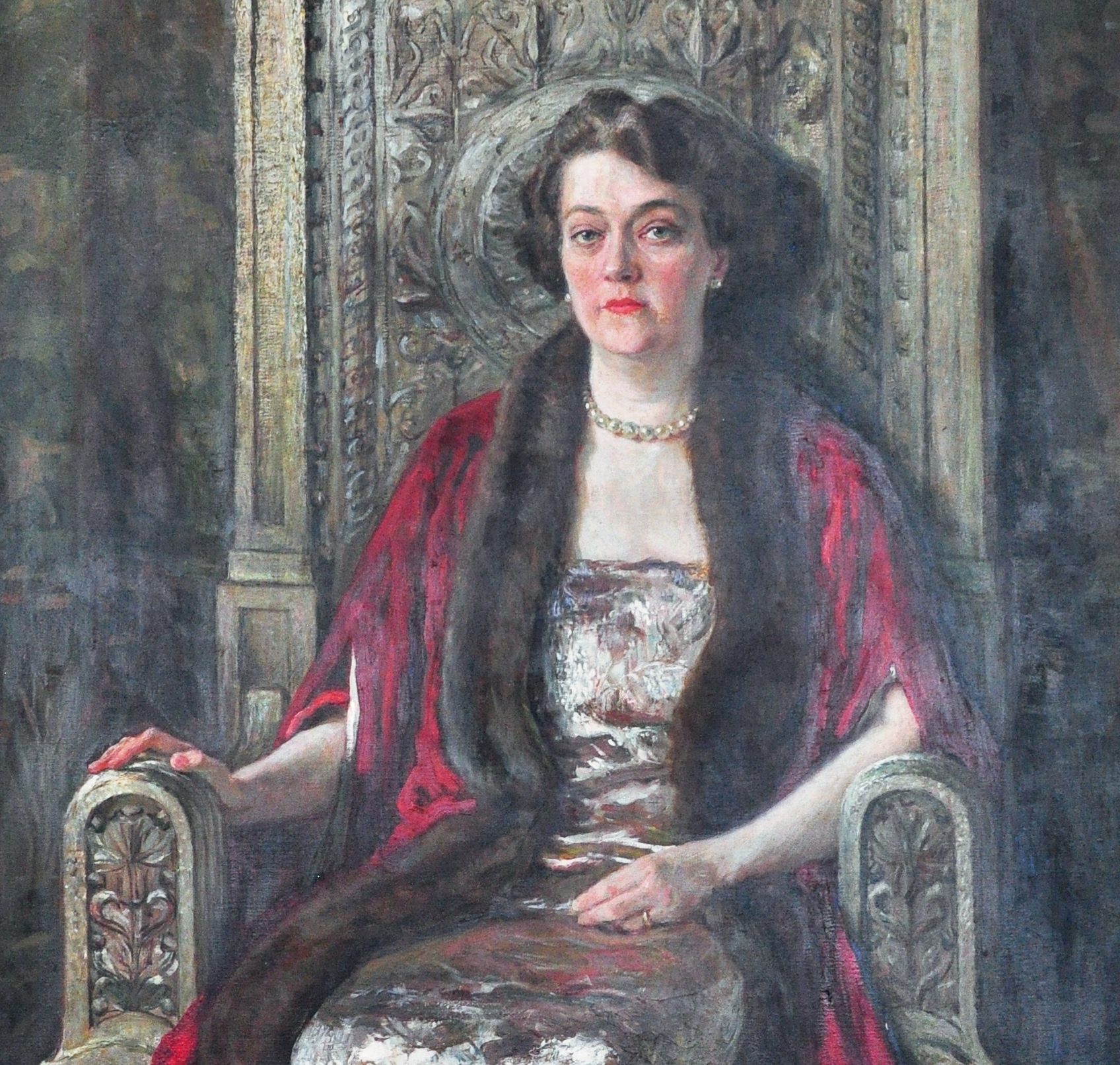
Alma de Bretteville Spreckels and her husband Adolph built the museum and donated it to the city.

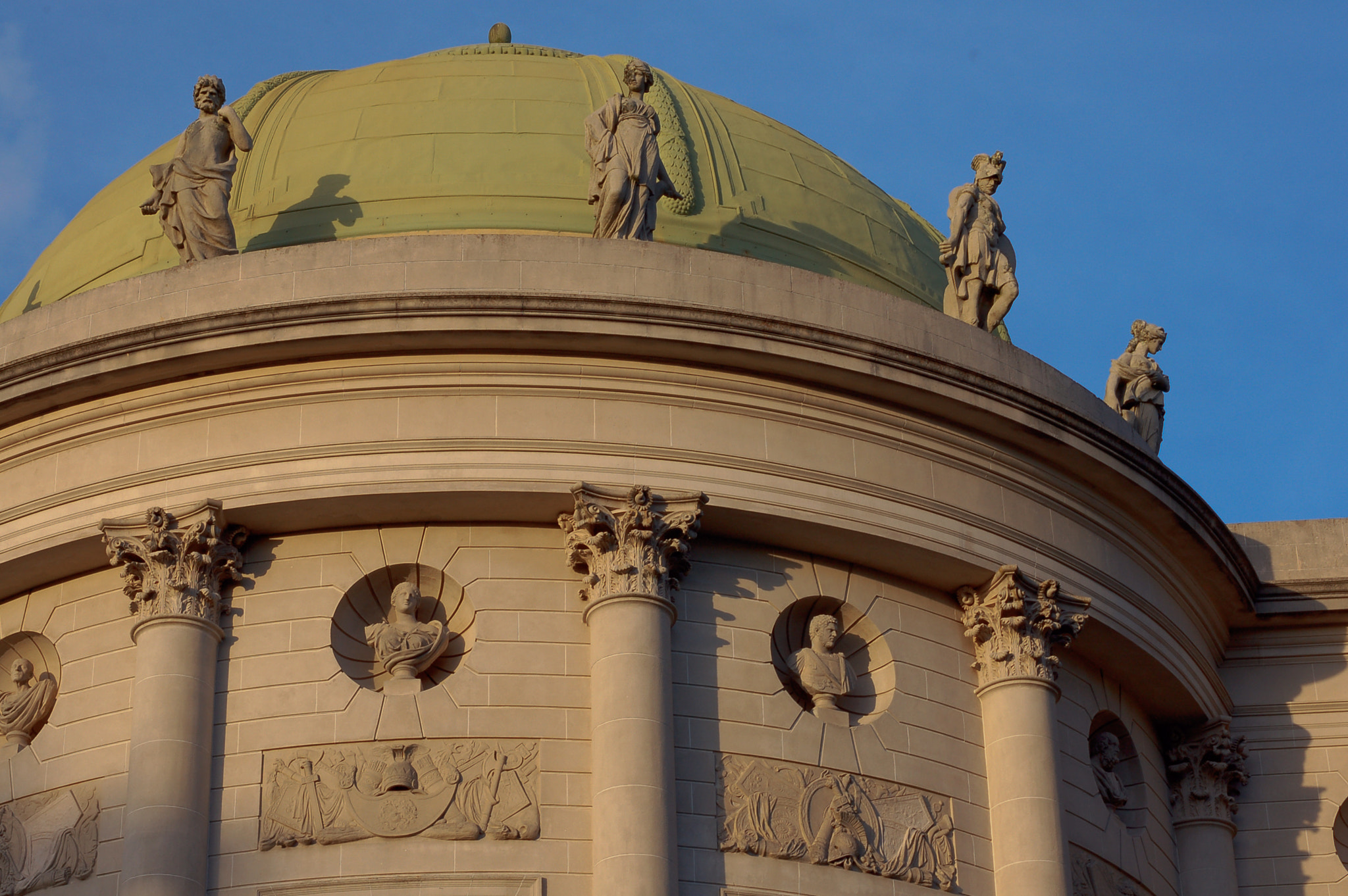
The design of the California Palace of the Legion of Honor was based on the Palais de la Légion d'Honneur.

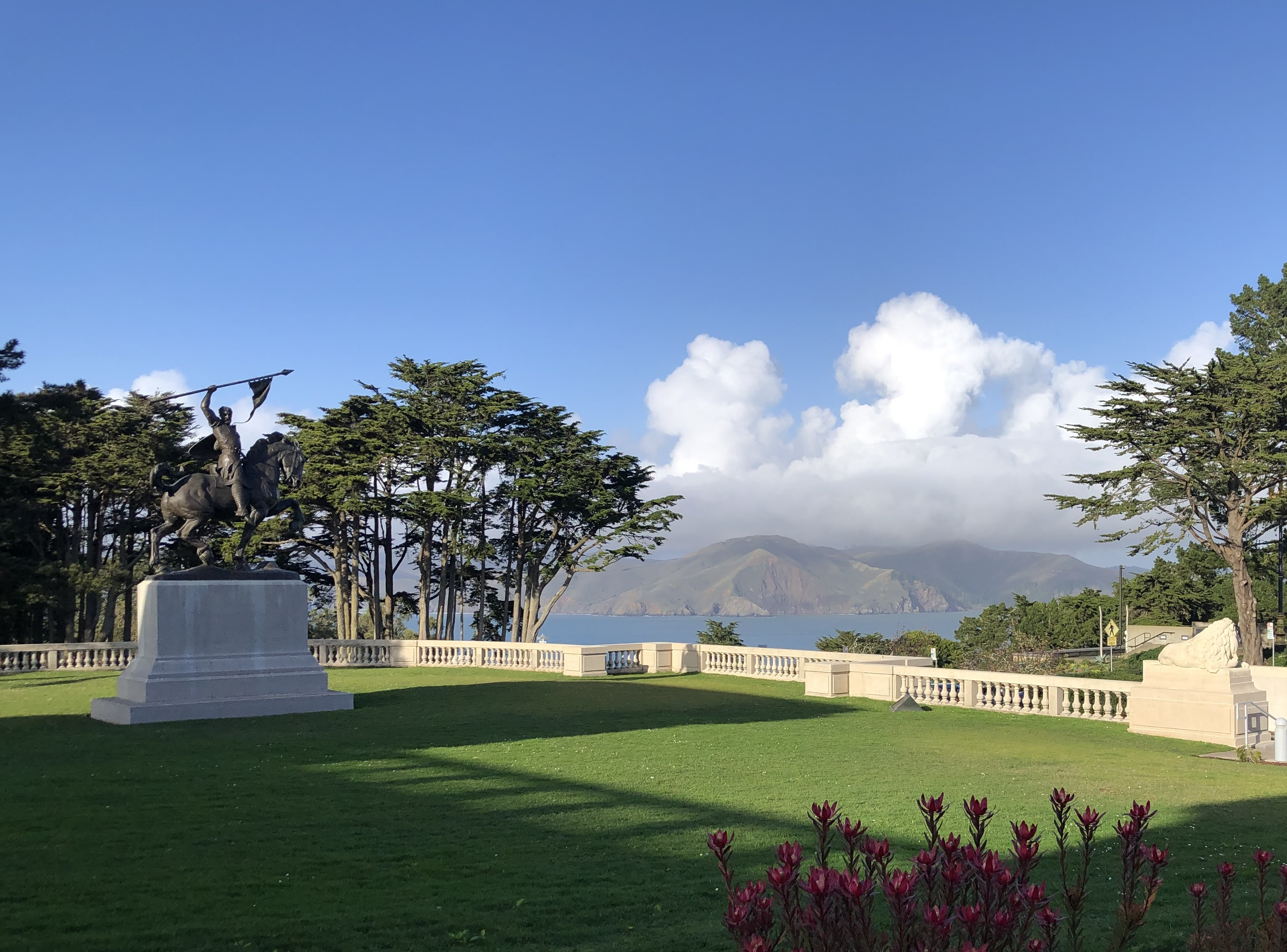
El Cid Campeador by Anna Hyatt Huntington (1927), facing the Golden Gate.

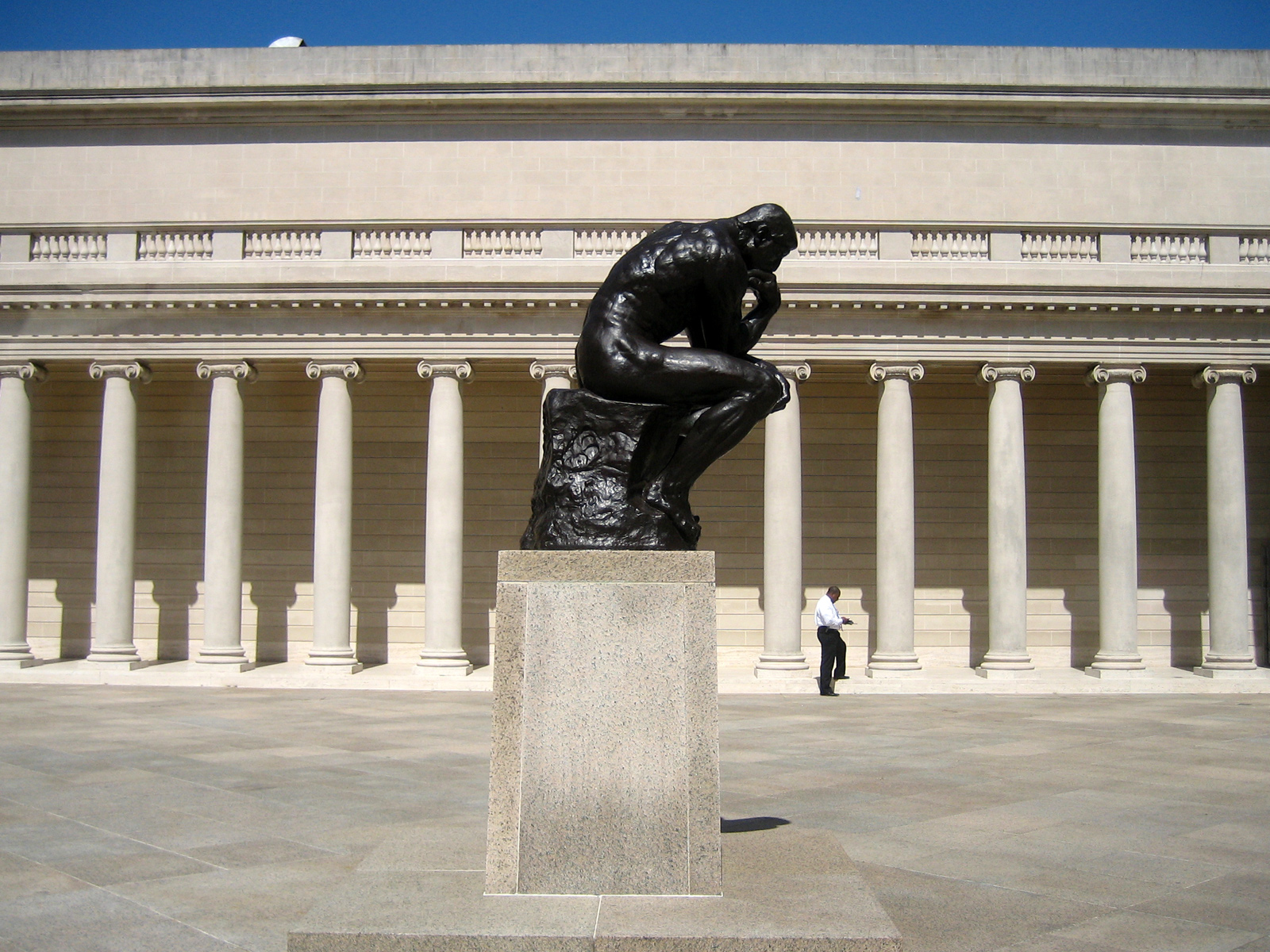
The Thinker by Auguste Rodin (1904) in the inner courtyard.

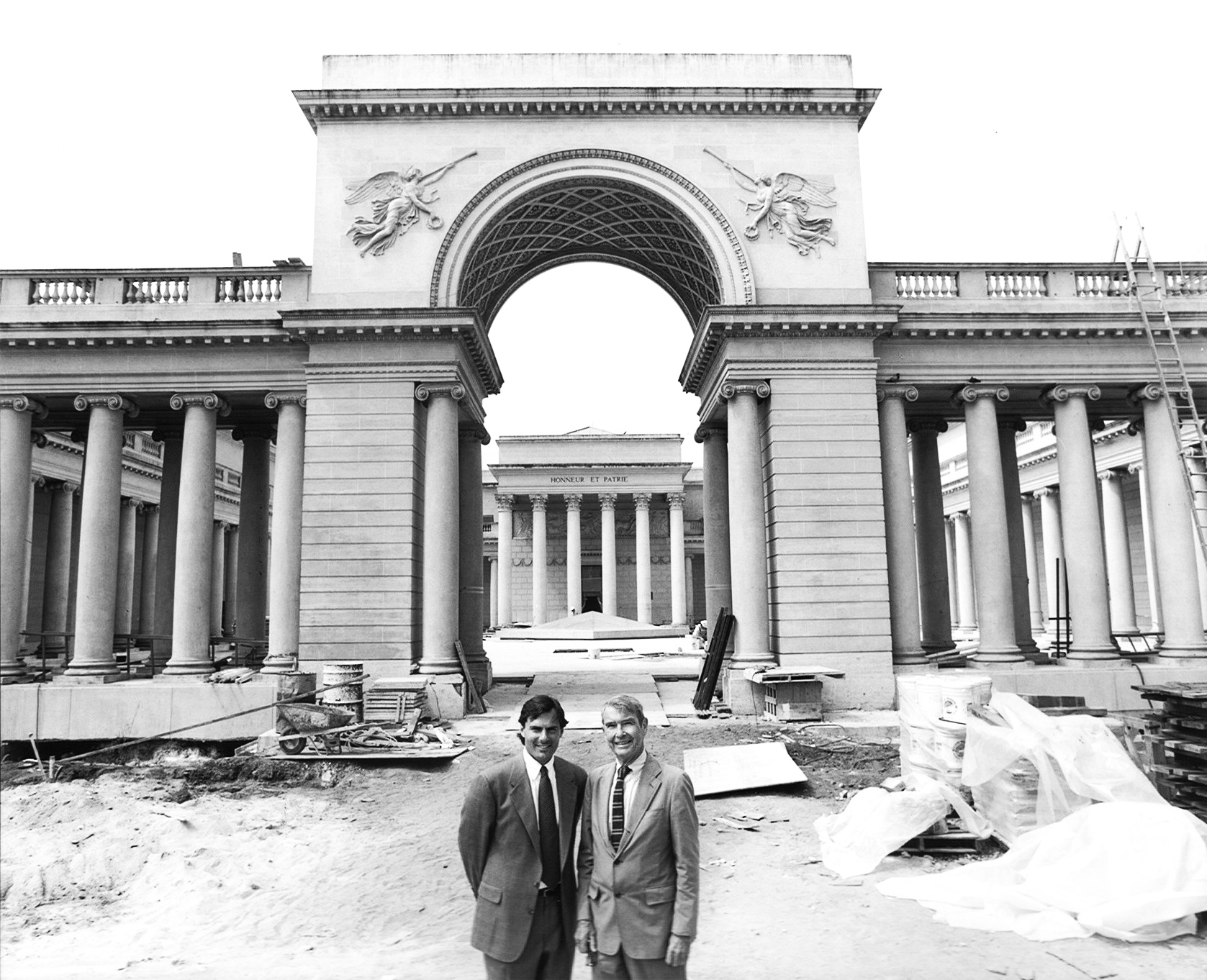
Architects Edward Larrabee Barnes and Mark Cavagnero during the 1995 seismic renovation and expansion.

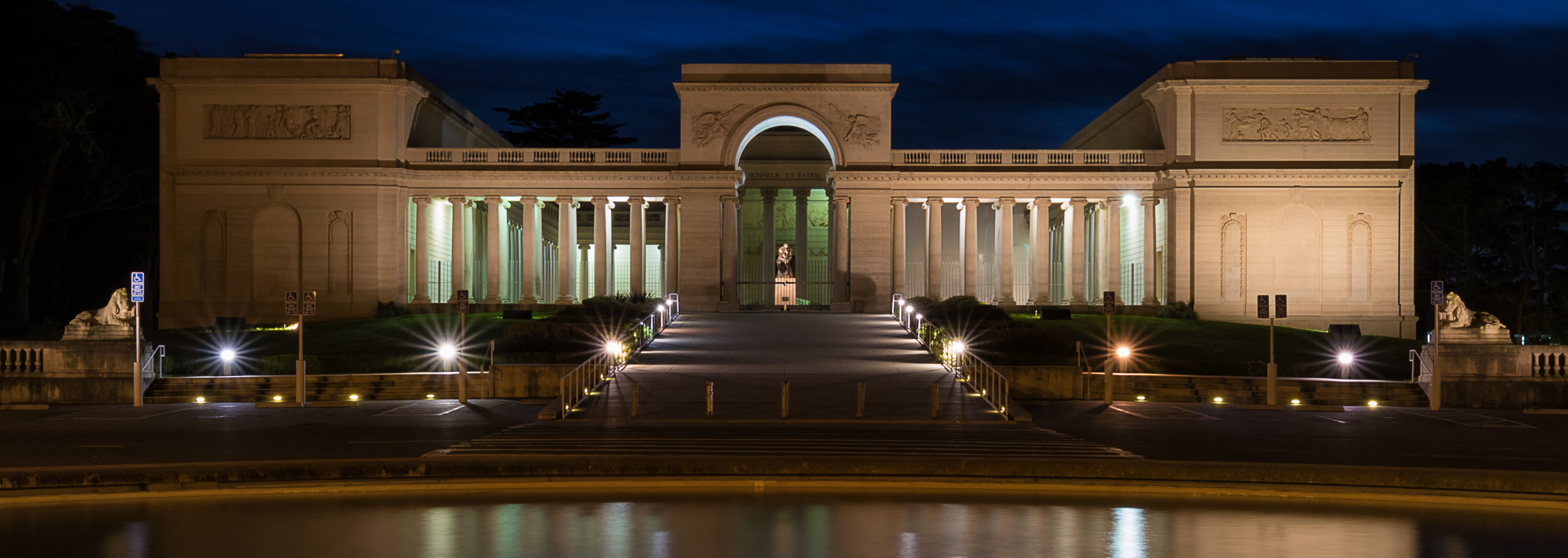
The Legion of Honor at night.

== Collections ==
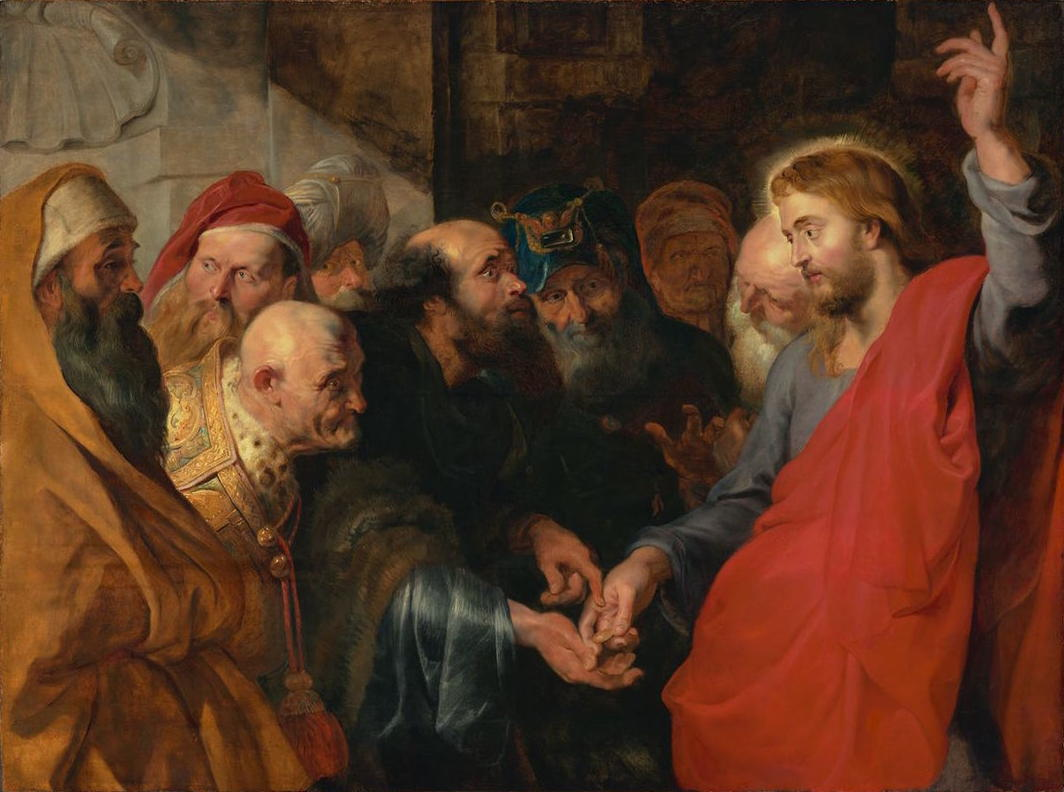
The Tribute Money, Peter Paul Rubens (c. 1610–15).

The Legion of Honor displays a collection spanning more than 6,000 years of ancient and European art and houses the Achenbach Foundation for Graphic Arts.

The Hall of Antiquities displays ancient works from Egypt, the Near East, Greece, and Rome, including sculptures, figurines, vessels, jewelry, and carved reliefs. Notable works include a 4,000-year-old carved wood figure of Seneb, an Egyptian royal scribe. The collection is supported in part by the Ancient Art Council, which offers a speakers program focusing on the ancient world.

The museum contains a representative collection of European art, the largest portion of which is French. Its most distinguished collection is of sculpture by Auguste Rodin. Casts of some of his most famous works are on display, including one of The Thinker in the Court of Honor. Other artists in the collection include El Greco, Titian, Rubens, Rembrandt, Boucher, David, Tiepolo, Gainsborough and many of the Impressionists and post-Impressionists—Degas, Renoir, Monet, Pissarro, Seurat, Cézanne, van Gogh and others.

The Achenbach Foundation for Graphic Arts (AFGA) is responsible for the museum's collection of works on paper. With more than 90,000 items, the AFGA is the largest repository of works of art on paper in the western United States. The department is named for Moore and Hazel Achenbach, who gave the bulk of their collection to the city of San Francisco in 1948, and the remainder upon Moore Achenbach's death in 1963. Many additional acquisitions form the basis for special collections within the department, such as the Anderson Collection of Graphic Arts. Selections from the Logan collection, more than 400 books dating from the nineteenth century to the present, are regularly used in exhibitions in the Reva and David Logan Gallery of Illustrated Books located in a small room off the Hall of Antiquities.

The museum's collection of European Decorative Arts includes a gilded Spanish ceiling from c. 1500; numerous items of furniture, including Horace Walpole’s commode of 1763 from Strawberry Hill House, west of London; and three period rooms, including the Salon Doré from the Hôtel de La Trémoille, Paris, said to be the only complete example of a pre-Revolutionary Parisian salon to be displayed anywhere.

The Bowles Porcelain Gallery displays an array of porcelain and pottery from England and continental Europe with a strong emphasis on the eighteenth century. Adjacent to the gallery is the Ceramic Study Center.

The Contemporary Arts Program, which brings the work of living artists into dialogue with the building and the collections, was inaugurated in 2017 with an exhibition of more than 30 works by Urs Fischer installed throughout the museum. Subsequent exhibitions have featured works and interventions by artists including Lynn Hershman Leeson, Julian Schnabel, Alexandre Singh, and Wangechi Mutu.

Situated off the northwest corner of the Legion grounds is the Holocaust Memorial, a sculptural group of white-painted bronze by George Segal installed in 1984. Although not part of the Legion's collection, the sculpture is often seen by visitors to the museum.

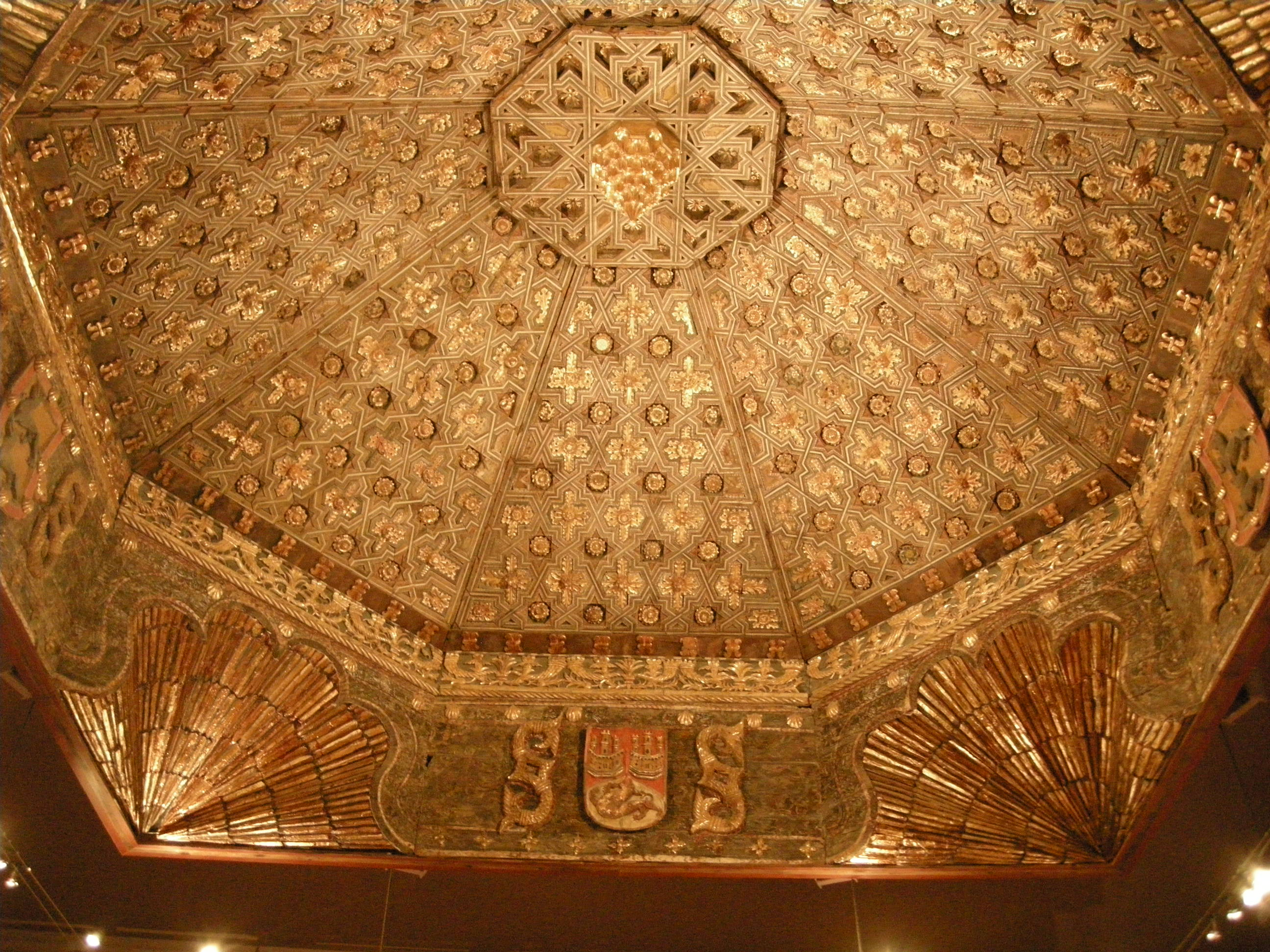
Mudéjar ceiling from Altamira Palace, Torrijos, Spain (c. 1482–1503)

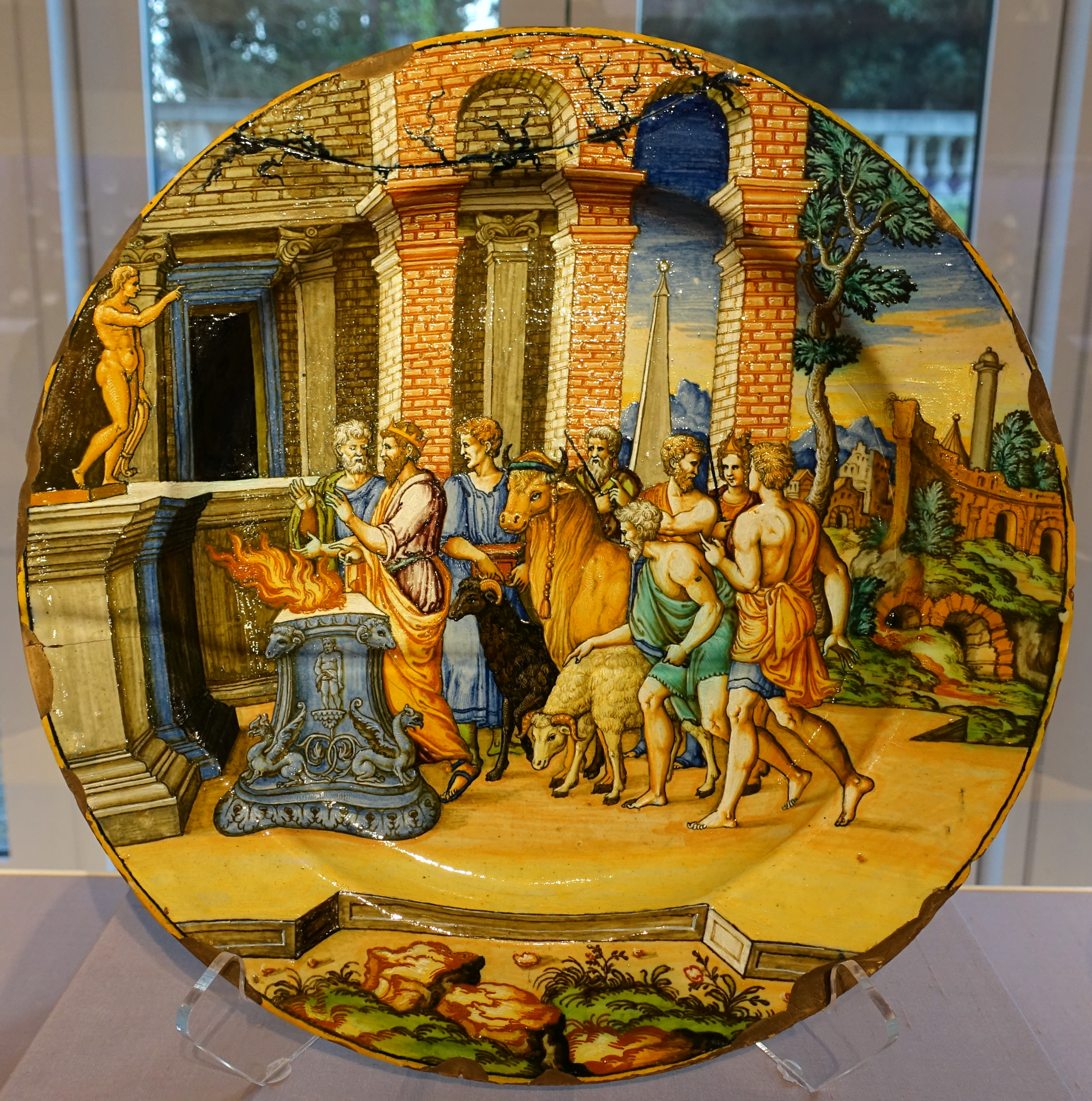
Psyche's Father Consulting the Oracle, Italian (c. 1550–70)

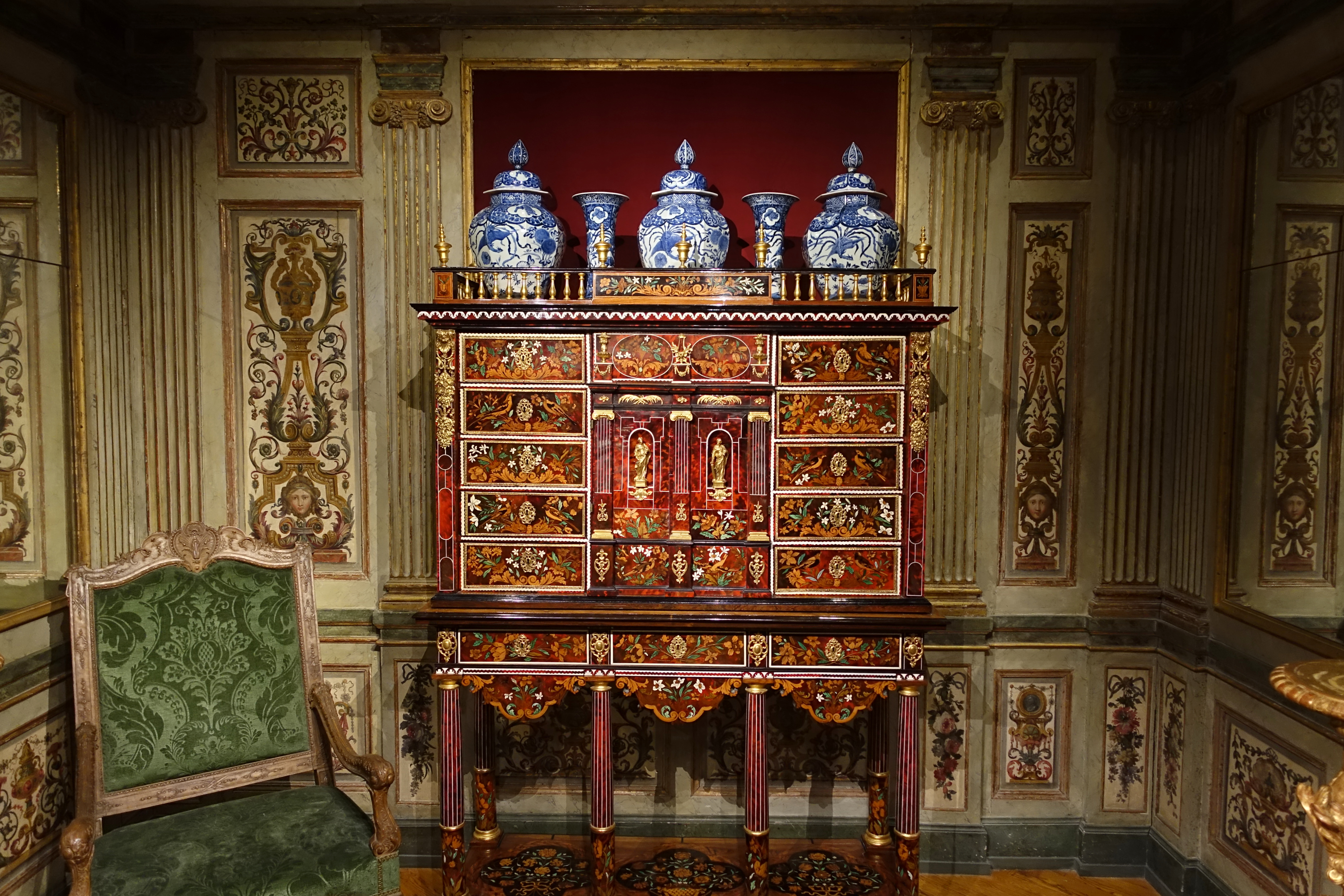
Cabinet, Pierre Gole (c. 1665)

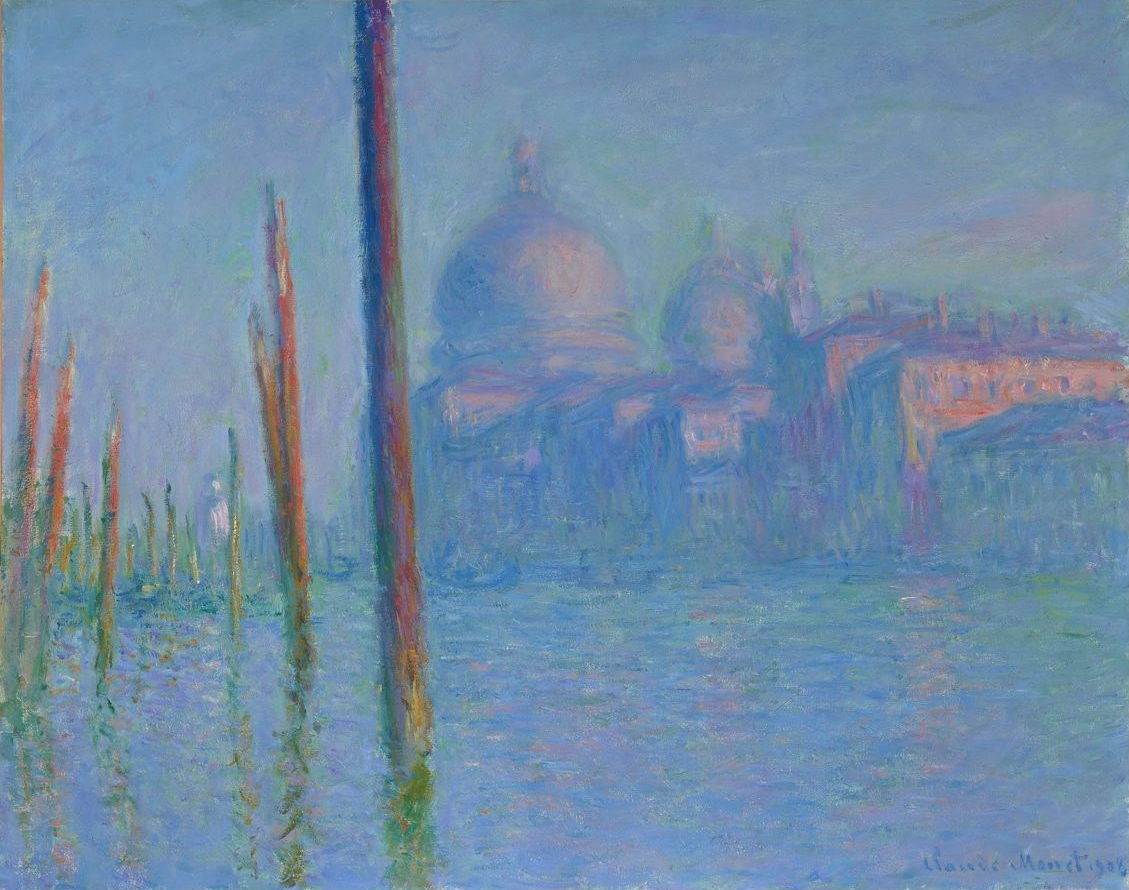
Le Grand Canal, Claude Monet (1881)

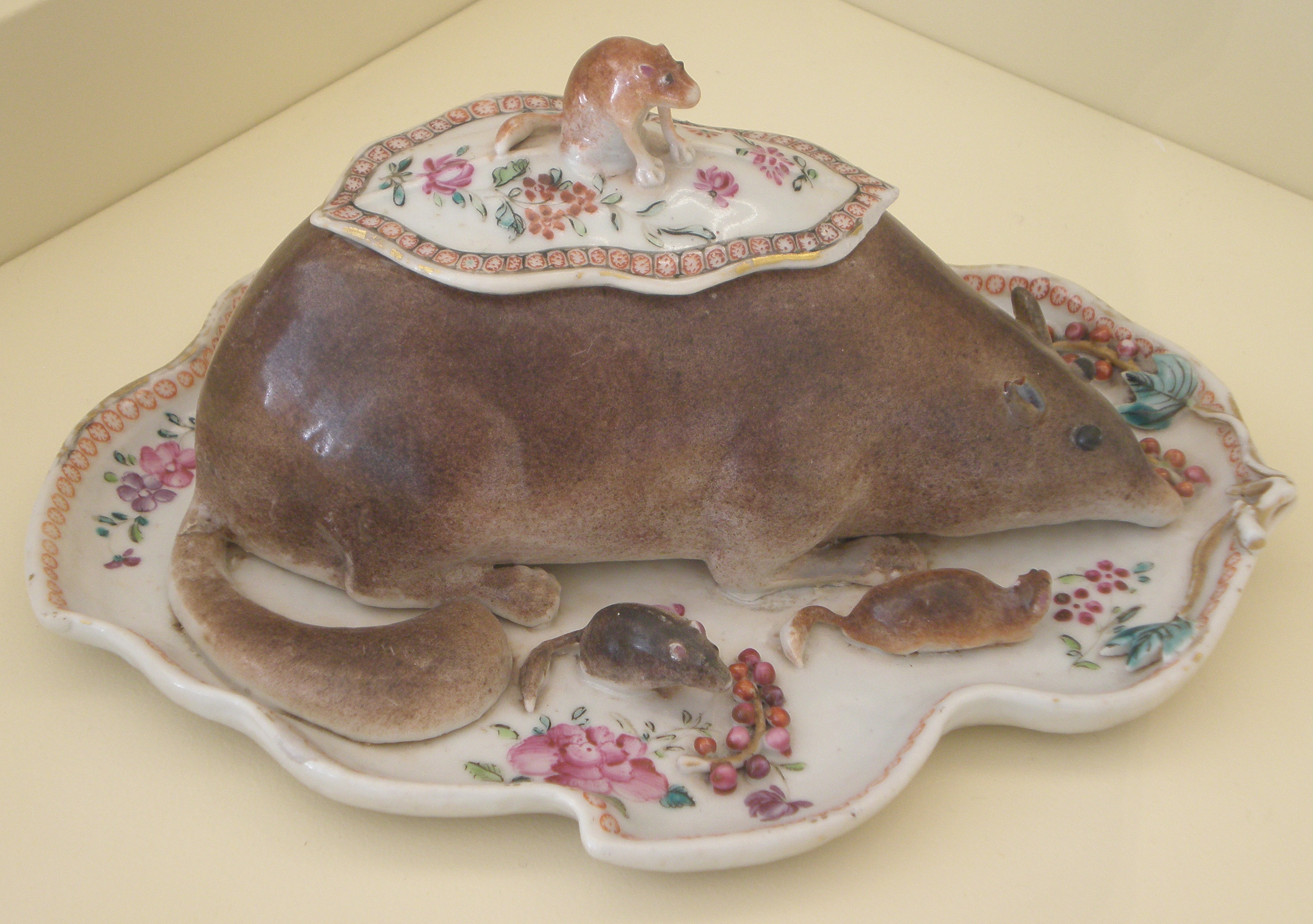
Covered dish in the shape of a dormouse, China (c. 1760)
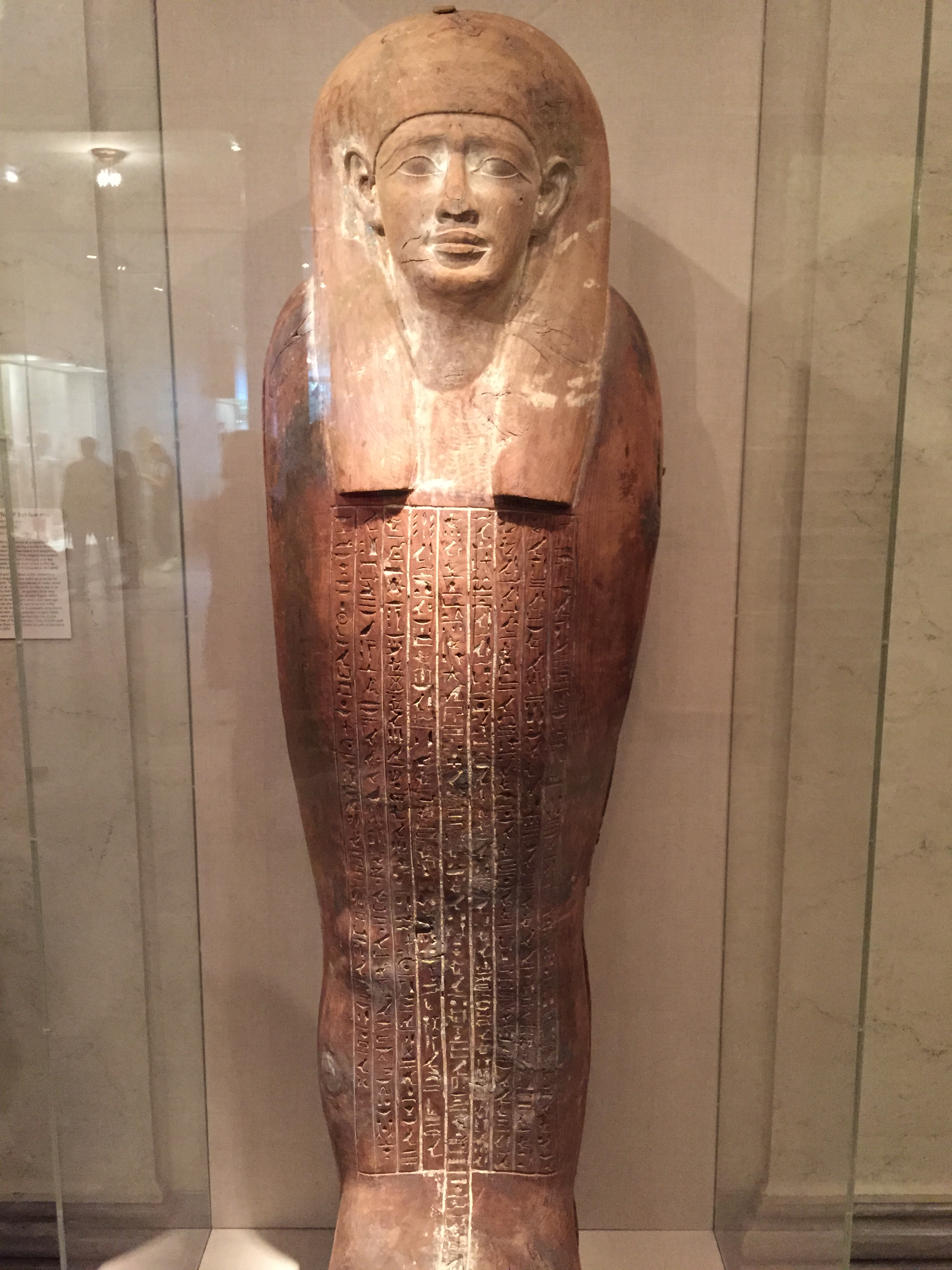
Coffin of Iret-hor-irou, Egyptian (380–43 BC)

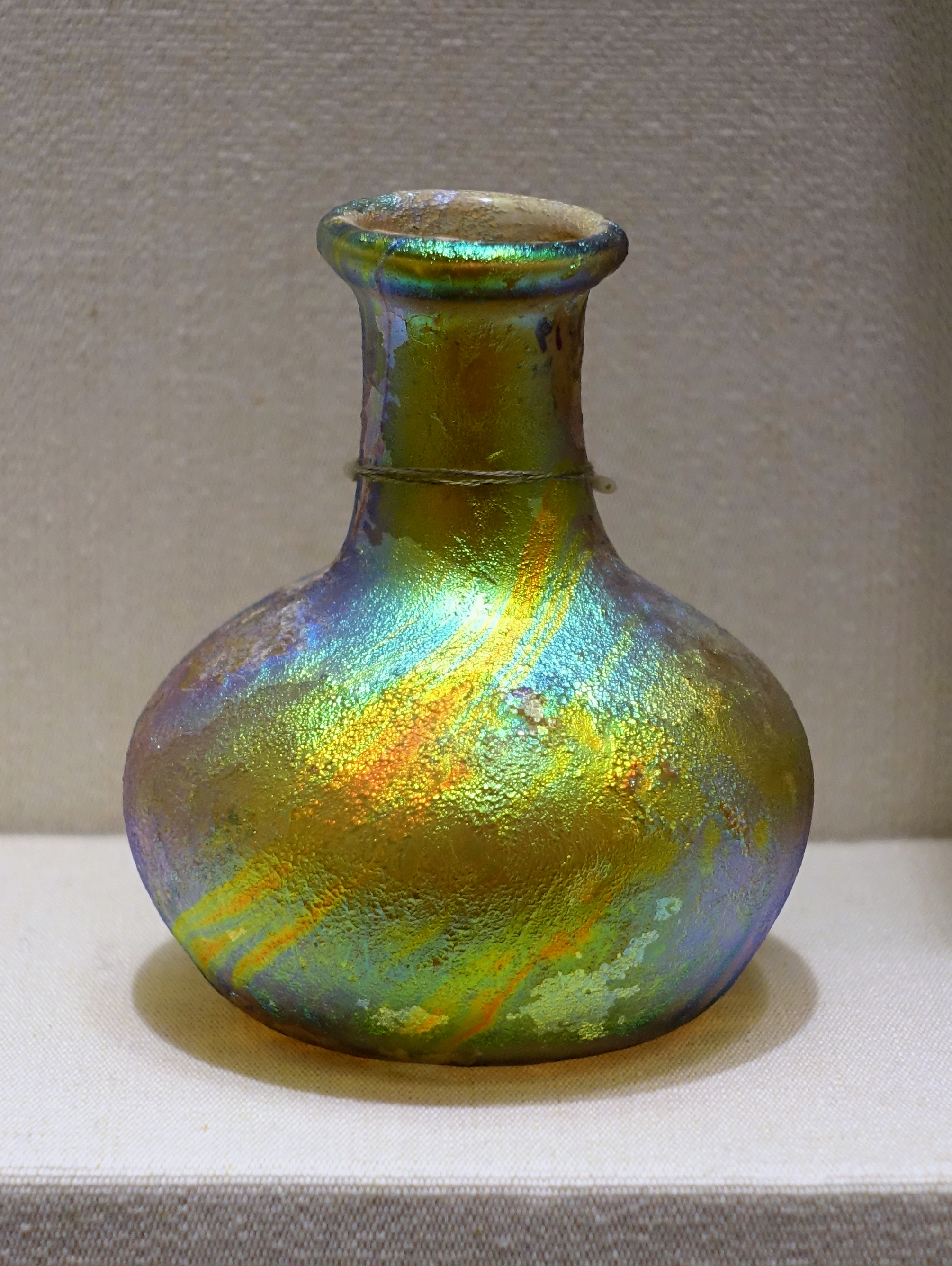
Flask, Eastern Mediterranean (1st century)

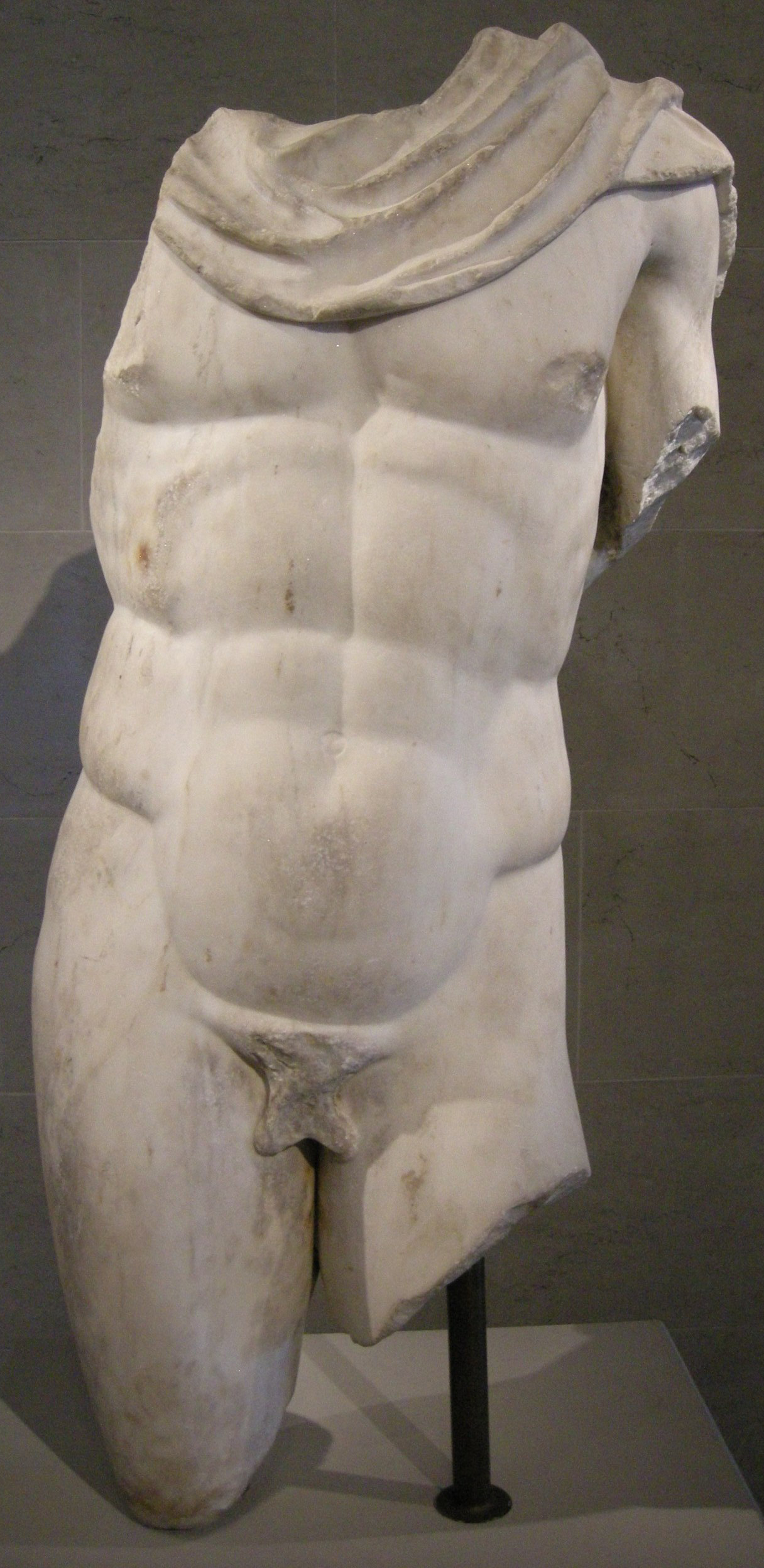
Torso of Hermes, Roman (2nd century)

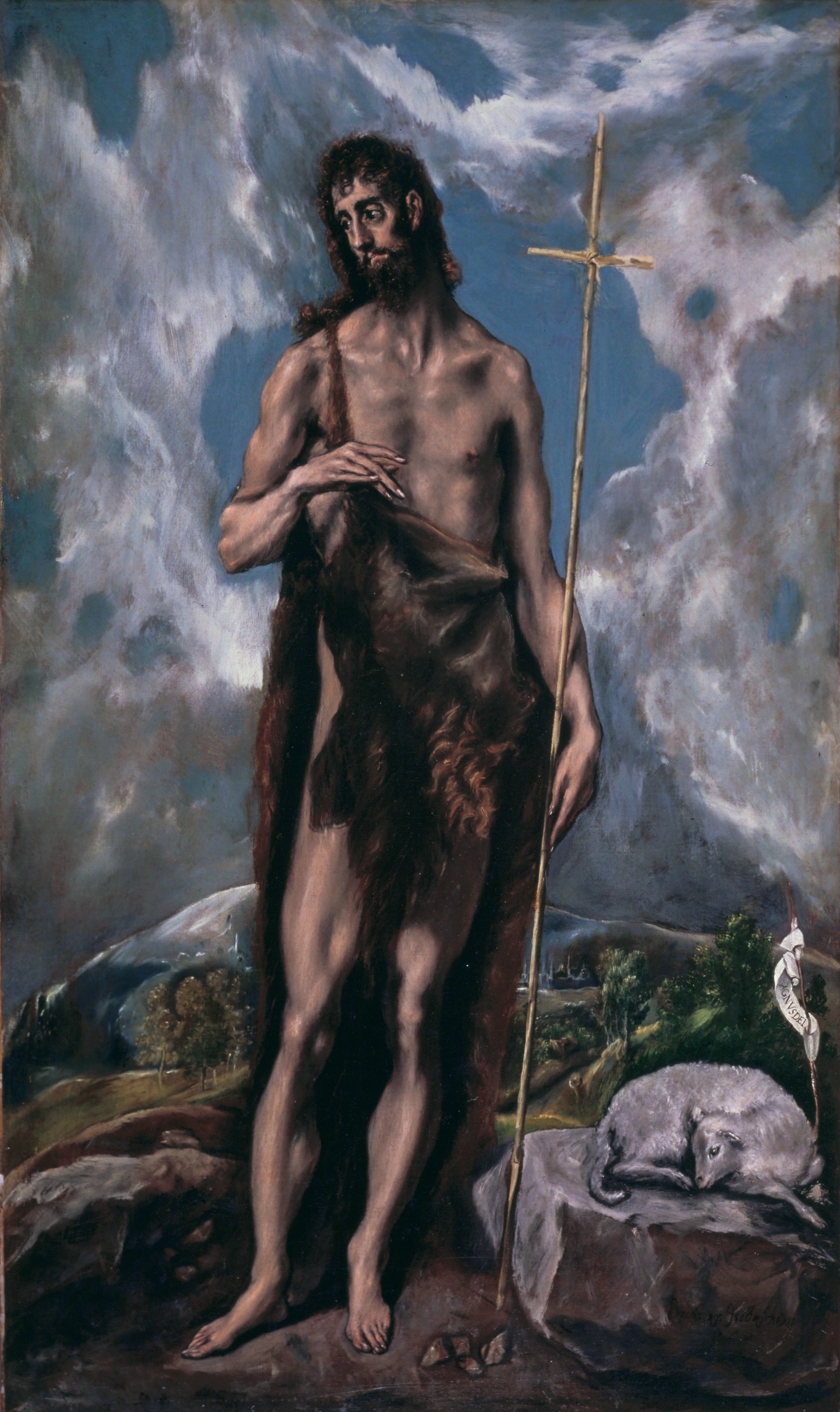
St. John the Baptist, El Greco (c. 1600)

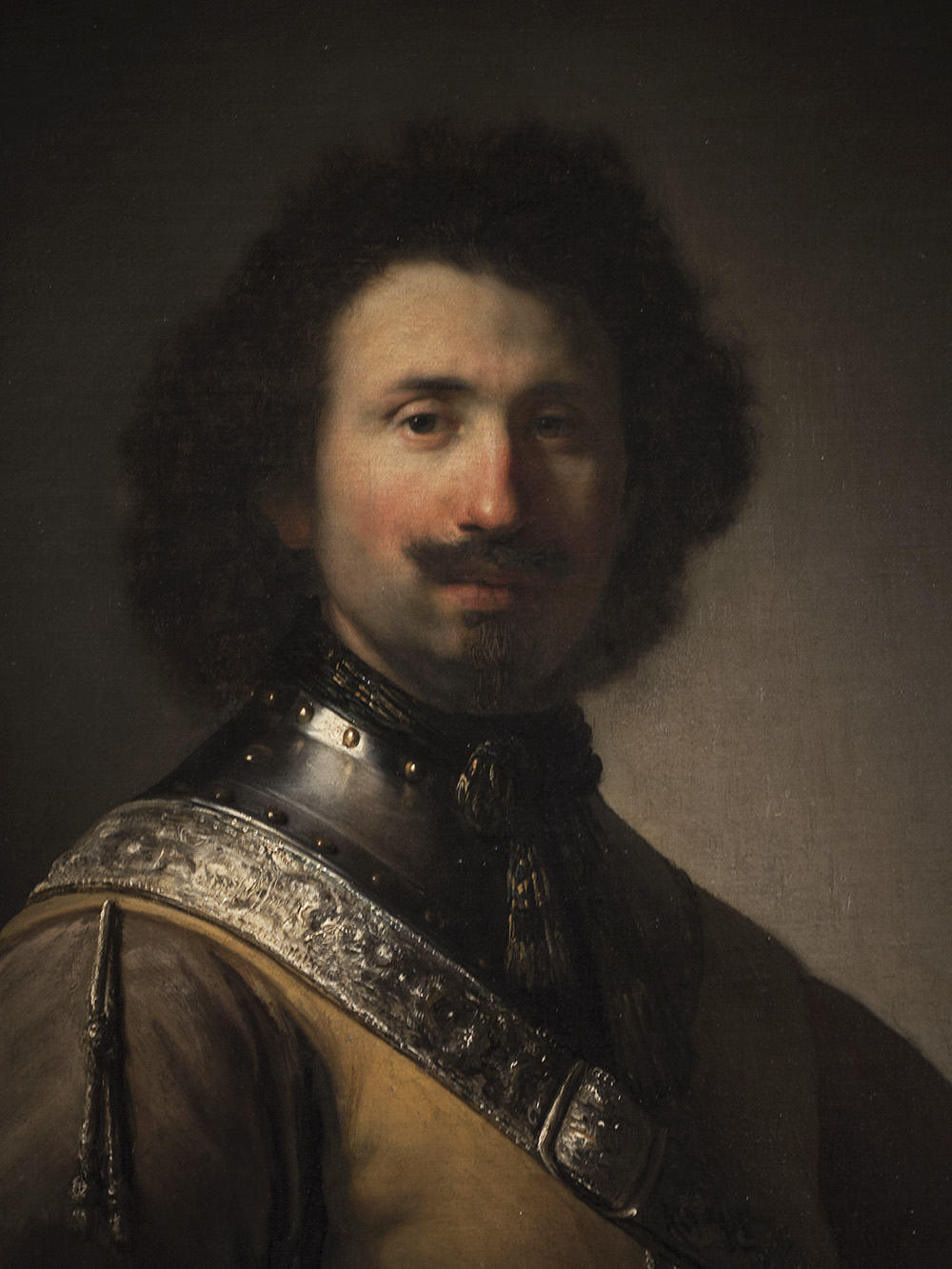
Joris de Caulerij, Rembrandt (1632)

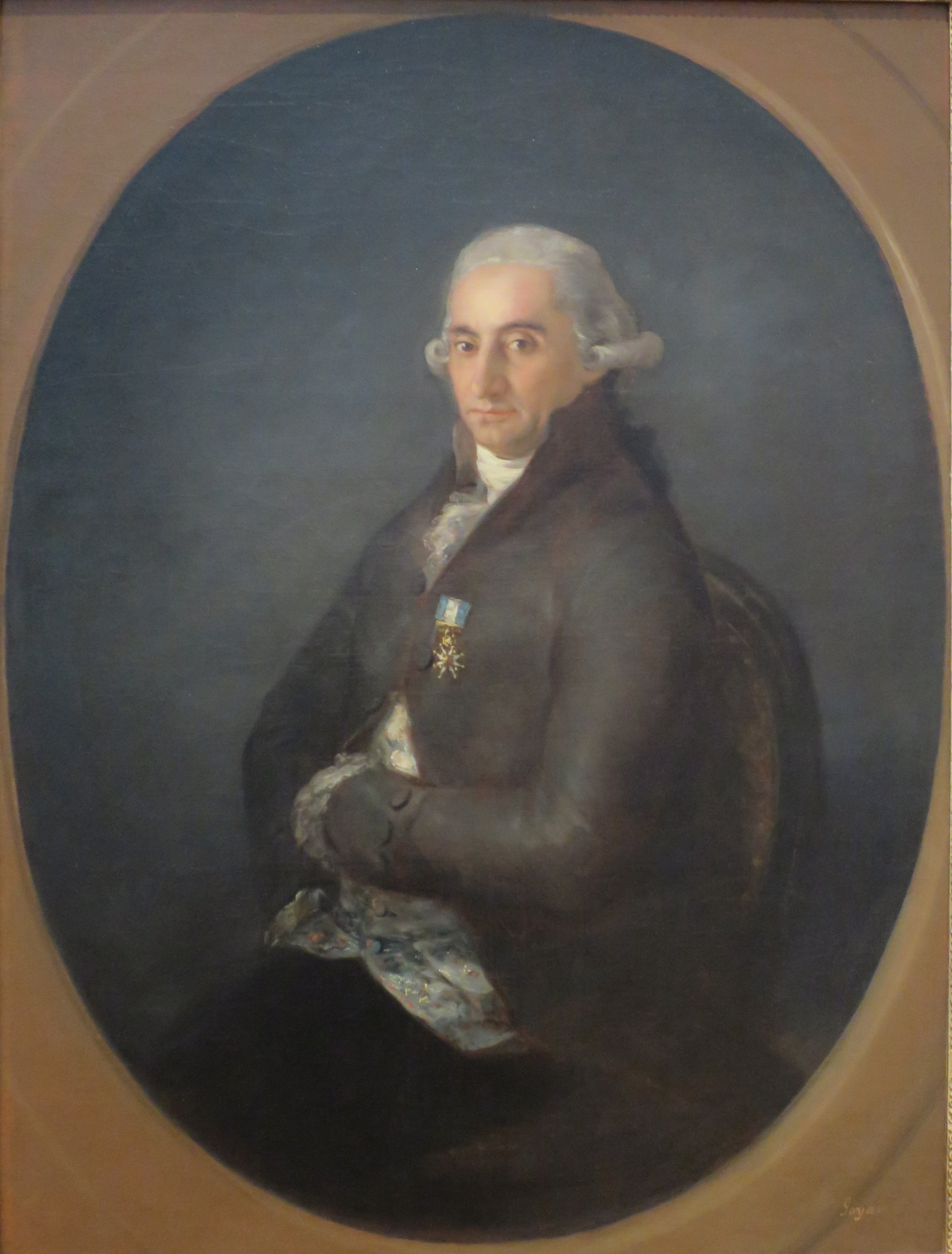
Don Ramón de Posada y Soto Francisco Goya (c. 1801)

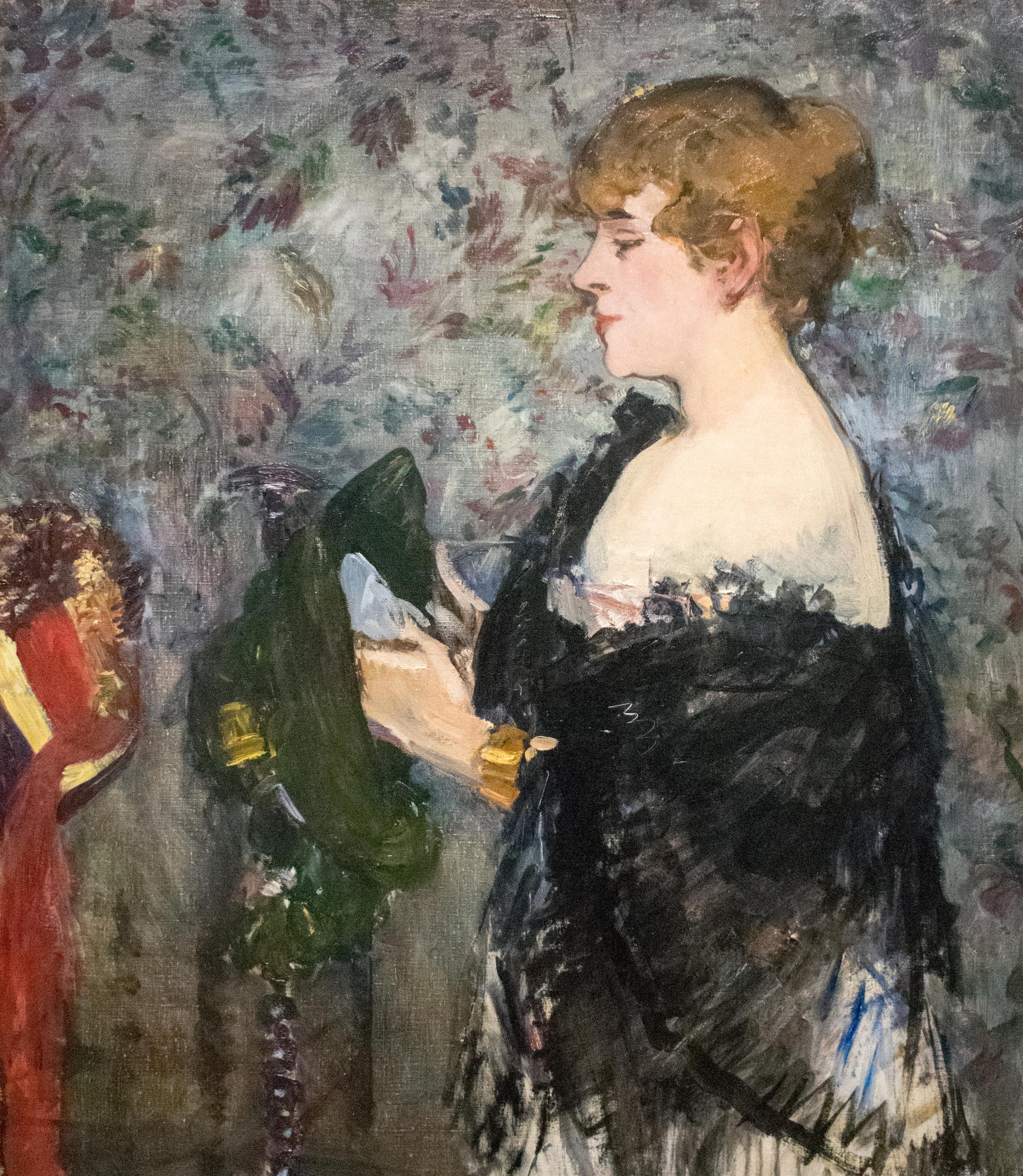
La Modiste, Édouard Manet (1881)

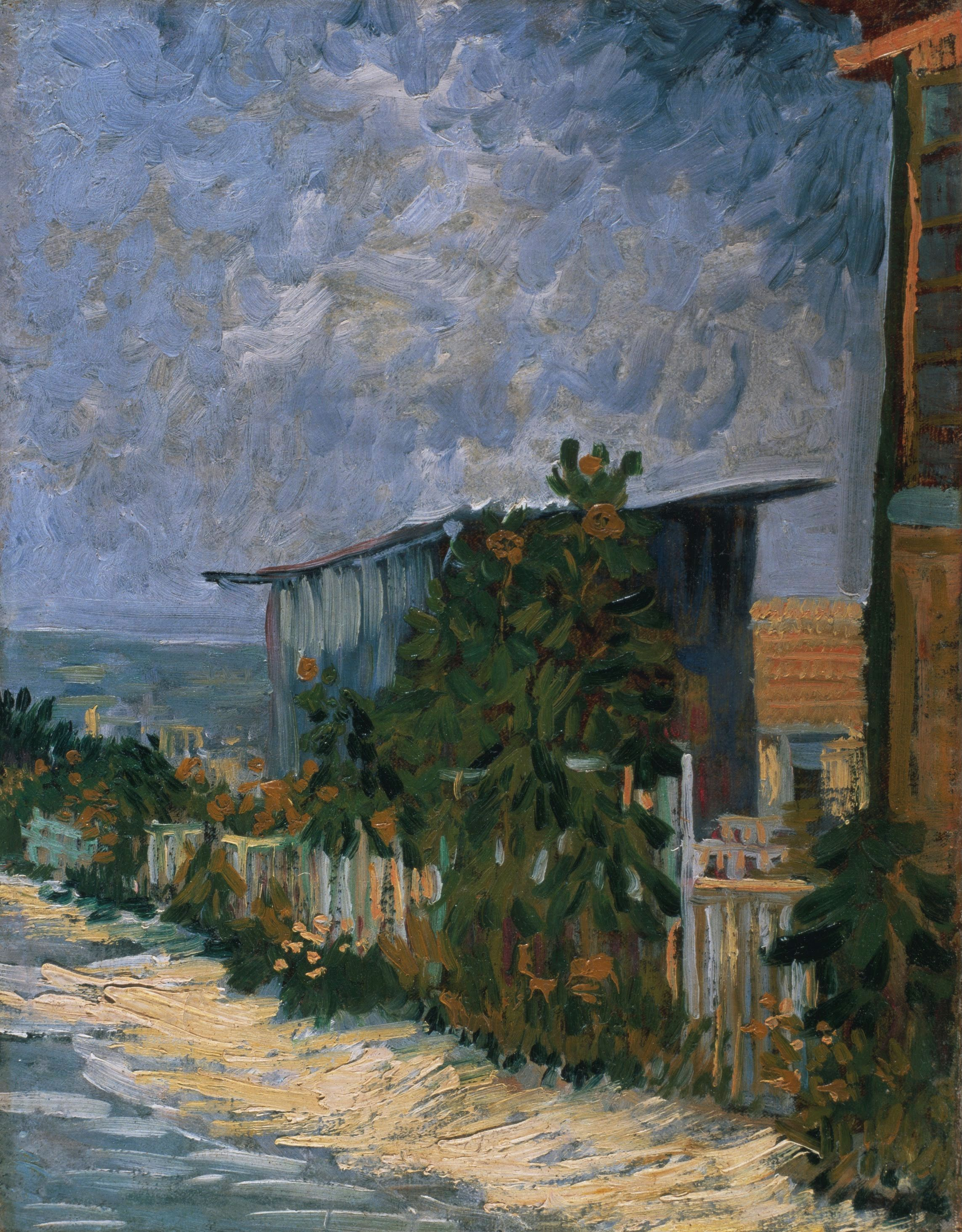
Shelter on Montmartre, Vincent van Gogh (1887)

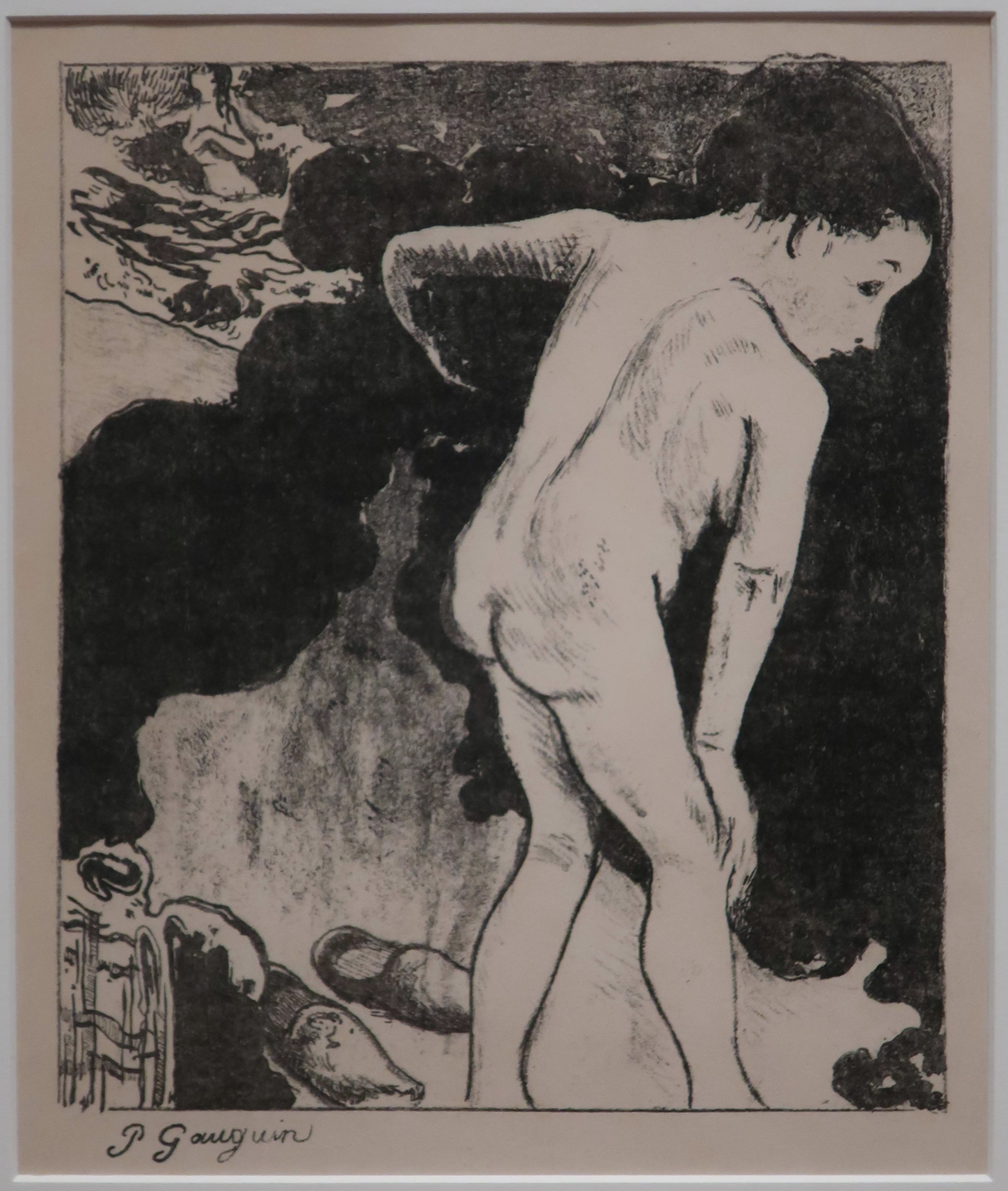
Bathers in Britanny, Paul Gauguin (1889)

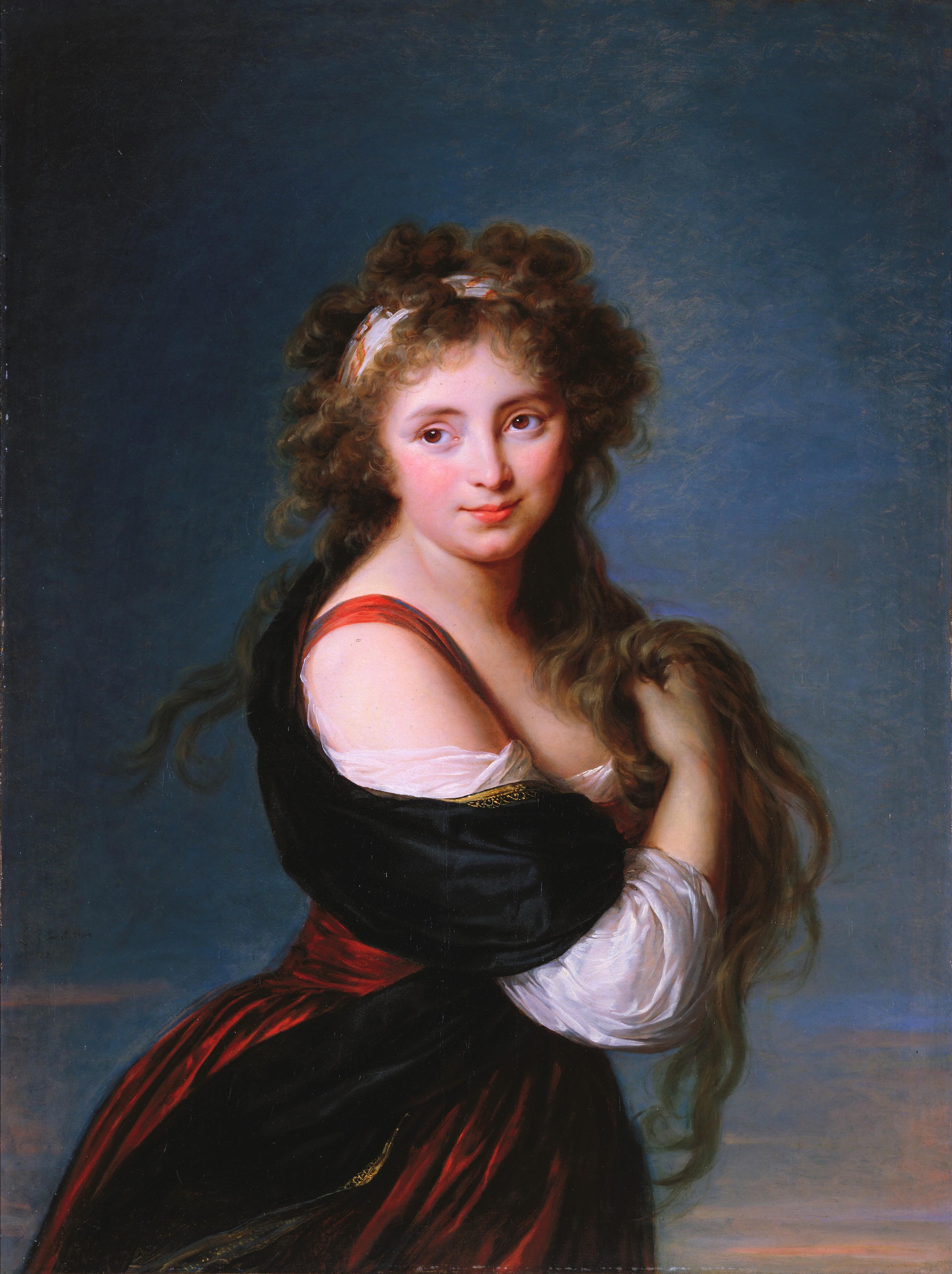
Portrait of Hyacinthe Gabrielle Roland, Élisabeth Vigée Le Brun (1791)

== Spreckels Organ and Gunn Theater ==
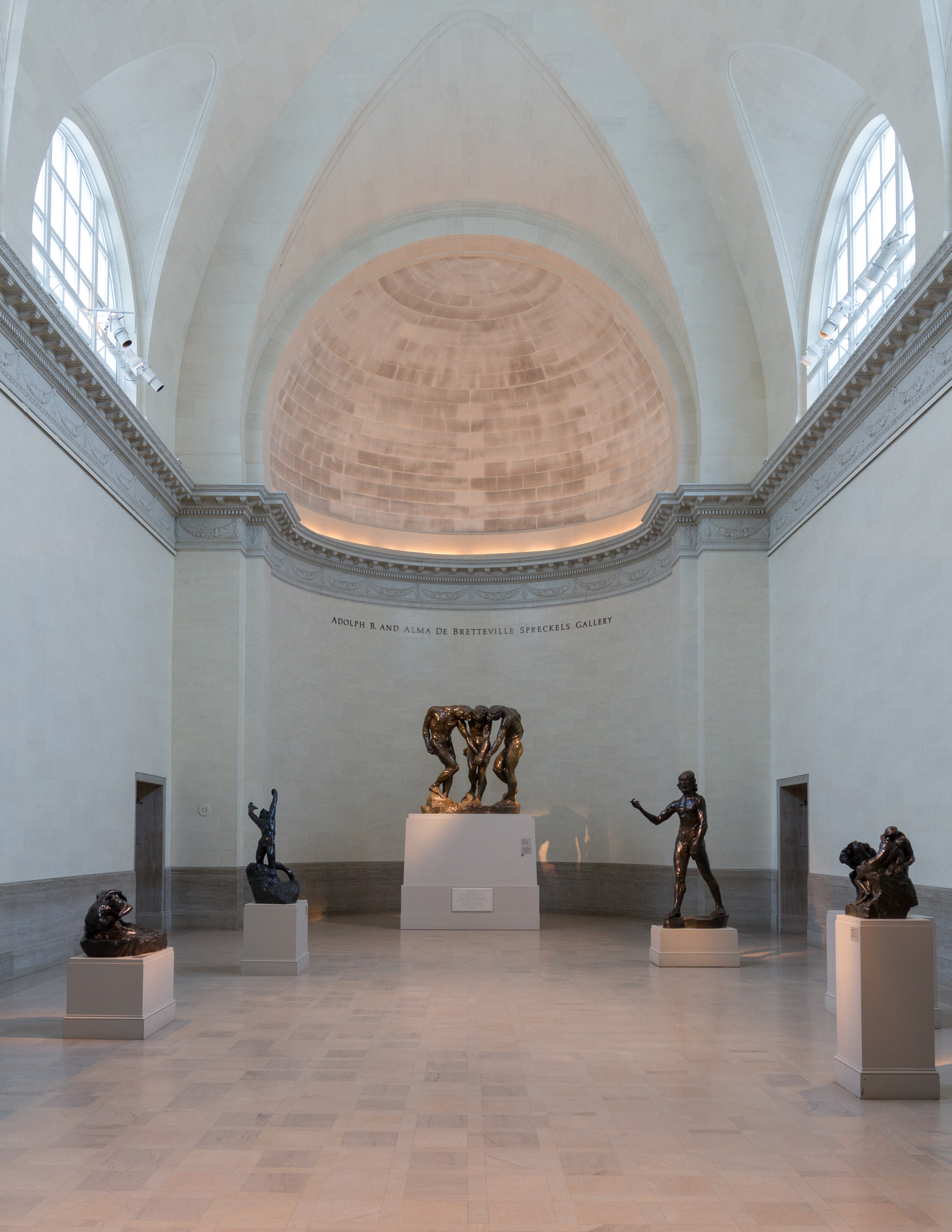
Spreckels Gallery with bronzes by Rodin.

In 1924, John D. Spreckels commissioned the Ernest M. Skinner Company of Boston to build the symphonic organ, which is centrally located in the Spreckels Gallery (gallery 10). It was designed to blend into the museum's structure; its 4,500 pipes are not visible to visitors, hidden behind the trompe-l'œil ceiling painted to resemble a marble apse. Organ concerts are performed every Saturday at 4:00 p.m.

The 316-seat James A. and Cynthia Fry Gunn Theater, located downstairs off the Hall of Antiquities, is a venue for chamber music concerts by the San Francisco Symphony and for lectures and other programs. Architect George Applegarth designed the circular theater and decorated it in the style of Louis XVI. The descending entrance stairways on either side are decorated with portraits by Nicolas de Largillière. The ceiling mural is The Apotheosis of the California Soldier by Spanish artist Julio Vila y Prades.

== Film appearances ==
- In the 1952 thriller Sudden Fear, Lester Blaine (Jack Palance) and Irene Neves (Gloria Grahame) have a clandestine rendezvous at a Bach organ recital at the Legion of Honor.
- The museum plays a major part in the Alfred Hitchcock movie Vertigo (1958) when Scottie (played by James Stewart) follows Madeleine Elster (played by Kim Novak) to the museum, where she stares at one painting for a considerable time. The painting, a portrait of the fictitious Carlotta Valdes, was a prop created specifically for the production by artist John Ferren and is not housed at the museum.
- The character Dr. Crippen (played by Signe Hasso) in The Black Bird, a 1975 comedy sequel to Maltese Falcon, has an office in the Legion of Honor.
- The exterior of the museum appears in several scenes in Brian De Palma's Raising Cain (1992).
- The Legion of Honor appears in the 1993 miniseries Tales of the City, based on the first of the Tales of the City series of novels by Armistead Maupin. The character of Mary Ann Singleton (played by Laura Linney) arranges to meet her neighbor Norman Neal Williams (played by Stanley DeSantis) at the museum.

== See also ==
- 49-Mile Scenic Drive
- De Young Museum
- Holocaust Memorial at California Palace of the Legion of Honor
