= Lincoln Park (San Francisco) =

Park in California, United States

- Lincoln Park, view from near the Palace of the Legion of Honor

- Location within San Francisco County Location within California Location within the United States
- Type: Municipal (San Francisco)
- Location: San Francisco
- Coordinates: 37°47′02″N 122°30′10″W
- Area: 100 acres (0.40 km^{2}; 0.16 sq mi)
- Created: 1909
- Status: Open all year

Lincoln Park is a park located on the West Side of San Francisco, California. It was dedicated to president Abraham Lincoln in 1909 and includes about 100 acres (0.4 km^{2}) of the northwestern corner of the San Francisco Peninsula. Lincoln Park park hosts the Legion of Honor Museum of art and is the western terminus of the Lincoln Highway, the first automobile road across the United States.

== History ==
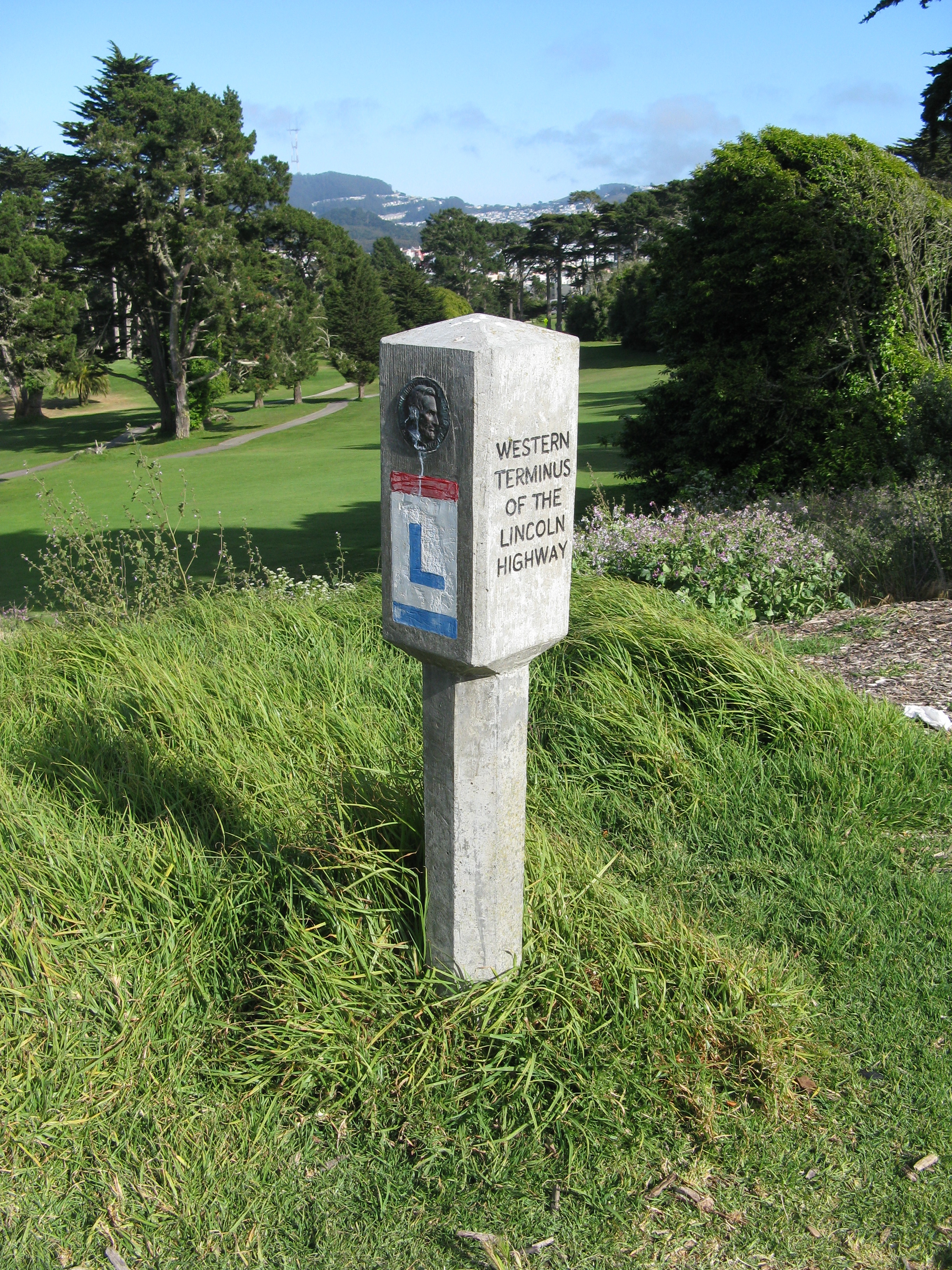
Western terminus of the Lincoln Highway-San Francisco

The land on which Lincoln Park stands was the city-owned Golden Gate Cemetery, established in 1868. It held about 10,000 remains and included a Chinese burial ground and a potter's field.

In 1902, golf enthusiasts laid out a three-hole course on part of the land. In 1909, the Board of Supervisors turned the land over to the Parks Commission, and cemetery relocation began. The golf course expanded to 14 holes by 1914, then to a full 18 holes in 1917. During this period of development 54 acres (220,000 m^{2}) of the original tract were turned over to the federal government to be added to the neighboring Fort Miley Military Reservation.

The Lincoln Highway, with its western terminus at Lincoln Park, was conceived and mapped in 1913 as the first coast-to-coast road across America, traversing 14 states. The original western terminus marker of the highway was located at the north end of the plaza and fountain in front of the Legion of Honor. Today, a replica of the western terminus marker and an interpretive plaque are located at the southeast corner of the plaza, next to the bus stop. The replica marker was placed in 2002 during the Lincoln Highway Association's 10th Annual National Convention.

In 1920, the park was chosen as the site of the California Palace of the Legion of Honor, which opened in 1924. The San Francisco Holocaust Memorial, designed by George Segal, was dedicated in the park in November 1984.
