= Altamira Palace =

Demolished building in Torrijos, Spain

- Palacio de Altamira
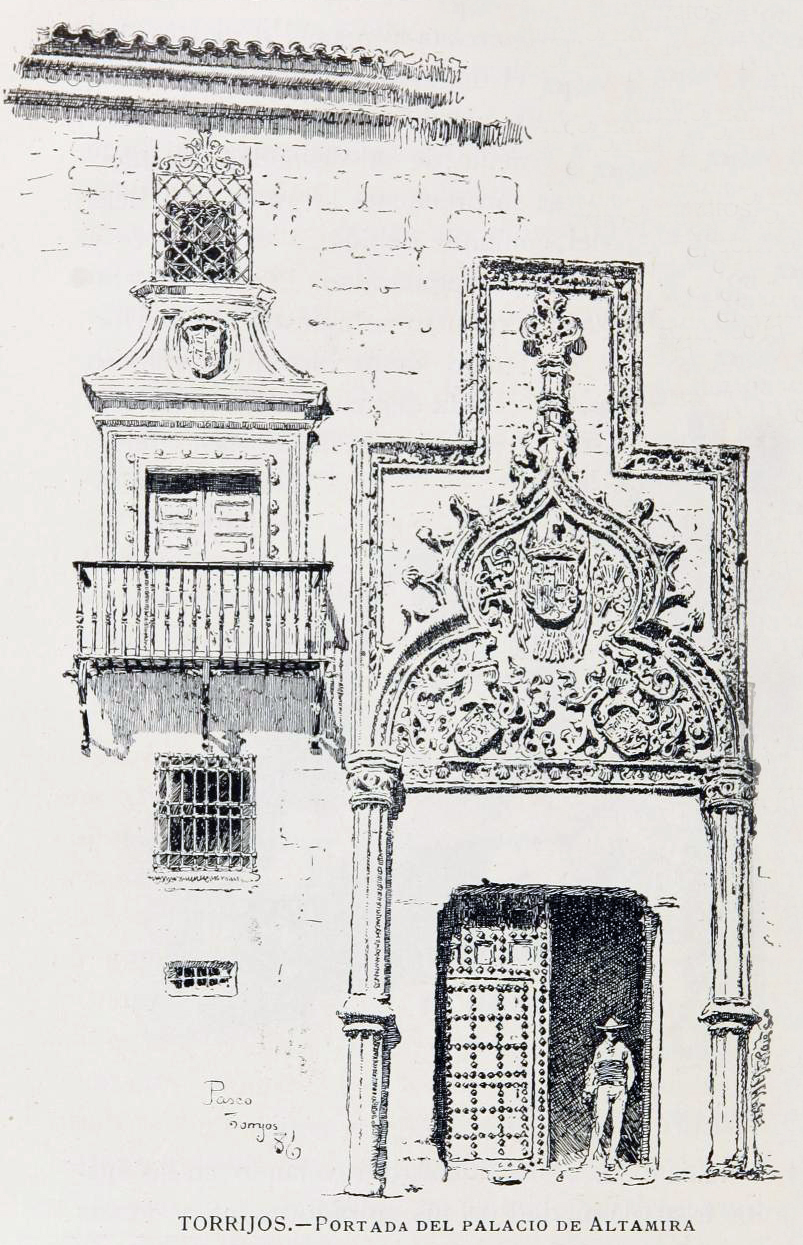

General information
- Status: Demolished
- Architectural style: Isabelline, Renaissance, Mudéjar
- Location: Torrijos, Spain
- Coordinates: 39°58′50.71″N 4°17′6.07″W
- Year built: 15th century
- Destroyed: Beginning of the 20th century

The Altamira Palace (Spanish: Palacio de Altamira) was a building in the Spanish town of Torrijos, in the province of Toledo. A remarkable example of late 15th century architecture in the region, it was a fusion of different styles, with a Renaissance courtyard and façade, a Gothic-Isabelline portal and several Mudejar roofs in the interior. The building was dismantled at the beginning of the 20th century, and the portal and four coffered ceilings were preserved and are now in various museums. It was located on the west side of the current Plaza de España.

== History ==
It was located in the town of Torrijos, Toledo. Vicente Lampérez y Romea said that it had an "arrogant Gothic portal and magnificent Mudejar halls". It was ordered to be built at the end of the 15th century by Gutierre de Cárdenas and Teresa Enríquez. The Diccionario geográfico-estadístico-histórico de España y sus posesiones de Ultramar by Pascual Madoz located one of its facades in the then Plaza de la Constitución. This work described the palace as follows:

... large and old building, with a conserved portal, stairway and 4 halls with domes of carved and gilded wood coffered ceilings, and many disfigured arabesques with the whitewashes in the walls and stairway. The patio is a square with corridors, of ashlar stone, and 2 bodies of architecture, the inferior being Doric and the superior being Ionic, similar to those of Juan de Herrera, which are conserved in Toledo, and it is even tradition that it was rebuilt by Herrera. The exterior facade of the palace is also of stone with carved balconies...

The portal of the building appeared in the volume dedicated to New Castile in the series España, sus monumentos y sus artes, su naturaleza e historia, in a drawing by Josep Pascó in 1886. The palace, which by 1894 belonged to "Braulio Montero y á la sucesión de D. José Gallarza, vecinos de Torrijos", was in the hands of Enrique Villanueva Hilanderas and Teófilo Díaz Prieto at the beginning of the century. Having disappeared in the early years of the 20th century, it was for Francisco Alcántara "one of the most typical examples of Castilian civil architecture, one of those where the Renaissance, Gothic and Mudejar styles harmonize in facades, patios, monumental staircases, coffered ceilings, atauriques, carvings and tiles."

The four roofs of the palace are preserved: a dome in the National Archaeological Museum in Madrid, another roof preserved in the Legion of Honor Museum in California, another in the castle of Villandry in France and the last one in the Victoria and Albert Museum in London. The portal ended in the private estate El Alamín de Santa Cruz de Retamar, on the facade of a chapel.

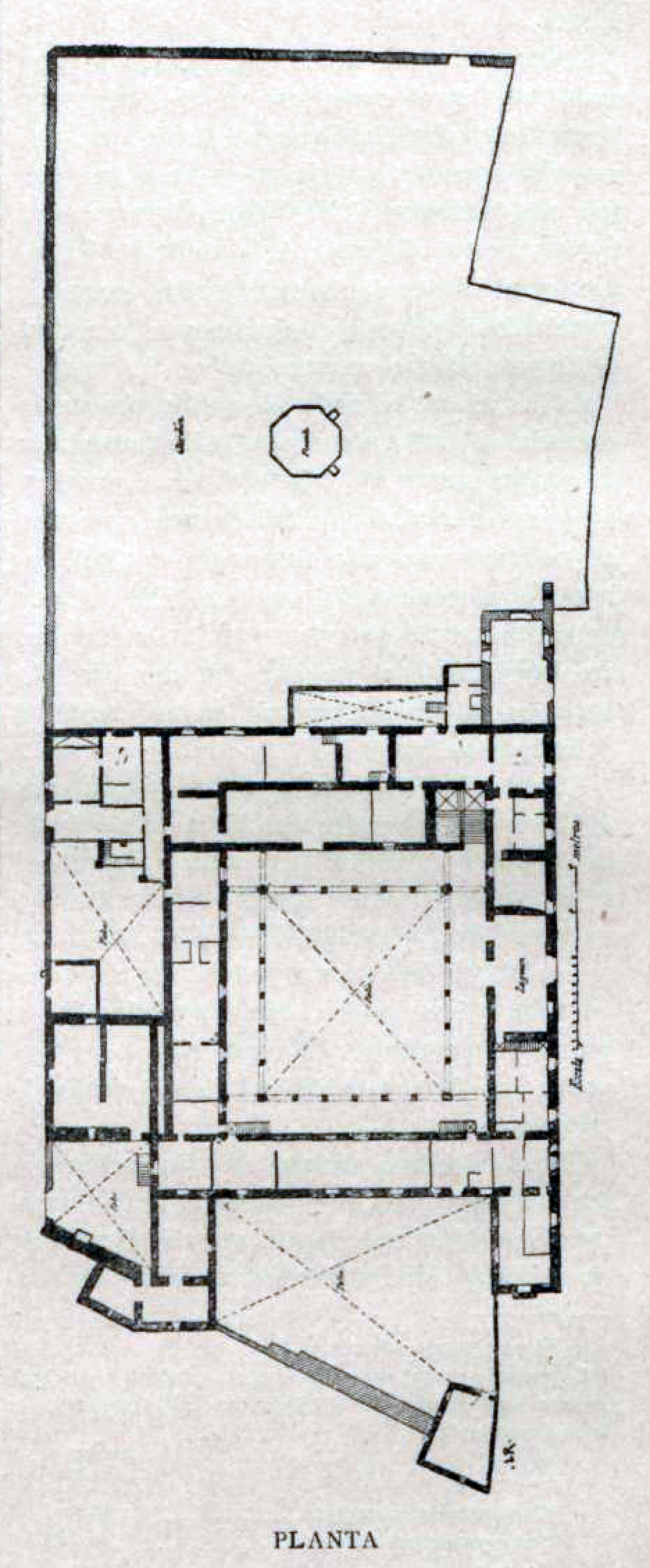
Floor plan of the building.

== Description ==
In its facade, rebuilt and added in the time of Philip II, the portal, belonging to the last period of the ogival architecture, was respected. It was composed of a great lintel supported by smooth jambs flanked by brackets or columns forming pilasters which, crowned by their capitals joined by a band or impost of the same width that ran over the lintel, supported the ends of the great trilobate ogee arch, formed by a molding ornamented with climbing fronds and figures, bordered by cresting and finished by a slender pinnacle, enclosing everything in a frame, according to a form that was commonly used at that time. Inside the arch, the royal coat of arms occupied the main place, supported by the eagle of the Catholic Monarchs, and their emblems on both sides - the yoke and arrows - and below, inclined as a sign of compliance, the coats of arms of the founders, crowned by crests from which hung wide lambrequins, filling the resulting spaces. The rest of the façade, made entirely of granite masonry, had the severity and style that characterize the works of the architect Herrera and his imitators and disciples. It consisted of four orders of openings, corresponding to the basement, mezzanine or ground, main and second floors, consisting of windows for all with iron bars, except the main floor, which had ten large balconies, of almost square proportions, decorated with ledges, jambs, lintels and coats of arms on them, and provided with large wrought iron flying parapets.

Inside, after crossing a wide hallway with a coffered ceiling, was an almost square large courtyard, measuring about 22 × 20 m, formed by two sets of superimposed arcades, with monolithic columns of Doric order, voussoired circular arches and a simple archivolt, having six in the line on each side of the courtyard; the main floor, similar to the first floor, had stone balustrades, and the galleries of both floors, which had widths of about 4 m, had exposed carved wooden ceilings. Undoubtedly, the courtyard was rebuilt at the same time as the facade, as it bore the stamp of the austere constructions that characterized the reign of Philip II; but when it was rebuilt, the entrances to the staircase and other rooms of the palace were preserved, some decorated in the Ogival style, others in the Mudejar style and some in the Renaissance style, with curious details that could hardly be seen in the late 19th century, as the walls were whitewashed with several successive layers of lime grout. The courtyard was surrounded by wide corridors, one on each side, extending those on the east and west, and two adjoining ones to the north, with several additions that left three courtyards with facades to the south facing the Plaza del Caño Nuevo, to the west facing the Calle de Jerindote and to the north the extensive fenced garden, whose area was about half of the total area of the property.

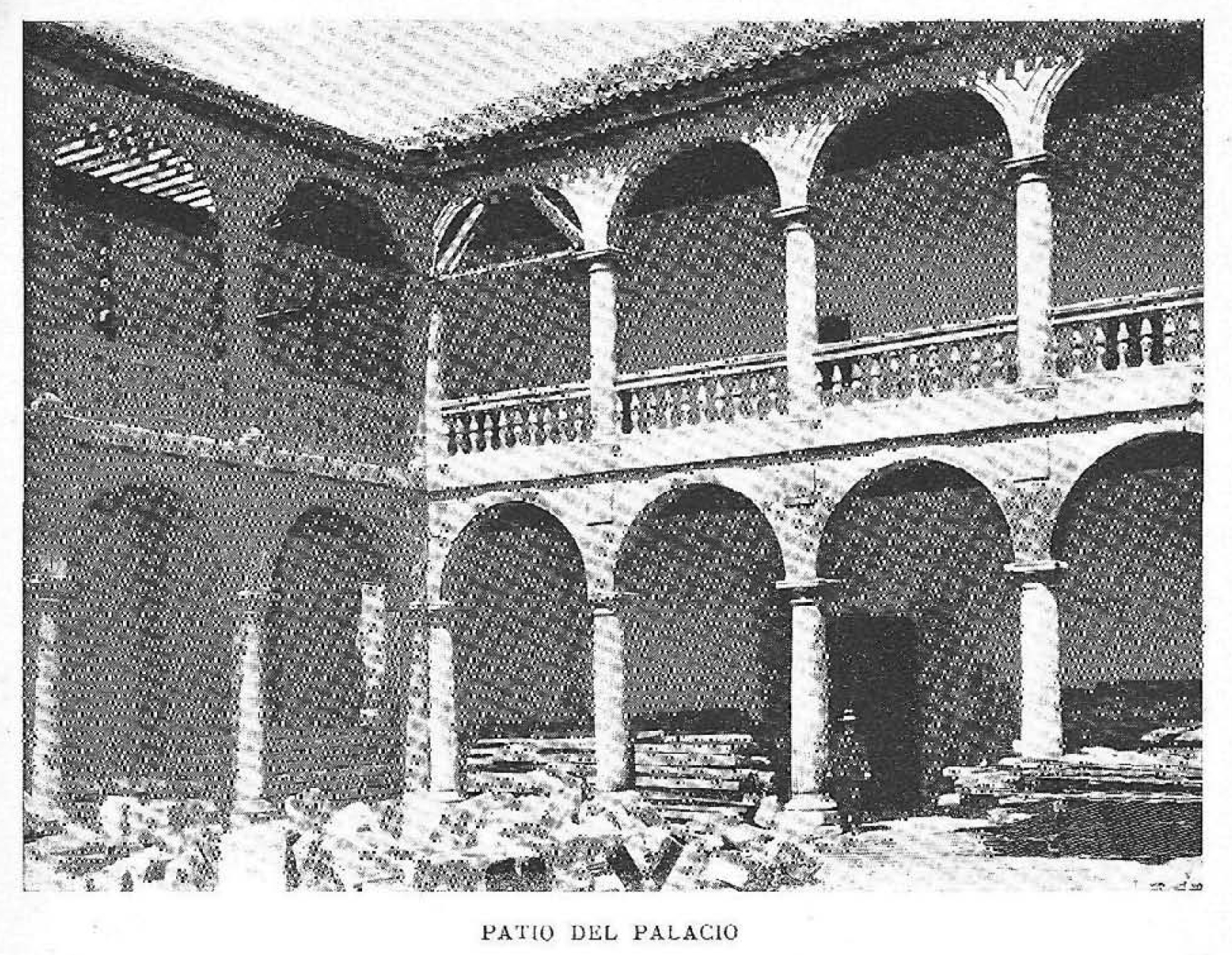
Courtyard of the palace circa 1902.

The staircase, located to the right of the entrance to the courtyard, had an openwork slate stone railing and Ogival style, and the pillar or railing starter was formed by a marble column crowned with a wide capital, on which a lion was seen lying down. It led to the cloister or upper gallery, in which different doors opened that gave entrance to several halls arranged in the bays on each side of the courtyard. Four of these halls, of square plan and corresponding two to the bay of the main façade and to both sides of the great hall in its center, one at the end of the north bay and the fourth at the south bay, were crowned with beautiful coffered domes in the Mudejar style, and their walls and roof trusses rose above those of the rest of the building, like towers. These domes, although of similar dimensions and shapes, were all different.

The first room, located to the northeast of the building, was about 5.50 m on a side, and its smooth walls, intended to be covered with tapestries, ended at a convenient height by a strip about 30 cm wide occupied by an inscription of ornate Gothic letters. On it, there was a wide frieze of stucco decorated with interlacing, and in its angles, in order to pass from the square to the octagonal form, they started elegant wooden pendentives formed with stalactites in the Arab taste. These supported another band of about 70 cm wide, checkered and decorated in its centers with large pilgrim shells, on which there was another octagonal frieze, separated from it with moldings, where four coats of arms stood on the shells. A circular crown stood on the last frieze, and from it began the hemispherical dome curdled with arabesque tracery. The work was gilded and painted in blue and red, producing soft tones of great richness.

The second small hall had a large arabesque stucco frieze on the upper part of the walls. On top of it, a wooden band with ornaments, and above it, another band with inscriptions in ornate kufic characters. It was followed by an octagonal frieze with pendentives of trumpets in the form of shells and decorated with shields. The cover was of octagonal pavilion, also decorated with bows and shells, and, like the previous one, was gilded and painted in blue and red. In this room, there were two doors with arabesque lintels, and the balcony was decorated in the same way.

The ceiling of the third room was similar to the previous one, although richer. It had its stucco frieze, which rose above a band with Arabic inscriptions, and above it began the wooden construction, with a band decorated in the Moorish style, another decorated and checkered, trumpets in the angles with coats of arms, two decorated bands and the cover forming a double octagonal coffered ceiling, divided into sixteen compartments, plus the central one, from which hung a pina. The timbers that accused the structure formed loops, and the coffers were occupied by stars and other ornaments, without missing the pilgrim's shells, an obligatory motif of decoration in all these coffered ceilings. This coffered ceiling was dominated by gold with sober touches of blue, red and white.

The fourth room had a coffered ceiling in worse condition than the previous ones, simpler in shape and details, and its lower frieze, with an ogival design, was not very wide, with painted bands rising above it and the pendentives in the angles to support the octagonal dome, which had no divisions and was decorated with geometric tracery.

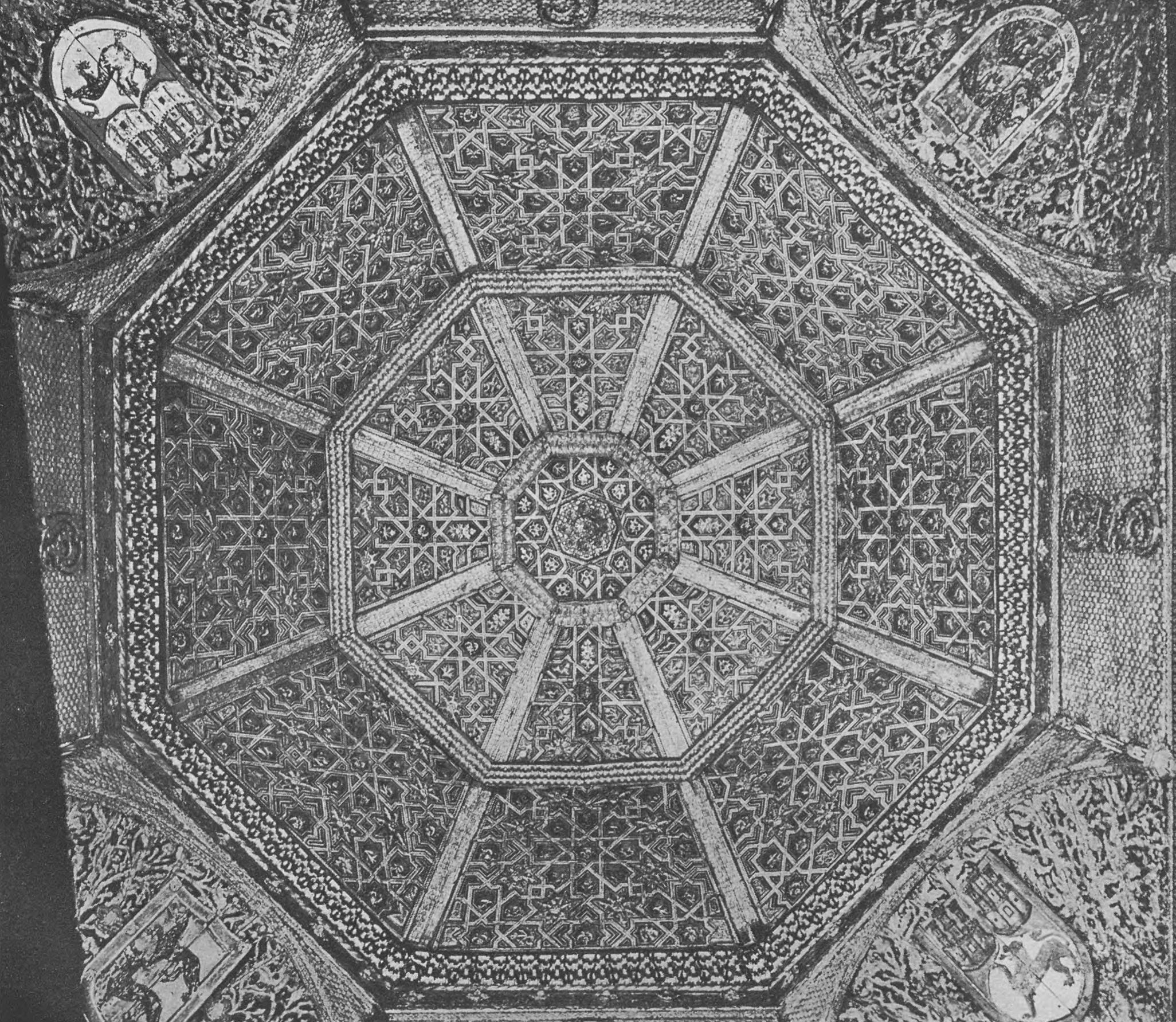
Coffered ceiling, located at the Victoria and Albert Museum, in London.

In addition to the four coffered ceilings described above, there was another plan in a room adjoining the first one, which was apparently more modern and composed of carved beams forming deep square coffers, but with rounded angles, so that they would present an octagonal shape: the center of these was occupied by a carved star, and at the crossroads of the beams there were two pines of the same type. An arabesque frieze crowned the walls of this room. In several other halls, the ceilings were also formed by simple coffered ceilings, made up of beams supported by carved corbels and stretches of regular coffers, with their saetines and flashings. The distribution of the partitions underwent various transformations to accommodate the different needs that the owners and tenants tried to satisfy; but, in general, it consisted of large halls and comfortable stables; and also an extensive garden with fountains and a pond.

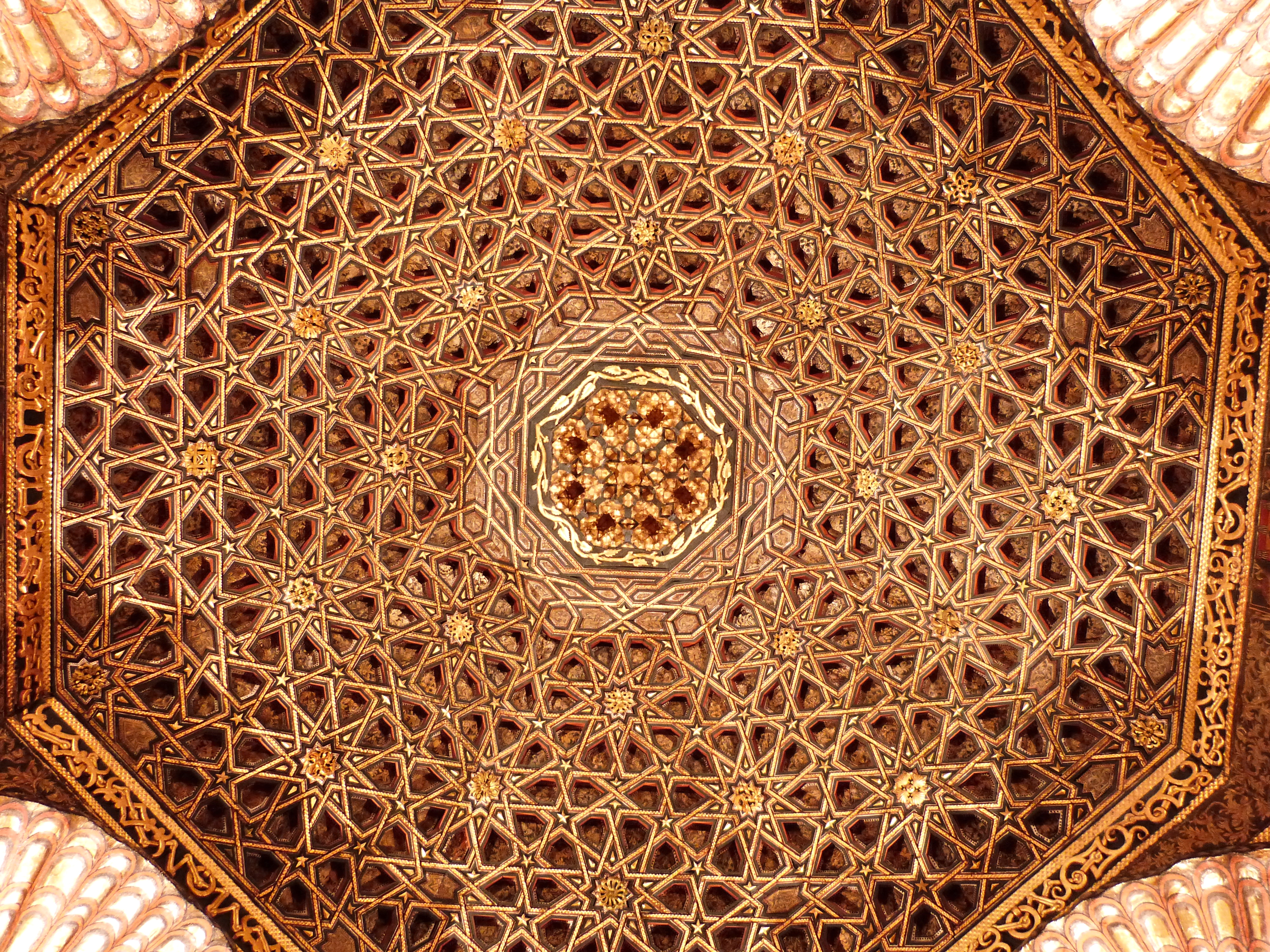
Coffered ceiling, located at the castle of Villandry, in France.

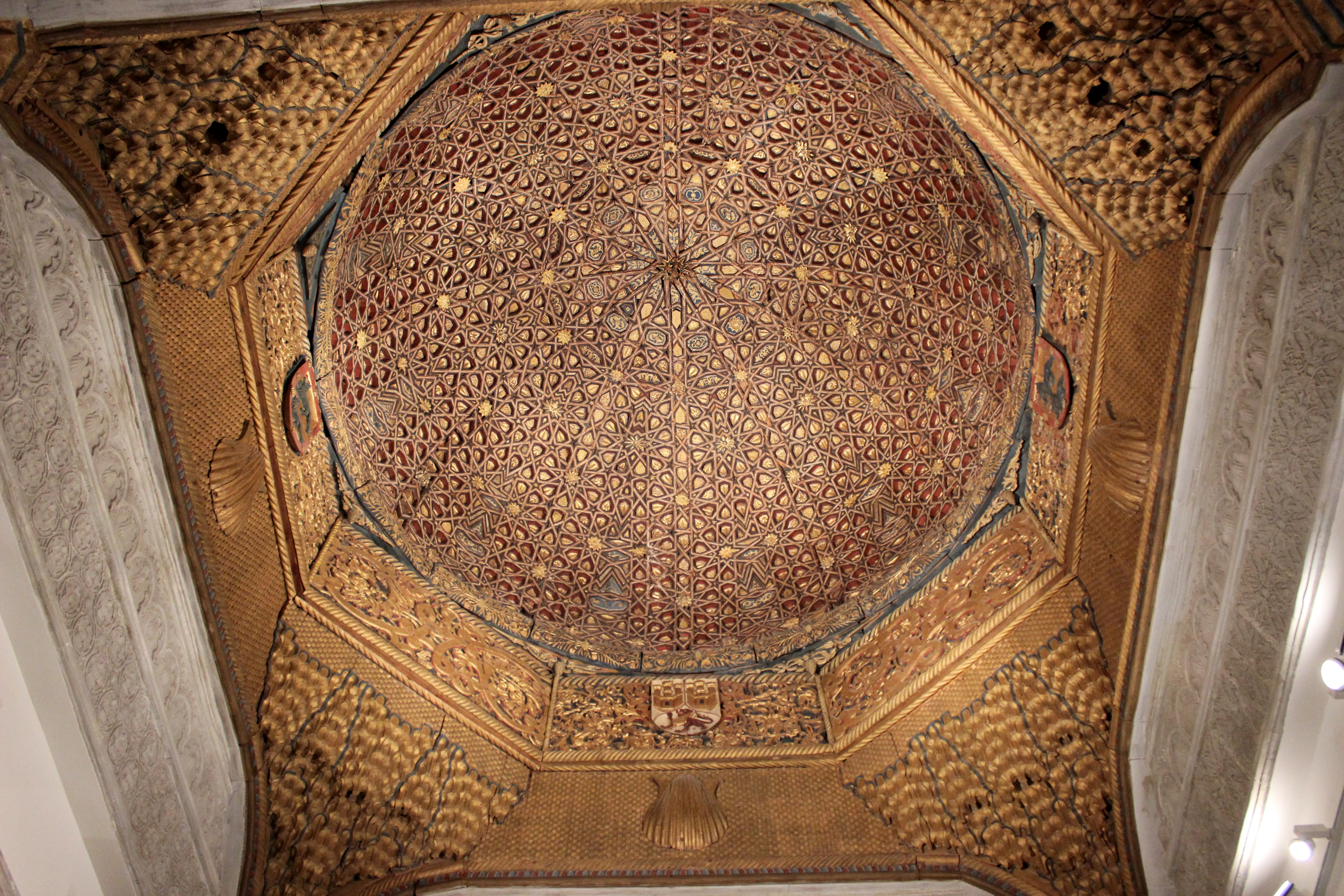
Coffered ceiling, located at the National Archaeological Museum in Madrid.

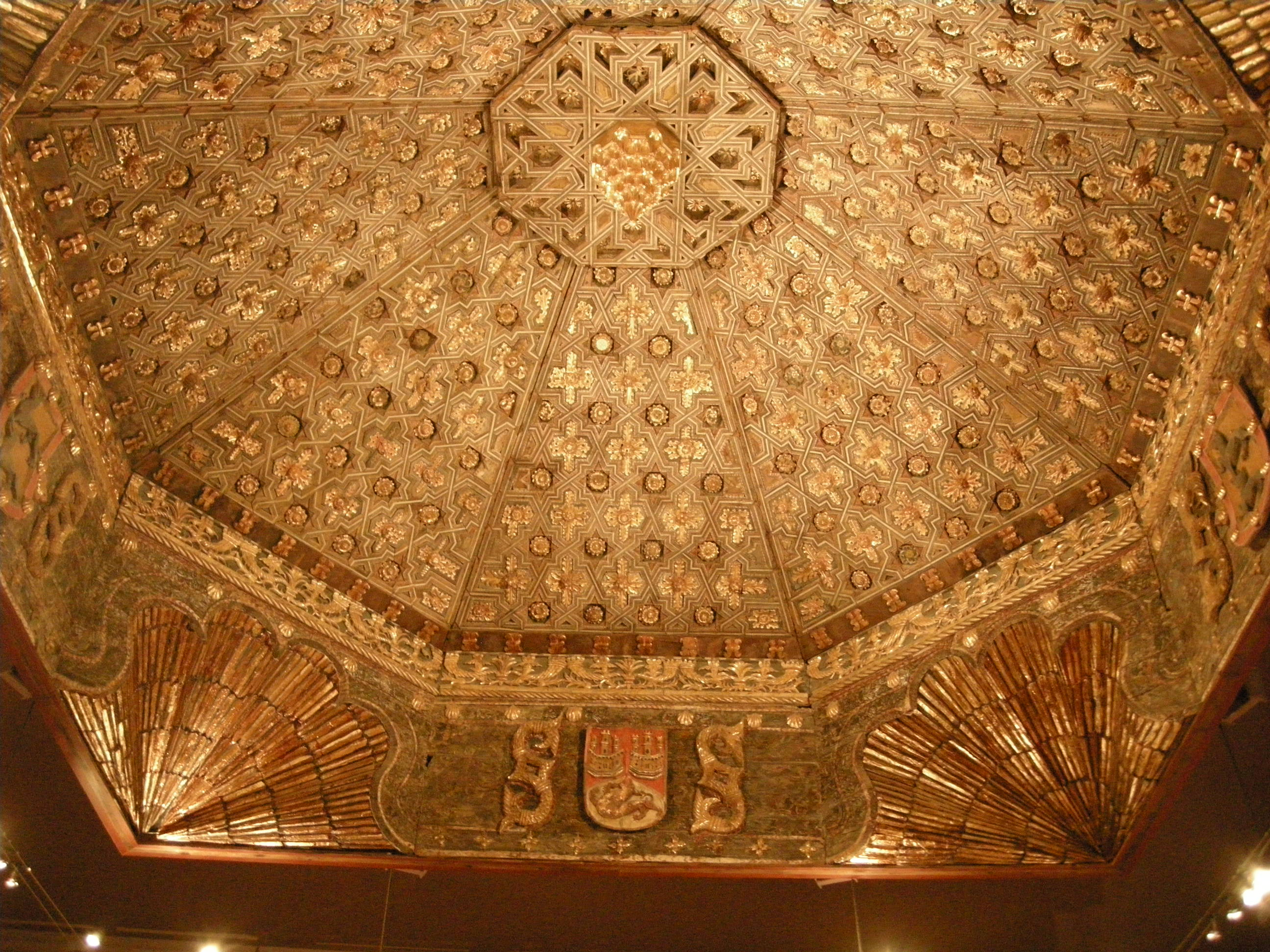
Coffered ceiling, located at the Legion of Honor Museum, in California.
