= Josep Pascó i Mensa =

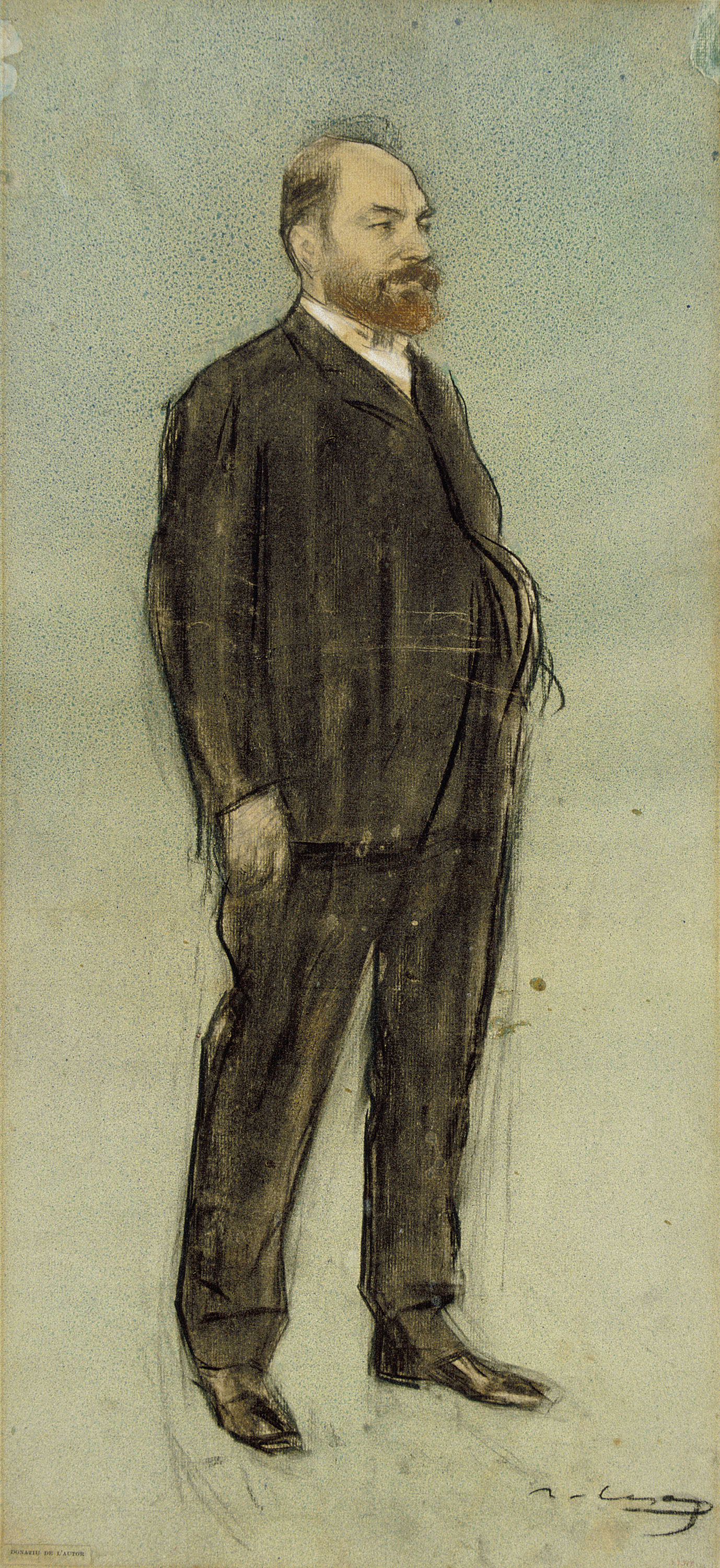
Josep Pascó, seen by Ramon Casas (MNAC).

Josep Pascó i Mensa (Catalan pronunciation: [ʒuˈzɛp pəsˈko]) (1855–1910), was a painter, illustrator and designer from Catalonia, an autonomous community of Spain, mostly noted for book illustrations and theater set design. He was born in Sant Feliu de Llobregat in 1855 and died in Barcelona in 1910. He trained as a painter at the Escola de la Llotja with Simó Gómez and at the workshop of designer Josep Planella. He began his career as a mural painter but then switched to canvas, mostly landscapes. One of his most original paintings is that of the flag of the Cau Ferrat in Sitges.

His most distinguished work is in the illustration of books and the design of decorative objects, as well as the design of theater sets, starting early with those for small amateur theater companies.

In 1887, he went to Madrid, where he worked at the Royal Theater and was then commissioned to decorate the Principe Alfonso Theater stage. In 1896 he went to Mexico to paint the scenery of the National Theater (since replaced by the Palacio de Bellas Artes). When he returned to Spain, he decided to focus on theater lighting. He also worked on the decoration of the home of Ramon Casas i Carbó in Barcelona.

Pascó's illustration work was mostly devoted to magazines such as Arte y Letras (Arts and Letters) and La Ilustració catalana (Catalan Illustration), done under the pseudonym of Brisa. He also produced a number of very notable illustration for scrolls.

Pascó later became a professor at the College of Arts and Industries in Barcelona, and the artistic director of the journal Hispania. Whilst he was at College of Arts and Industries in Barcelona he worked with Modest Urgell and he taught the young Joan Miró before he died in 1910.

== Bibliography ==
- DDAA (1992). La col·lecció Raimon Casellas. Publicacions del Mnac/ Museo del Prado. ISBN 84-87317-21-9. "Catàleg de l'exposició del mateix títol que es va dur a terme al Palau Nacional de Montjuïc entre el 28 de juliol i el 20 de setembre de 1992"
- MAS i PEINADO, Ricard: Els artistes catalans i la publicitat (1888-1929). Parsifal Edicions, Barcelona, 2002. ISBN 84-95554-16-X, page 12.
