= Holocaust Memorial at California Palace of the Legion of Honor =

Holocaust memorial by George Segal in San Francisco, California, U.S.

Coordinates: 37°47′04″N 122°30′03″W

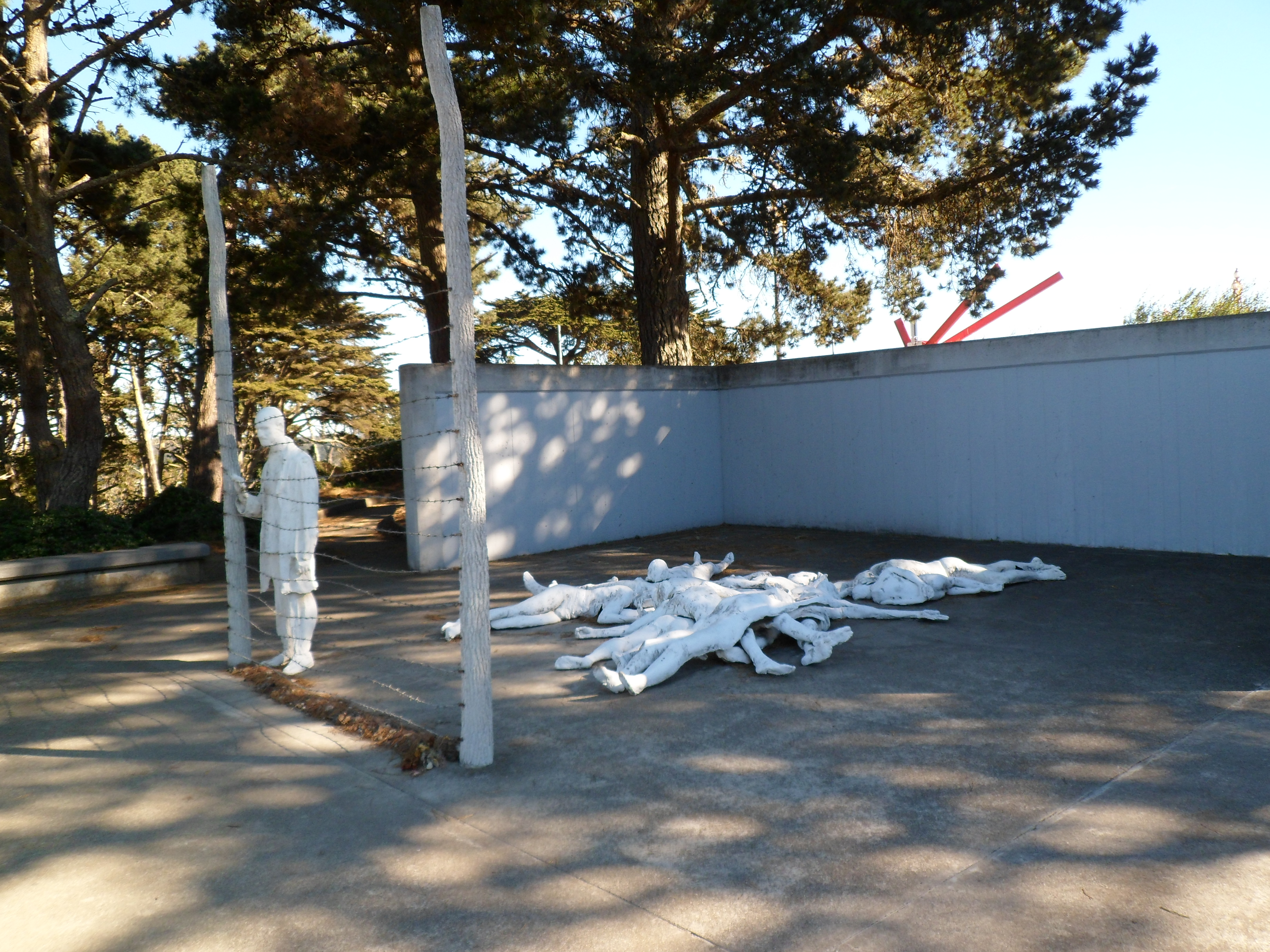
Holocaust Memorial at California Palace of the Legion of Honor

The Holocaust Memorial at California Palace of the Legion of Honor is a Holocaust memorial in San Francisco, California, in Lincoln Park, overlooking the Golden Gate. It was created by artist George Segal out of white painted bronze. In 1981, the city invited Segal to submit a design for its competition; his plaster maquette is held by the Jewish Museum in New York. The bronze cast was installed in 1984.

== Symbolism ==
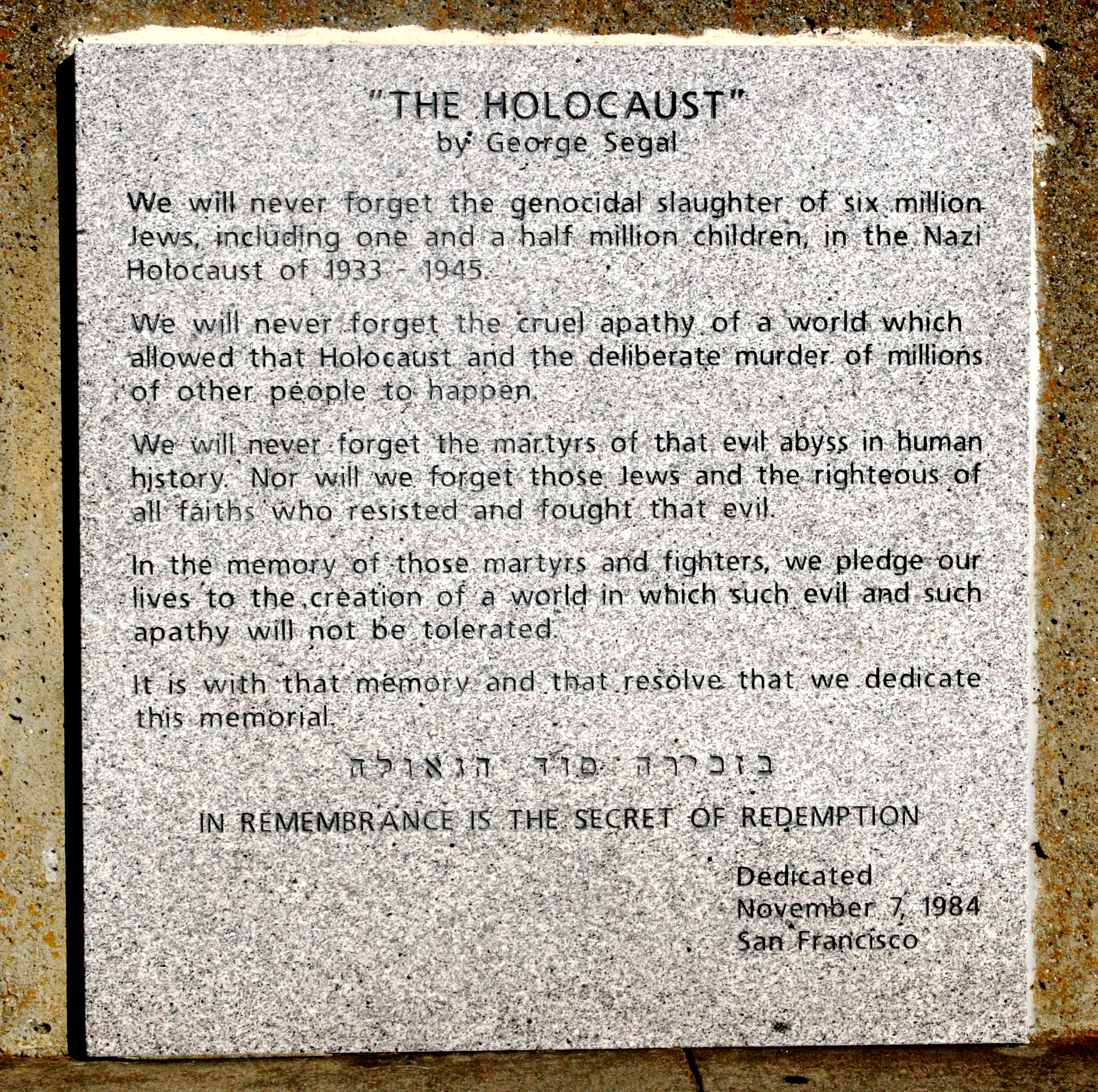
Holocaust Memorial plaque

Several of the bodies in the sculpture were designed to be symbolic. One of the bodies resembles Jesus, another is of a woman holding an apple, evoking Eve. Both symbolize the connection between Jews and Christians. The only standing man, a survivor, is thought to be the sculptor's representation of Margaret Bourke-White's famous Life Magazine 1945 photograph of the liberation of Buchenwald. Segal's friends posed for the casts, so they are not emaciated like the corpses found at the liberation of Buchenwald. This was an intentional choice by Segal, as was the star formation of the corpses.

== Vandalism ==
The memorial has been vandalized several times. The most common types of vandalism of the memorial are both the graffitiing of swastikas and the splashing of red paint. Segal perceives the vandalism as a reminder of the continued existence of antisemitism.
