= Bretteville =

Bretteville may refer to:

== Places ==
- in the Manche département, France:
  - Bretteville, Manche
  - Bretteville-sur-Ay
- in the Calvados département, France:
  - Bretteville-sur-Dives
  - Bretteville-sur-Laize
  - Bretteville-sur-Odon
  - Bretteville-le-Rabet
  - Bretteville-l'Orgueilleuse
- in the Seine-Maritime département, France:
  - Bretteville-du-Grand-Caux
  - Bretteville-Saint-Laurent
  - Varneville-Bretteville

== People ==
- Bretteville family
- Alma de Bretteville Spreckels (1881–1968), an American socialite and philanthropist
- Charles de Bretteville (1913–1992), an American business executive and banker
- Christian Zetlitz Bretteville (1800–1871), a Norwegian politician
- Sheila Levrant de Bretteville (living), an American graphic designer, artist and educator
