= Spreckels (surname) =

Spreckels is a German surname, most notably associated with the German-American Spreckels family. Related names include Spreckelsen, Sprekelsen, and Spreckens, often preceded by the German participle von.

Notable people with the surname Spreckels include:

- Adolph B. Spreckels, entrepreneur and philanthropist, son of Claus Spreckels
- Alma de Bretteville Spreckels, socialite, philanthropist, and wife of Adolph B. Spreckels
- Bunker Spreckels (born Adolph B. Spreckels III), surfer, grandson of Adolph B. Spreckels
- Claus Spreckels, industrialist, founder of the Spreckels Sugar Company and other enterprises, and of Spreckels dynasty
- Elisabeth Meyer-Spreckels, chemist, politician, founding member of the Christian Social Union in Bavaria, grand-niece of Claus Spreckels
- John D. Spreckels, entrepreneur, son of Claus Spreckels
- Judy Spreckels, writer, publisher, trial historian and friend of Elvis Presley. Ex-wife of Adolph B. Spreckels II.
- Kay Williams, Spreckels by her second marriage, American actress
- Rudolph Spreckels, businessman and social reformer, son of Claus Spreckels

== See also ==
- Spreckels (disambiguation)
