= Battle for Hill 140 =

1944 battle as part of Operation Totalize

- Part of the Battle of Normandy (Operation Totalize)
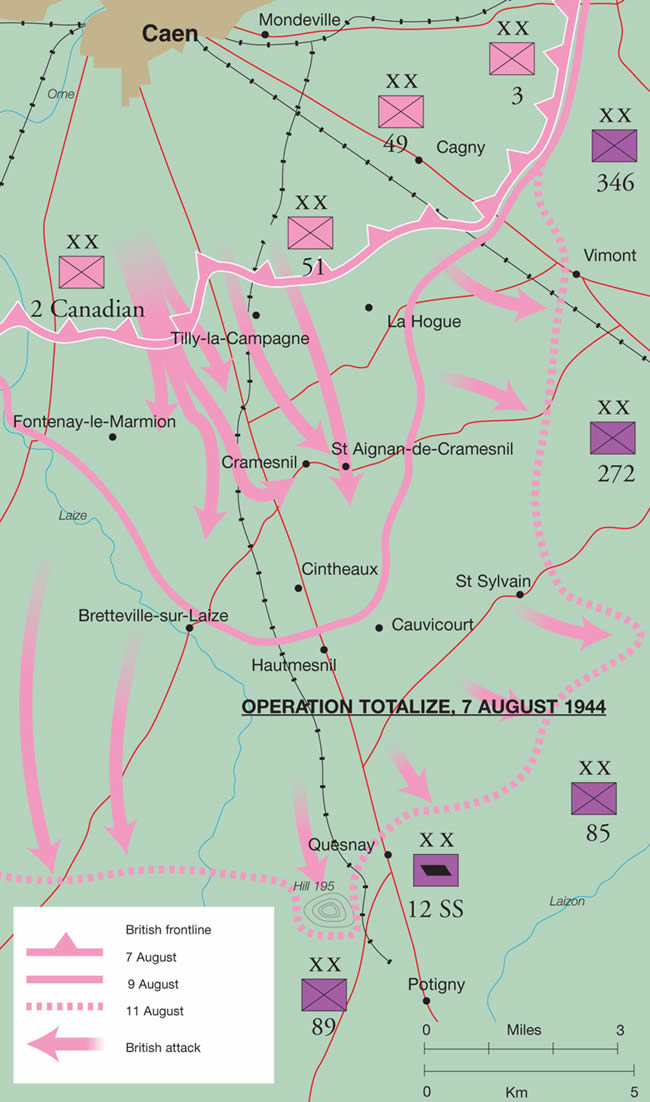
- Map of Operation Totalize
Date	August 9, 1944
Location	near Estrées-la-Campagne in Normandy, France 49°0′47.7″N 0°12′3.11″W
Result	German victory

Belligerents
Canada	(Nazi Germany) Germany

Commanders and leaders
Don Worthington †	Max Wünsche

Units involved
Worthington Combat Group	Kampfgruppe Wünsche and reinforcements

Casualties and losses
232 men 47 tanks and many other vehicles	Unknown; according to Canadians – high, according to Germans – insignificant

The Battle for Hill 140 (Note: The name entrenched in Canadian historiography. The battle took place 1.2 km northeast of Hill 140, closer to Hill 111 (hence sometimes also referred to as the "battle for Hill 111"). Fields of Fire: Canadians in Normandy (2004, p. 208); Tank Tactics: From Normandy to Lorraine (2001, p. 178)) was fought on 9 August 1944 as part of Operation Totalize between a battle group from the 4th Canadian Division and German troops, mainly from the 12th SS Panzer Division "Hitlerjugend". It occurred several miles east of the village of Estrées-la-Campagne, when, during a night attack, the Canadian troops strayed east from the axis of advance, occupying the wrong area on a forward slope. The consequence of the mistake was the destruction of the Canadian combat group by a German counterattack that lasted several hours. It was an unprecedented case during the Normandy campaign and probably the entire World War II, for such a large force to lose track of the terrain, lose its way and consequently be completely wrecked.

== Background ==
The attack of the II Canadian Corps south of Caen, codenamed "Totalize", began on the night of August 7–8. The plan, prepared by the corps commander, Maj. Gen. Guy Simonds, envisaged that Allied units would penetrate German defensive lines to a depth of 20 km and swiftly seize the hills directly north of the town of Falaise. In reality, the advance progressed at a very slow pace, with the two armored divisions expected to play a major role – 4th Canadian Division (4th AD) and Polish 1st Armoured Division (1st AD) – making only small gains throughout August 8, suffering heavy casualties in men and equipment. The Canadians advanced just over 2 km, reaching Cintheaux, while the Poles were halted at their starting positions near Cramesnil.

In the evening of August 8, Simonds ordered his armored divisions to resume the attack the next day. The 1st AD (commanded by Brigadier General Stanisław Maczek) was tasked with capturing the village of Cauvicourt and the Hill 140, located 5 km to the south, from which the crossings on the Laison river could be controlled. Meanwhile, acting to the right of the Poles, the 4th AD (commanded by Major General George Kitching) was to advance along the Caen–Falaise road (Route Nationale 158) and capture another key terrain feature – Hill 195. According to the corps commander's order issued in the evening, both divisions were to set out during the night and launch the attack at dawn.

Kitching entrusted the capture of Hill 195 to the 4th Canadian Armoured Brigade. In order to accomplish this task, its commander, Brigadier Eric Booth, reorganized his forces into two tactical groups, named after the commanding officers, known as Halpenny Force and Worthington Force. The former was to capture the village of Bretteville-le-Rabet, while the latter, moving along the Caen–Falaise road, was to strike at Hill 195 located 6 km further south, seize and hold it until reinforcements arrived.

== Units of both sides ==
The Worthington Force consisted of the 28th Armoured Regiment "British Columbia" (commanded by Lieutenant Colonel Donald "Don" Worthington), whose core comprised three squadrons of Sherman tanks, as well as three infantry companies from the "Algonquin" Regiment on M2 half-track armored cars (commanded by Lieutenant Colonel A.J. Hay). (Note: "Regiments" of the British Commonwealth countries bore this name only because of tradition, not the actual strength of the units; in fact, they corresponded to American or German battalions. (No Holding Back. Operation Totalize, Normandy, August 1944 (2009, p. XVII)).) At 31 years old, Worthington was the youngest regimental commander in the 4th AD, but he enjoyed the trust of Kitching, who considered him one of his best officers. The forces entrusted to him were rested but inexperienced. They did not participate in the fighting on August 8; the attack on Hill 195 was to be their baptism of fire.

The opponent of the armored divisions of the II Canadian Corps was the 12th SS Panzer Division "Hitlerjugend", which had been fighting in Normandy for over two months (commanded by SS-Brigadeführer Kurt Meyer), supported by elements of the shattered 89th Infantry Division from the first phase of Operation Totalize. Meyer divided his forces into four kampfgruppen. Defending the area of Hill 195, the target of Worthington's attack, was Kampfgruppe Olboeter (reinforced III Battalion of the 26th SS Panzergrenadier Regiment). To its right, in the Quesnay forest, was Kampfgruppe Wünsche (remnants of the 12th SS Panzer Regiment, reinforced by Tiger tanks from the 102nd SS Heavy Tank Battalion). Engaged in combat against the Poles near Cramesnil was Kampfgruppe Waldmüller (reinforced I Battalion of the 25th SS Panzergrenadier Regiment). Facing the risk of being outflanked, Meyer ordered Waldmüller to withdraw to the area of Hill 140 on the night of August 8–9. Further east, near Rouvres, was Kampfgruppe Krause (reinforced I Battalion of the 26th SS Panzergrenadier Regiment).

Although the 12th SS Panzer Division lost over 20 of its approximately 50 operational tanks on August 8, and the combat strength of the 89th Infantry Division, which bore the brunt of the Allied attack, was reduced by over half, Meyer largely managed to conduct a coordinated retreat and restore defensive lines based on the Quesnay forest. Additionally, reinforcements were hastening to his aid in the form of the 85th Infantry Division. Nevertheless, the intelligence of the II Canadian Corps downplayed the enemy's combat capability and overestimated the losses inflicted upon them. As a result, Worthington expected to encounter only "a few minor German formations" on his path.

== Course of battle ==
=== The Attack on Hill 195 ===
Booth issued the order to attack around midnight. His intention was for Worthington's group to set out as quickly as possible and, utilizing the element of surprise, seize Hill 195 with the break of dawn. Around 1:30 A.M., Worthington gathered his officers and conducted a short briefing during which he outlined the objective and the method of attack:

The enemy is disorganized. Command wants to exploit this and intends to continue the offensive (...). The brigadier wants to secure the terrain feature, Hill 195 (...). I intend to seize it and hold it until the rest of our forces can reach us. Execution – we will depart from our current position, then cross the road about 300 yards to the south from here, bypassing the positions of the "Lake Superior" Regiment, and then we will proceed south, staying on the eastern side of the road until we reach the target area. Then we will again cross the road and attack the hill from the southeast. Tanks will lead the way to the target. Keep advancing at all times; strive to reach the objective before dawn.

The departure took place from the area north of Cintheaux at 2:00 A.M. on August 9th. Tanks and transporters followed one another, and the cohesion of the long column moving in the darkness of the night depended on the drivers maintaining continuous visual contact with the vehicle in front of them. The initial stretch of the route proceeded without obstacles. According to the plan, the formation crossed Route Nationale 158, passed the positions of the "Lake Superior" Regiment preparing for the attack on Bretteville-le-Rabet, and then, sticking to the eastern side of the road, headed south. After covering about one mile, the first contact with the enemy was made when Squadron C, leading the way between Cintheaux and Cavicourt, engaged in a firefight with German infantry. Nevertheless, the attack continued to unfold.

Between 4 and 5 o'clock, the formation reached an area near Bretteville-le-Rabet, where the belated attack by Halpenny Force had just begun. Worthington faced a choice of whether to halt and wait until the town was cleared or to deviate from the route, bypass the village with a wide arc from the east, and continue the attack. He opted for the latter, wanting to exploit the element of surprise that was still on the side of the Canadians.

=== Losing the way ===
Worthington's decision, as it later turned out, had tragic consequences. The battle group indeed veered east and bypassed Bretteville-le-Rabet, but instead of eventually turning west and returning to RN 158, for unknown reasons, they continued to move southeast along a secondary road known as Chemin Haussé. Furthermore, the approaching dawn and the associated improvement in visibility caused the leading tanks to increase their speed, resulting in the column becoming fragmented and partially dispersed.

At the forefront still was Squadron C along with the regimental command tanks with Worthington and Hay. Following them at some distance was Squadron B. As it passed an unidentified village (most likely Estrées-la-Campagne), its commander, Major Carson, was the first to realize that the group had lost its way. Not only did he order his subunit to halt, but he also sent one of the platoons southwest, which, as it later turned out, was the correct direction. Confident in his decision, Worthington, however, ordered Carson over the radio to follow in his footsteps. In the meantime, Companies B and C of the "Algonquin" Regiment joined Squadron B. Squadron A and Company D were still far behind.

Around 6:40 A.M., completely unaware of the mistake, Worthington arrived at the foot of a hill, which he assumed to be Hill 195. He deployed his forces nearby, in a rectangular field bordered by a 1.5-meter-high hedge, shrubs and clumps of trees. In reality, however, it was the area between Hills 140 and 111, located 2 km southeast of Estrées-la-Campagne and over 6 km northeast of Hill 195.

Shortly afterward, Squadron B (without the 2nd platoon, which was heading towards the "real" Hill 195), Company C, and Company B also arrived there. The latter arrived without its 10th platoon, which had fallen behind and lost contact with the rest of the group. However, it was found and personally brought back by the company commander; as it turned out, the platoon had strayed from the road after detecting and destroying a position of two 88 mm guns, eliminating their 30-man crew in a bayonet charge.

At 6:50 A.M., Worthington reported to the command of the 4th Armoured Brigade via radio that he had occupied Hill 195: "No enemy, but evidence of their recent presence. Several destroyed trucks, trenches, and scattered tools. We will hold this position until our friends arrive and secure the area".

=== German reaction ===
The relative ease with which the Canadian battle group penetrated so deep behind enemy lines was not only due to the surprise caused by the night attack on the Germans. Above all, it was influenced by the fact that Kampfgruppe Waldmüller did not occupy the terrain around Hill 140, despite Meyer's orders, as it had not yet had time to regroup. Thus, the unexpected appearance of Worthington's forces there drove a wedge between the units of the 12th SS Panzer Division, threatened its headquarters (only 3 km away), and cut off the retreat route for Kampfgruppe Waldmüller. However, neither Worthington nor Booth and Kitching were aware of this, remaining under the mistaken belief that they had seized Hill 195.

In contrast to the Canadian command, the Germans quickly grasped the seriousness of the situation and took appropriate actions. Shortly after their appearance in the vicinity of Hill 140, Worthington's tanks were detected by SS-Obersturmführer Meitzel, a staff officer assigned to Kampfgruppe Wünsche. He immediately notified SS-Obersturmbannführer Max Wünsche, who passed on the information to Meyer, who in turn ordered the Canadians to be eliminated as quickly as possible. In response, Wünsche directed 15 Panther tanks from the 1st Battalion of the 12th SS Panzer Regiment and 5 Tiger tanks from the 102nd SS Heavy Tank Battalion, supported by at least two companies of panzergrenadier, against them from the area of Quesnay forest. Several surviving Tigers from the 101st SS Heavy Tank Battalion, which had fought the previous day as part of Kampfgruppe Waldmüller, also joined the fight.

=== Battle ===
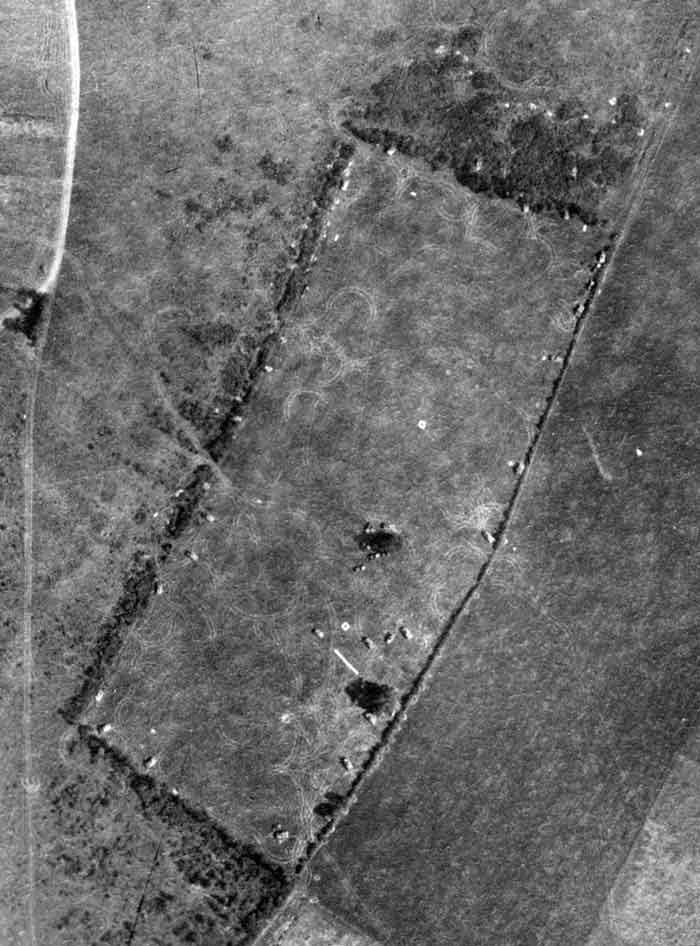
The aerial photograph shows the position occupied by the Worthington Force taken on the morning of August 9 by the Royal Air Force. Canadian tanks and armored personnel carriers are visible in the image.

Worthington set out for battle at the head of a full armored regiment and three infantry companies. As a result of the column breaking up, he was left with only 31 Sherman tanks, 1 light Stuart tank, and approximately 220 infantry soldiers. Nevertheless, he decided to organize a circular defense of the occupied position and await reinforcements. The tanks were positioned just behind the hedge, along each side of the rectangular field. Infantry dug trenches in front of them. Inside the formation, two medium mortar sections took positions in bomb craters.

The Canadian lieutenant colonel still hoped that the remaining units of his battle group would join these rather modest forces. One of them, the 2nd platoon of Squadron B, continued its solitary march towards Hill 195. When it reached a distance of less than 2 km from the objective, it came under fire in the area of Hill 151 from anti-tank guns and, devoid of any support, turned back. Near Estrées-la-Campagne, it encountered and joined Squadron A and Company D advancing towards Hill 140. Shortly thereafter, just a kilometer before the hill, the column fell into an ambush set by Tiger tanks and anti-tank guns. Only two Shermans managed to break through to Worthington; the remaining 17 were destroyed in a short time. The annihilation of Squadron A and the 2nd platoon was witnessed by Company D, riding just behind them. Its soldiers attempted to come to the aid of the tank crews but were held back by intense machine gun, mortar, and artillery fire. Eventually, having lost at least two armored cars, they withdrew towards Bretteville-le-Rabet.

Around 8:00 A.M., fighting also erupted in the area of Hill 140, where Wünsche's tanks had already managed to reach. They attacked the Canadian positions mainly from two directions. From the southwest, a company of Panther tanks advanced, reinforced by a company of armored grenadiers. Meanwhile, from the southeast, two platoons of heavy Tiger tanks struck, accompanied by another company of armored grenadiers. Their actions were supported by intense mortar and heavy artillery fire.

The Canadians were particularly troubled by the shelling coming from a small forest located 700 meters to the south. Around 9:00 A.M., Worthington ordered two Shermans from Squadron B to reconnoiter it. They reached the forest without encountering any obstacles, but when they began to clear out the detected German firing positions, they were attacked and destroyed by a Tiger tank. Major Carson, leading two more Shermans, rushed to their aid, but they too were quickly eliminated. In the meantime, two surviving tanks from the shattered Squadron A arrived with the news that the Germans had already occupied the western and northern approaches, trapping Worthington's forces.

Meanwhile, Booth and Kitching attempted to ascertain the whereabouts of the battle group. Before 8:00 A.M., Worthington received orders from the brigade command to confirm the position they were holding. He reported being on Hill 195. In response to further calls at 8:49 A.M., he gave the same location, stating that they were under attack and needed artillery support. This was the last communication received from him by Booth – radio communication between the battle group and the brigade was severed. Shortly thereafter, Brigadier Lane, the artillery commander of the 4th AD, took off in his Auster aircraft. He failed to observe any Canadian presence on Hill 195. However, he must have seen dozens of tanks and other vehicles, many of them burning, between hills 140 and 111. Due to the fact that this area was within the 1st AD's sector of advance, he most likely assumed them to be Polish.

Kitching admitted after the war that he heard the sounds of fierce fighting on the left flank of his division but believed it was the Poles engaging the Germans. He suspected that the "British Columbia" and "Algonquin" regiments had reached their objective and found themselves further south, near Potigny. Consequently, the general called upon his last reserves and ordered the "Governor General's Foot Guard", led by the 21st Armoured Regiment, to go to Worthington's aid. However, they failed to even approach Hill 195 as they were repelled by accurate fire from 88 mm guns placed in the Quesnay forest, losing 26 tanks in the process.

Meanwhile, the situation of the Worthington Force continued to deteriorate steadily. Their immobile combat vehicles were systematically and with impunity destroyed from long distances by Panthers and Tigers. This was happening because the shells fired from the long-barreled guns of these tanks effectively penetrated the Shermans' armor from distances of almost 2000 meters, while the Sherman struggled to penetrate their frontal armor even from the closest range. (Note: Even the Sherman in the "Firefly" version, equipped with the British 17-pounder gun, couldn't penetrate the armor of a Tiger or Panther from a distance greater than 1000 meters. Moreover, there were few of them (only every fifth Sherman was equipped with this gun). No Holding Back. Operation Totalize, Normandy, August 1944 (2009, p. 375)) As a result, by around 10:00 A.M., more than half of the Canadian tanks were already destroyed. A little earlier, the first of many attacks by German infantry occurred that day. Approximately 200 armored grenadiers, supported by four tanks, advanced. The attack was repelled, and according to Canadian accounts, the Germans suffered heavy losses. However, the Canadian infantry also suffered increasingly serious casualties. Among the most severely wounded was the commander of the "Algonquin" Regiment, Lieutenant Colonel Hay. Shortly after repelling the initial counterattack, while discussing with Worthington the plan for further defense, an anti-tank shell hit the tank behind which they were both standing, and one of the fragments severed Hay's leg.

Due to the steadily increasing number of wounded, for whom assistance couldn't be provided in the battlefield conditions, Worthington agreed to evacuate them on 11 still operational armored cars under the command of Captain Lewis. Although clearly marked with red cross signs, one of them was destroyed. The remaining cars managed to safely reach the positions held by the 10th Canadian Infantry Brigade around 10:30 A.M. However, Lewis couldn't accurately determine the actual location of the battle, reporting that he arrived from Hill 195.

The only effective support provided to the surrounded units that day came from the Royal Air Force. Early in the morning, British Typhoons flew over Hill 140 and identified the Canadians. Then, almost until the end of the battle, they returned approximately every 30 minutes, attacking the advancing Germans and their artillery positions. Probably only with the help of these fighters, the Canadians were able to hold their position for so long, despite it being strategically compromised. On the other hand, although the air force knew the exact location of the Worthington group, this information was not communicated to Simonds or Kitching.

In the afternoon, Wünsche's forces were reinforced by the 1st company of the 12th SS Tank Destroyer Battalion (equipped with Jagdpanzer IV self-propelled guns) and units from the 85th Infantry Division. Around 2:00 P.M., they launched another counterattack on the Canadian positions, but it was broken up by the Typhoon airstrikes. At this point, Worthington had very few tanks left. Realizing the hopelessness of the situation, around 3:00 P.M., he ordered the evacuation of all remaining operational Shermans. Thanks to this, eight of them managed to break through to the Polish forces advancing from the north.

According to Canadian accounts, before 5:30 P.M. they made visual contact with a squadron of Polish Sherman tanks (which had previously accidentally fired on them). The squadron managed to reach a distance of just under 300 meters from Worthington's position, preventing another German counterattack, but when it soon came under heavy German fire, it was forced to withdraw.

In the evening, only remnants remained in the Canadian group, mainly decimated infantry platoons. Nevertheless, Colonel Worthington decided to fight to the end. Around 7:45 P.M. (according to other accounts, around 5:30 P.M.), he was killed by a mortar shell explosion. Command was taken over by the wounded Major MacPherson, commander of Company B, but when he too was killed shortly afterward, command passed to Major Monk, commander of Company C. Monk planned to hold out until dusk, and then attempt to withdraw. After 8:00 P.M., the Germans began to eliminate the Canadian positions, and some defenders began to flee. Around 10:00 P.M., the defensive lines were completely breached. Monk ordered a retreat, ending the battle. Taking advantage of the darkness, the surviving Canadians attempted to break through to the Allied lines individually or in small groups. Some of them only succeeded on August 12th.

== Aftermath ==
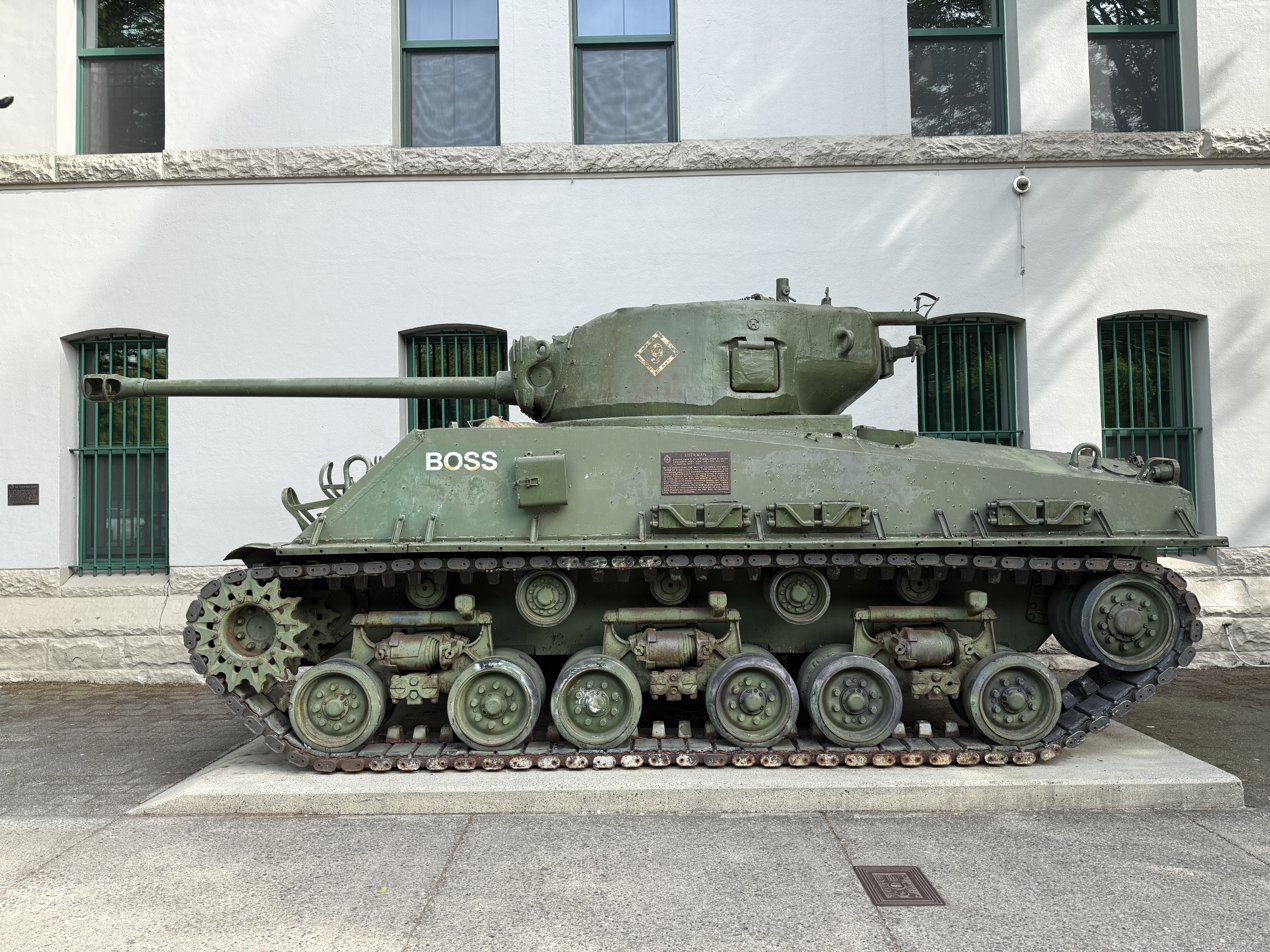
M4A2(76)W HVSS "Easy 8" painted to resemble LCol. Worthington's tank "Boss". At the Beatty Street Drill Hall, in Vancouver.

As a result of the battle, the Canadian battle group was almost completely destroyed. The total human losses amounted to at least 232 men. 28th CAR list total casualties for Aug 9th as 88 men. The "Algonquin" Regiment lost 36 killed, 30 wounded, and 52 missing, totaling 118 men, including the regiment's commander and one of the company commanders.

The German losses are not known. According to the commander of the "Hitlerjugend" division, Kurt Meyer, they were negligible, but the Canadians who participated in the battle assessed them as high, especially among the infantry.

According to some Canadian historians, Worthington's mistake could have unexpectedly changed the course of the entire battle of Falaise if it had been discovered promptly by the Canadian command. It created an opportunity to introduce additional units into the breakthrough and penetrate behind the lines of the I SS Panzer Corps. However, this opportunity was not seized, and the destruction of the Canadian formation enabled the Germans to resolve the crisis caused by the enemy tanks penetrating their rear and to restore the continuity of the defensive lines north of Falaise.

Hill 195 was occupied without resistance by the 4th AD early on the morning of August 10th. On the same day, the Polish 1st AD captured Estrées-la-Campagne and Hill 111. These gains, however, in view of the heavy losses suffered earlier, the loss of the element of surprise, and the strong German defense in the Quesnay forest, were not exploited. On August 11th, Simonds announced the end of Operation Totalize. Hill 140 was eventually taken by the Canadians on August 14th during the subsequent offensive of the II Canadian Corps – Operation Tractable.

Thanks to reinforcements, the "British Columbia" Regiment was quickly rebuilt and participated in later combat operations of their division. By the end of World War II, it recorded the highest losses of all Canadian armored regiments (335 men and 120 tanks). SS-Obersturmbannfuhrer Max Wünsche received the Oak Leaves to the Knight's Cross two days after the battle. Less than two weeks later, his kampfgruppe was destroyed in Falaise, and he himself soon fell into Allied captivity.

A monument located near the battlefield, on Hill 111 (along road D 131, between Estrées-la-Campagne and Maizières), commemorates the fallen soldiers of the "British Columbia" and "Algonquin" Regiments. They were buried at the Canadian War Cemetery in Bretteville-sur-Laize. In 1956, in honor of Lieutenant Colonel Don Worthington, one of the peaks in the Continental Ranges was named Mount Worthington.

== Controversies ==
The unfortunate course of the attack by Worthington Force and its subsequent destruction have been the subject of investigation by Canadian historians and military theorists. Controversy has particularly arisen over three issues: the reason for the group losing its way, the inability to determine its location and provide assistance by the Canadian command, and the stance of the Polish 1st Armored Division.

=== Losing the way ===
The direct cause of Worthington's tragic mistake was never conclusively determined. According to historians, several factors contributed to it. Among the most likely factors cited are: the stress and excitement associated with entering combat; the haste with which the group moved, wanting to reach its objective before dawn; the common mistake made by soldiers of forcibly matching the terrain to the map; lack of training in night maneuvers; terrain lacking distinctive landmarks; morning fog and dust clouds emanating from the vehicle tracks, further impairing visibility. An analysis of aerial photographs taken during the battle by the Royal Air Force in 2010 allowed for the exact route of the group to be reconstructed. Based on this, Canadian historian Mike Bechthold argues that Worthington, disoriented upon encountering Chemin Haussé, mistook it for the equally wide and straight Route Nationale 158, which may have been reinforced by the similarity of the forests and hills near both roads.

=== Attitude of the Canadian command ===
Despite the severed direct communication with the brigade headquarters, Worthington's forces did not find themselves in complete isolation, and various Allied units established contact with them during the battle. Primarily, this was the tactical aircraft of the Royal Air Force, which knew the exact position of the battle group and provided support throughout the day. Around noon, the Canadians also received artillery support, which may indicate that at least one of the three artillery observers assigned to Worthington knew the actual location of the group. The burning tanks of Worthington were also seen by a British artillery observer from his advanced position near the Quesnay forest, but like Brigadier Lane, he mistook them for Polish and did not notify anyone about it. Until 3:00 P.M., the supply officer of the "British Columbia" Regiment remained in constant radio contact with Worthington. He tried to inform the brigade headquarters about this, but could not establish a connection. Already before noon, signs of fighting near Hill 140 were seen by the Polish forces advancing in its direction. Moreover, around 3:00 P.M., the last 8 surviving Sherman tanks of Worthington broke through to them, and the Canadian liaison officer with the Polish 1st Armoured Division notified the staff of the 4th Canadian Division about this.

Nevertheless, the Canadian command could not determine the position of the battle group and provide any assistance until the evening. The blame for this is attributed to the faulty communication and control system in the Canadian army, as well as the lack of proper coordination between the 1st and 4th Armoured Divisions, and the lack of communication between Kitching's and Booth's staff and the British air force and artillery. Historian Brian A. Reid also points to serious flaws in the order to attack Hill 195, which assumed a night attack by units not trained for such actions, for whom this was their first combat action. Furthermore, he argues that the departure time set by Booth excluded the possibility of reaching the target before dawn. Following the planned route, the tanks of the 28th Armoured Regiment "British Columbia" would have had to pass by the positions of German artillery in the Quesnay forest in daylight, and they would likely have met the same fate as those from the 21st Armoured Regiment "Governor General's Foot Guard".

The author of the official history of Canadian Army operations, Colonel Prof. C.P. Stacey, summarized the battle as "a tragic mixture of bravery and incompetence". Lieutenant Colonel Dr. R.J. Jarymowycz, on the other hand, stated that "losing a tank regiment in the darkness of the night can be considered unfortunate, but losing an entire battle group in broad daylight is sheer negligence".

=== Attitude of 1st Armoured Division ===
Hill 140 was the objective of the Polish 1st Armoured Division from the beginning of Operation Totalize, yet neither on August 8th nor 9th did they manage to capture it. The actions of the Polish forces, especially on the second day, and above all their failure to aid Worthington, were critically assessed by some Canadians. General Kitching wrote: I do not know what went wrong with the Poles on those two days, August 8th and 9th, but they certainly were no help to us. I gave the Poles a very poor rating for this battle. If they had been as aggressive as Worthington, they could have been there to relieve the intense pressure on him. Meanwhile, General Simonds' aide-de-camp, Captain Stearns, stated that some Polish units turned back in the face of relatively weak enemy resistance. These and similar comments were reflected in Canadian literature regarding Operation Totalize. The main criticisms leveled at the Polish division concerned the late start of the attack, a lack of determination in its execution, and the withdrawal from Hill 111 despite establishing contact with Worthington's critically positioned group.

Despite Simonds' orders for both armored divisions to resume the attack overnight from August 8th to 9th, the 1st Armoured Division only began it on August 9th at 11:00 A.M. This was due to the fact that the prevailing British doctrine for armored operations, instilled in officers during training, did not envision the use of tanks at night, but rather mandated withdrawing them to secure positions (laager) before nightfall – which is exactly what the Polish and most Canadian armored regiments did. As military theorist Lieutenant Colonel Dr. J.A. English wrote, the actions of Worthington's battle group compared to the other units illustrated the depth of tactical schizophrenia afflicting the armored forces of the British and Canadian armies.

After regrouping in the morning, the Poles advanced towards Hill 140 with the forces of the 10th Armoured Cavalry Brigade. The 24th Uhlan Regiment, supported by the 10th Dragoon Regiment, struck at Estrées-la-Campagne, while Hill 140 itself was to be taken by the 1st Armoured Regiment (commanded by Major Aleksander Stefanowicz). Some Canadian historians suggest that Stefanowicz reached Hill 111 (and even Rouvres) by early afternoon, rescued some Canadians, and then withdrew without assisting the remaining forces of Worthington's group still in combat. However, according to other Canadian accounts, this occurred before 5:30 P.M. Criticisms were also leveled at the slow pace of the Polish regiment's advance, which was deemed too cautious, identifying any encountered German tanks and armored guns as Tigers. For these reasons, the Poles were accused of lacking aggression, and their determination to reach Hill 140 was questioned.

However, according to Polish sources, the 1st Armoured Regiment reached Cavicourt only in the early afternoon. Their further movement was significantly delayed due to engaging in combat with tanks from Kampfgruppe Waldmüller, which inexperienced Polish tankers indeed mistook for Tigers and in considerable numbers (10–15 vehicles) – although at this time, there probably wasn't a single tank of this type in the 1st Armoured Regiment's sector. By 4 P.M., the regiment had covered another 2 km and captured Hill 84, but the lack of support from their own infantry and strong German defense caused them to halt before Soignolles. To break the deadlock, the commander of one of the squadrons, Captain Bartosiński, proposed encircling Soignolles from the west, capturing Hill 111, and striking from there towards Hill 140. Major Stefanowicz accepted the idea and personally led the charge of two squadrons. The dynamic maneuver surprised the Germans, allowing the Poles to advance about 3 km and capture Hill 111, which was only a few hundred meters from the position held by the Canadian battle group. However, according to the regiment's officers, the attack was launched only after 8:30 P.M., when Worthington's forces were already defeated. Polish tankers found only wrecks of Shermans and around 100 Canadians in the area of Hill 111 – some of whom were rescued from German captivity. Shortly thereafter, due to the approaching darkness, lack of infantry support, the close presence of a strong enemy, and increasing losses, Major Stefanowicz ordered a retreat. The attack cost the 1st Armoured Regiment 15 tanks and 29 killed and wounded (including the deputy commander of the regiment, Major Mieczysław Malinowski, who was killed). Stefanowicz was awarded the Silver Cross of the Virtuti Militari for this action.

== See also ==
- Battle of Hill 262

== Bibliography ==
- Agte, Patrick (2006). Michael Wittmann and the Waffen SS Tiger commanders of the Leibstandarte in World War II. Volume II. Stackpole Books. ISBN 0811733351.
- Bechthold, Mike (2010). "Lost in Normandy. The Odyssey of Worthington Force, 9 August 1944". Canadian Military History. 19 (2): 5–24.
- Butler, Rupert (2009). SS-Hitlerjugend. Historia 12. Dywizji SS 1943–1945. Warsaw: Bellona. ISBN 978-83-11-11494-4.
- Copp, Terry (2004). Fields of Fire: Canadians in Normandy. Toronto: University of Toronto Press. ISBN 9780802037800.
- English, John Alan (1991). The Canadian Army and the Normandy campaign. New York: Praeger Publishers. ISBN 9780275930196.
- Jarymowycz, Roman J. (2001). Tank Tactics: From Normandy to Lorraine. Boulder: Lynne Rienner Publishers. ISBN 9781555879501.
- Jarymowycz, Roman J. (1998). "Canadian Armour in Normandy. Operation "Totalize" and the Quest for Operational Maneuver". Canadian Military History. 7 (2): 19–40.
- Kutzner, Jacek; Tym, Juiusz S. (2010). Polska 1. Dywizja Pancerna w Normandii. Warsaw: Oficyna Wydawnicza Rytm. ISBN 978-83-7399-404-1.
- Meyer, Hubert (2005). The 12th SS: The History of the Hitler Youth Panzer Division. Volume Two. Mechanicsburg: Stackpole Books. ISBN 978-0-8117-3199-7.
- Reid, Brian A. (2009). No Holding Back. Operation Totalize, Normandy, August 1944. Stackpole Books. ISBN 978-0-8117-0584-4.
- Stacey, C.P. (1960). Official History of The Canadian Army In The Second World War. Volume III. The Victory Campaign: The Operations In North-West Europe 1944–1945. Ottawa: The Queen's Printer And Controller of Stationery.
- Waite, Donald E. (2010). Vancouver Exposed – A History in Photographs. Vancouver: Waite Bird Photos. p. 199. ISBN 978-0-9866897-0-3.
