= Le Normand de Bretteville family =

Le Normand de Bretteville
- Nobility
- Coat of arms
- Country: France; Denmark; Norway
- Origin: Bretteville-le-Rabet
- Founded: 3 July 1593 (noble status)
- Founder: Jean Le Normand (first mention)
- Titles: Marquis; Lord of Bretteville; Lord of Trassepied; Lord of Bossy; Lord of Tertre
- Members: Louis Claude le Normand de Bretteville; Christian Zetlitz Bretteville; Alma de Bretteville Spreckels; Charles de Bretteville
- Connected families: Spreckels family

The Le Normand de Bretteville family is a French Norman and later Franco-Danish noble family. They later produced a Norwegian branch, as well as an American branch, the de Bretteville family.

== Origins ==
The family's original family name is Le Normand, but the family is sometimes known as only Bretteville in modern times, taking its name from its former lordship Bretteville-le-Rabet, a village in Normandy.

== History ==
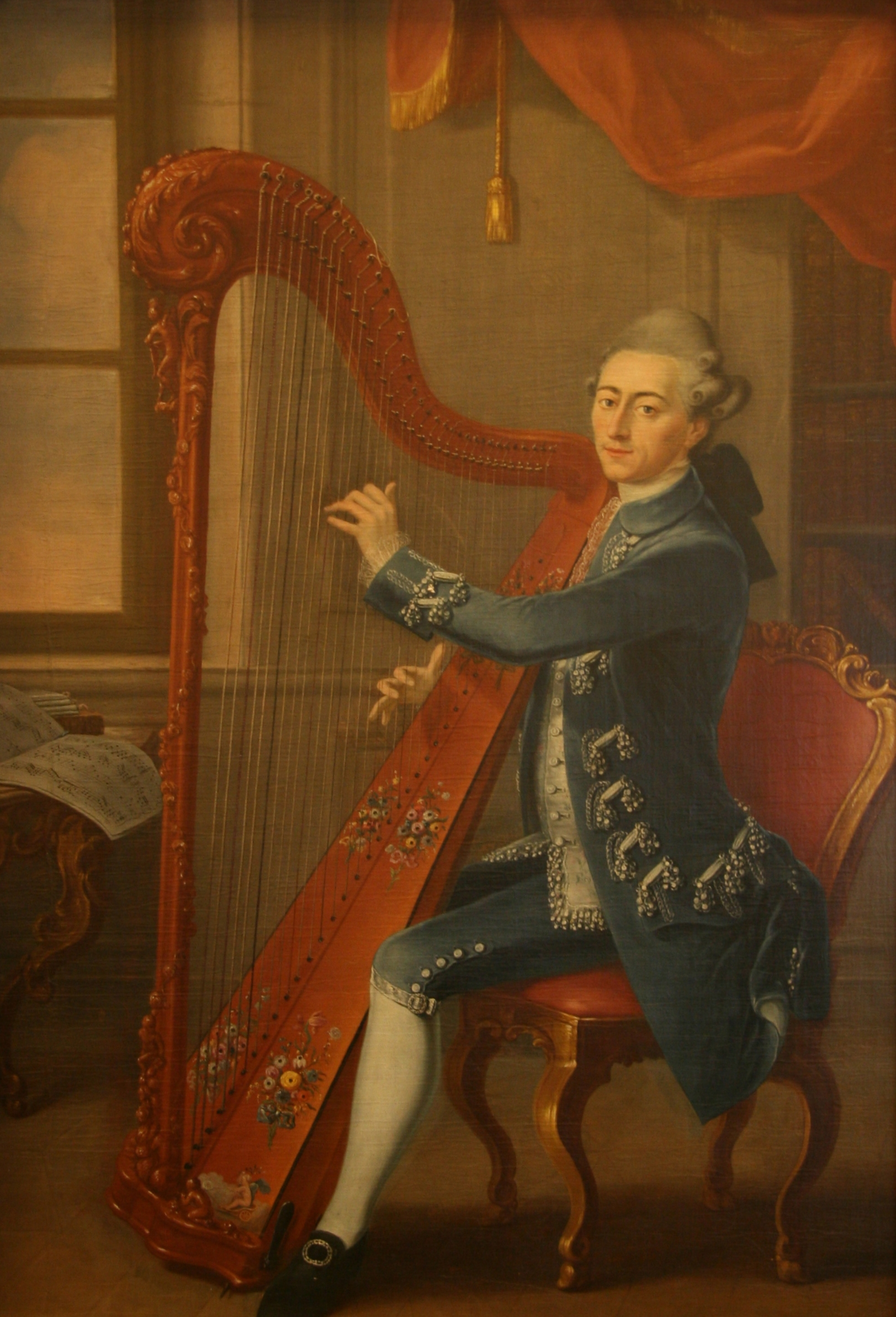
Louis-Claude Le Normand de Bretteville

The family originated in Normandy, where they were lords of Bretteville, Trassepied, Bossy and Tertre. The family is first mentioned in 1470 with the Norman knight Jean Le Normand. Its noble status was confirmed by Norman courts on 3 July 1593, 11 February 1603 and 23 March 1629, and by French royal authorities on 2 July 1605, 7 February 1641 and 1 January 1699. Jacques Le Normand contracted the lordship of Bretteville in 1636 and the lordship was permanently ceded to the family in 1679.

=== Danish and Norwegian branch ===
Marquis Louis Claude le Normand de Bretteville (1744–1835) left France during the French Revolution, becoming a Danish Major-General and naturalized as a Dano-Norwegian nobleman in 1804. He was married to Catherine-Thérèse Vedastine van den Driesch and had several descendants in Denmark and Norway. Louis Claude's daughter Louise-Joséphine was a lady-in-waiting to Princess Wilhelmina Caroline of Denmark. His third son, Charles Eugène (1782–1854), moved to Norway in 1799, and was the father of Prime Minister Christian Zetlitz Bretteville (1800–1871). Christian Bretteville's great-grandson was Norwegian footballer Jean-Louis Bretteville (1905–1956).

=== American branch ===
The American branch was derived from the Danish one. A great-grandson of Louis Claude, Oscar Viggo de Bretteville (1840–1922; born Oskar Harald Viggo Emil le Normand de Bretteville, and went by Viggo as a given name), emigrated to the United States in 1866, settling in San Francisco. In spite of his noble lineage, he arrived in the US quite poor, and the de Bretteville family continued to live under modest circumstances for many years.

The family's fortunes changed when Viggo's daughter Alma de Bretteville (1881–1968) married into the wealthy and influential Spreckels family, and in 1908 wed Adolph B. Spreckels, the second son of sugar magnate Claus Spreckels and an owner of many of the elderly Spreckels business interests. Alma de Bretteville Spreckels went on to become a leading art patron, philanthropist, and socialite in San Francisco, and played a leading role in founding the art museum, the California Palace of the Legion of Honor in 1924. She was later nicknamed "The Great Grandmother of San Francisco".

Other members of the de Bretteville family benefited from Alma's rise to prominence. Her brother Alexander de Bretteville (1877–1965) acted as her personal financial manager and served as an executive with the Spreckels Sugar Company and other family enterprises. His son Charles de Bretteville (1913–1992) took over as leader of the Spreckels companies starting in the late 1940s, and served as president of Spreckels Sugar Company from 1951 to 1962, and next served as a top executive of the Bank of California for another two decades.

One of Charles de Bretteville's sons is noted architect and Yale School of Architecture professor Peter de Bretteville. He is married to artist Sheila Levrant de Bretteville.
