= Worthington Combat Group =

- Active: 7 August 1944 – 9 August 1944
- Country: Canada
- Type: Battlegroup
- Role: Mechanized Infantry
- Engagements: World War II: Operation Totalize; Battle for Hill 140

Commanders
- Notable commanders: Lieutenant Colonel Donald Worthington †

The Worthington Combat Group, also known as Worthington Force, was a Canadian Battlegroup that was formed during the Second World War.

== History ==
The Worthington Combat Group was formed in August 1944 during Operation Totalize after Brigadier Eric Booth reorganized his forces into two battlegroups which were then named after their commanding officers. On 8 August 1944, Booth ordered the Worthington Combat Group to attack at midnight in order to use the element of surprise to capture Hill 195 before dawn. By 4 or 5 AM, Worthington Force had reached an area near Bretteville-le-Rabet, where the belated attack by Halpenny Force had just begun. Donald Worthington, the commander of the Worthington Combat Group, faced a choice of whether to halt and wait until the town was cleared or to deviate from the route, bypass the village with a wide arc from the east and continue the attack. Worthington opted for the latter with the intention of keeping the element of surprise and to avoid German guns in the village. Due to the early morning fog and dust raised by the tanks, visibility was poor and the Battlegroup had unknowingly become lost. At 6:40 AM, Worthington arrived at the foot of a Hill which he assumed to be Hill 195 and reported his assumed position to the command of the 4th Armoured Brigade ten minutes late. However, this was actually the area between Hill 140 and Hill 111 which was located over 6 kilometres away from Hill 195. German forces, realizing that a Canadian force had penetrated their line, Max Wünsche lead his troops into battle with orders to eliminate all Canadian forces as quickly as possible. In the following battle, the Worthington Combat Group was wiped out. Worthington himself decided to fight to end and was killed by a mortar shell. Surviving members of the battlegroup which was now under the command of Major Monk, managed to breakout in small groups under the cover of night and reach allied lines with the last stranglers reaching allied lines on 12 August 1944.

== Structure ==
- Worthington Combat Group
  - Algonquin Regiment
  - 28th Armoured Regiment (The British Columbia Regiment)

== Legacy ==
There is a memorial to the Worthington Force in the commune of Rouvres in Calvados.
