= Spreckels =

Spreckels may refer to:

- Spreckels family, a German-American business family
- Spreckels (surname), a family name; includes list of people with the surname.
- Spreckels Sugar Company (including Spreckels Sugar brand), defunct beet sugar company, founded by Claus Spreckels

== Places ==
- Spreckels, California, former company town of the Spreckels Sugar Company
- Spreckels Lake, San Francisco, an artificial lake in Golden Gate Park
- Spreckelsville, Hawaii, a former company town on the island of Maui

== Buildings ==
- Spreckels Building (San Francisco), also known as San Francisco Call Building and later Central Tower
- Spreckels Building (Los Angeles), designated a Los Angeles Historic-Cultural Monument
- Spreckels Mansion (San Francisco), a mansion built in Pacific Heights, for Adolph B. and Alma Spreckels
- Spreckels Mansion (San Diego), a mansion in Coronado, California, built for John D. Spreckels
- Spreckels Theatre, built in San Diego, California in 1912

== Other uses ==
- Spreckels Organ, San Francisco, donated by Adolph B. Spreckels, at the Legion of Honor museum
- Spreckels Organ Pavilion, San Diego, donated by Adolph B. and John D. Spreckels

== See also ==
- Spreckelsen
