= Spreckelsen (surname) =

North German surname and surname group

Spreckelsen is a German surname found primarily in northern Germany. The name group includes the variants Sprekelsen and Spreckels, often preceded by the German name particle von. Genealogical scholars generally regard it as a toponymic surname, likely derived from Spreckens, a town in Lower Saxony. A 2009 genetic study found that the surname arose independently in multiple unrelated family lines, supporting this interpretation. The surnames von Spreckelsen and Spreckels have been borne by several notable families across northern Europe and North America.

== Geography ==
The name and its variants originated in northern Germany and are found most commonly in the German states (Länder) of Lower Saxony, Bremen, Hamburg, and Schleswig-Holstein.

== Etymology ==
Most genealogical scholars state that the surname is derived from Spreckens, a town now in the municipality of Bremervörde in Lower Saxony. Alternatively, it may have been derived from Spreckel, a village in the municipality of Wetschen, also in Lower Saxony. Although the suffix -sen (son) is often patronymic in German surnames, the Deutscher Familiennamenatlas argues that, in this case, -sen is actually a shortening of -hausen (house), a common pattern seen in several other surnames from this region.

== Notable families ==
Spreckelsen and its variants have been the surname of several notable families in distinct family lines of northern German origin. The von Spreckelsen family was historically a leading patrician and merchant family of the Free Imperial City of Hamburg from the 15th through the 18th centuries. Three mayors, seven senators (Ratsherren), and numerous other civic officials of the city-state came from this family. The earliest known ancestor of the family was Hartig von Spreckelsen, who came to Hamburg from the territory of the Prince-Archbishopric of Bremen in about 1400.

The Spreckels family was a German-American business dynasty, founded by Claus Spreckels (1828–1908), who came from a smallholder farming family in Lamstedt in the Kingdom of Hanover (now in Lower Saxony) and emigrated to the United States in 1848. Through the 19th and 20th centuries, Claus Spreckels and his descendants were a powerful force in sugar production, shipping, railroads, and other enterprises in California and Hawaii.

A Danish line was established by migrants from Dithmarschen in Schleswig-Holstein prior to about 1600. Architect Johan Otto von Spreckelsen (1929–1987) came from this family.

== Genetic study ==
A 2009 Y-STR study tested 15 males from a genealogical source tracing the Spreckelsen name to the 14th century, representing 12 lineages of a pedigree of over 4,000 individuals. The study identified four distinct haplotype groups, at least two of which are clearly unrelated, concluding that bearers of the name do not descend from a single common patrilineal ancestor. The study concluded that the combination of genetic and historical evidence supports the interpretation of Spreckelsen as a toponymic surname that arose independently across multiple family lines.

== See also ==
For lists of individuals with this name and its variants, see:

- Spreckelsen
- Spreckels
