= FSV Frankfurt =

German association football club

- Full name: Fußballsportverein Frankfurt 1899 e.V.
- Nickname: Bornheimer/Die Schwarzen Teufel
- Founded: 20 August 1899; 127 years ago
- Ground: PSD Bank Arena
- Capacity: 12,542
- Chairman: Patrick Spengler
- Manager: Victor Kleinhenz
- League: Regionalliga Südwest (IV)
- 2025–26: Regionalliga Südwest, 3rd of 18
- Website: www.fsv-frankfurt.de
Home colours	Away colours	Third colours

Fußballsportverein Frankfurt 1899 e.V., commonly known as simply FSV Frankfurt and known as simply Frankfurt, is a German association football club based in the Bornheim district of Frankfurt am Main, Hessen and founded in 1899. FSV Frankfurt formerly fielded a rather successful women's team, which was disbanded in 2006.

== History ==
The club was one of the founding members of the Nordkreis-Liga in 1909, when football started to become more organised in Southern Germany. With the outbreak of the First World War in 1914, this league came to a halt but a championship for the region was still held, which FSV won in 1917.

After the war, the club became part of the Kreisliga Nordmain, which it managed to win in 1922–23, qualifying for the Southern German championship, where it finished last out of five teams.

The pinnacle of the team's achievement was a losing appearance in the 1925 national final, 0–1 to 1. FC Nürnberg, and the capture of a German amateur title in 1972 in a 2–1 victory over TSV Marl-Hüls. The club contested the final of the 1938 Tschammerpokal, predecessor of today's DFB-Pokal, but was beaten 1–3 by Rapid Vienna.

The club played in the Bezirksliga Main, then the Bezirksliga Main-Hessen throughout the 1920s and 1930s. After capturing the championship of the VSFV (Verband Süddeutscher Fussball Vereine or Federation of South German Football Clubs) in 1933, FSV went on to play in the Gauliga Südwest, one of sixteen top-flight divisions formed that same year in the re-organization of German football in the Third Reich. They consistently earned mid-table results there with the club's best finish being second place in 1939. In 1941 the Gauliga Hessen was split into the Gauliga Westmark and the Gauliga Hessen-Nassau with FSV playing in the latter division. The team finished a close second to Kickers Offenbach in 1943 and in 1944 merged briefly with SG Eintracht Frankfurt to play as the wartime side KSG (Kriegspielgemeinschaft) Frankfurt. The following season the Gauliga collapsed with the advance of Allied armies into Germany as World War II drew to a close.

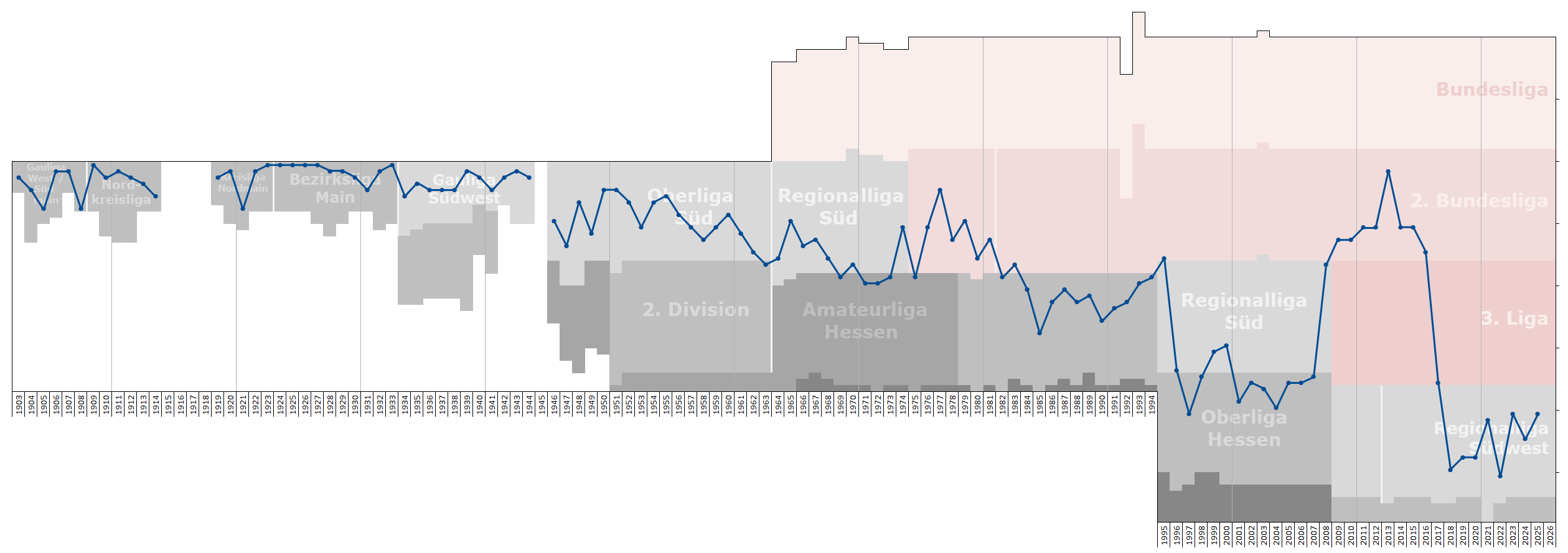
Historical chart of FSV Frankfurt league performance

After the war occupying Allied authorities ordered the dissolution of all organizations in Germany, including sports and football clubs. FSV was re-established as SG Bornheim but had taken on their old identity again by late 1945. The team resumed play in the first division Oberliga Süd where they played undistinguished, middling football until relegated at the end of the 1961–62 season. The Bundesliga, Germany's first top-flight professional league, was formed in 1963. FSV joined the Regionalliga Süd and remained a regular tier II side from the early 1960s through to the early 1970s when they slipped to the third tier. The club returned to the second tier in 1975 a year after the formation of the 2. Bundesliga, playing in the 2. Bundesliga Süd. In 1981 the northern and southern divisions of this league were combined and as a perennial lower table side FSV was delivered to the third division Oberliga Hessen (III). The club made a single season cameo appearance in the combined league in 1982–83 before once again falling back.

They played in the Regionalliga Süd (III) in 2007–08 after seven seasons in the Amateur Oberliga Hessen (IV). Winning the championship of the Regionalliga Süd (III), for the 2008–09 season the club was promoted to the 2. Bundesliga, where it played for eight seasons with moderate success before relegation to the 3. Liga at the end of the 2015–16 season.

== Reserve team ==
The club's reserve team, the FSV Frankfurt II, rose for the first time above local Hesse level in 2010 when it won the Hessenliga and was promoted to the Regionalliga Süd. After two seasons, this league was disbanded in 2012 and FSV II became part of the new Regionalliga Südwest. It was relegated to the Hessenliga in 2013 and disbanded the following year after a rule change which meant professional clubs did not have to have a reserve side any more, something that previously had been compulsory.

== Frankfurt derby ==
The 2011–12 season saw FSV Frankfurt play city rivals Eintracht Frankfurt in a league match for the first time in almost 50 years. The last league game between the two had been played on 27 January 1962, then in the Oberliga Süd. For the first of the two matches, FSV's home game on 21 August 2011, the decision was made to move to Eintracht's stadium as FSV's Volksbankstadion only holds less than 11,000 spectators and in excess of 40,000 spectators were expected to attend the game.

== Honours ==
=== League ===
- German football championship
  - Runners-up: 1925
- Southern German championship
  - Champions: 1933
- German amateur champions
  - Champions: 1972
- Nordkreis-Liga (I)
  - Champions: 1917
  - Runners-up: 1911, 1916, 1918
- Kreisliga Nordmain (I)
  - Champions: 1923
  - Runners-up: 1920
- Bezirksliga Main (I)
  - Champions: 1924, 1925, 1926, 1927
- Bezirksliga Main-Hessen (I)
  - Champions: 1933
- 2. Oberliga Süd (II)
  - Champions: 1963
- Oberliga Hessen (III–IV)
  - Champions: 1969, 1973, 1975, 1982, 1994, 1998, 2007, 2010^{‡}
  - Runners-up: 1993, 2002, 2005, 2006
- Verbandsliga Hessen-Süd (VI)
  - Champions: 2009^{‡}

=== Cup ===
- German Cup
  - Runners-up: 1938
- Hesse Cup (Tiers III–VII)
  - Winners: 1990, 2023
  - Runners-up: 1982, 1986, 2006, 2020

- ^{‡} Won by reserve team.

== Recent seasons ==
The recent season-by-season performance of the club:

Season	Division	Tier	Position
1999–00	Regionalliga Süd	III	14th ↓
2000–01	Oberliga Hessen	IV	4th
2001–02	Oberliga Hessen	IV	2nd
2002–03	Oberliga Hessen	IV	3rd
2003–04	Oberliga Hessen	IV	6th
2004–05	Oberliga Hessen	IV	2nd
2005–06	Oberliga Hessen	IV	2nd
2006–07	Oberliga Hessen	IV	1st ↑
2007–08	Regionalliga Süd	III	1st ↑
2008–09	2. Bundesliga	II	15th
2009–10	2. Bundesliga	II	15th
2010–11	2. Bundesliga	II	13th
2011–12	2. Bundesliga	II	13th
2012–13	2. Bundesliga	II	4th
2013–14	2. Bundesliga	II	13th
2014–15	2. Bundesliga	II	13th
2015–16	2. Bundesliga	II	17th ↓
2016–17	3. Liga	III	20th ↓
2017–18	Regionalliga Südwest	IV	14th
2018–19	Regionalliga Südwest	IV	12th
2019–20	Regionalliga Südwest	IV	12th
2020–21	Regionalliga Südwest	IV	6th
2021–22	Regionalliga Südwest	IV	15th
2022–23	Regionalliga Südwest	IV	5th
2023–24	Regionalliga Südwest	IV	9th
2024–25	Regionalliga Südwest	IV	5th
2025–26	Regionalliga Südwest	IV	3rd

- With the introduction of the Regionalligas in 1994 and the 3. Liga in 2008 as the new third tier, below the 2. Bundesliga, all leagues below dropped one tier.

↑ Promoted	↓ Relegated

== Players ==
=== Current squad ===
As of 8 September 2026

Note: Flags indicate national team as defined under FIFA eligibility rules; some limited exceptions apply. Players may hold more than one non-FIFA nationality.

No.	Pos.	Nation	Player
1	GK	GER	Lucas Becker
3	DF	GER	Christoph Ehlich
4	DF	GER	Tim Weißmann
5	DF	GER	Phil Kemper
6	MF	GER	Elias Breir
7	MF	GER	George Iorga
8	MF	ITA	Giorgio Del Vecchio
9	FW	GER	Emmanuel McDonald
10	FW	NED	Cas Peters
11	MF	GER	Ismail Harnafi
13	DF	GER	Lukas Gottwalt
14	FW	BIH	Amar Suljić

No.	Pos.	Nation	Player
15	DF	GER	Nick Doktorczyk
16	MF	GER	Tom Grimmer
17	FW	GER	Filip Bandza
21	MF	GER	David Deger
22	DF	MAR	Mohamed Akhouaji
24	MF	GER	Leandro Simunic
27	DF	GER	Dwayn Meene
29	FW	GER	Uche Obiogumu
30	DF	GER	Corvin Bock
31	GK	GER	Lars Schoen
32	GK	GER	Jonas Iwan
33	GK	GER	Louis Held

=== Former players ===
Listed are former players with at least one international appearance for their respective national team during their careers

- (Germany) Richard Herrmann, 1954 FIFA World Cup winner
- (Australia) Mathew Leckie, 2014 FIFA World Cup participant

Both players took part while under contract of FSV Frankfurt

- (Ghana) Alexander Opoku
- (Ghana) Lawrence Aidoo
- (Hungary) Zsolt Kalmár
- (Iran) Ehsan Hajsafi
- (Iran) Amir Shapourzadeh
- (Italy) Vincenzo Grifo
- (Nigeria) Taiwo Awoniyi
- (Germany) Georg Knöpfle, 1928 Summer Olympics participant, Scoring for FSV Frankfurt to be German Champion in the Final 1933, most international appearances under contract of FSV Frankfurt
- (Germany) Willibald Kreß, 1934 FIFA World Cup participant
- (Germany) Albert Eschenlohr
- (Germany) Hans Schmidt
- (Germany) Jens Rasiejewski
- (Germany) Ronny Borchers
- (Germany) Hanno Balitsch
- (Germany) Björn Schlicke
- (Germany) Alexander Klitzpera
- (Germany) Alexander Voigt
- (Morocco) Adil Chihi
- (Morocco) Aziz Bouhaddouz, 2018 FIFA World Cup participant
- (Morocco) Youssef Mokhtari
- (Finland) Pekka Lagerblom
- (The Gambia) Pa Saikou Kujabi
- (Canada) Nikolas Ledgerwood
- (Albania) Jürgen Gjasula
- (Albania) Artur Maxhuni
- (Albania) Faton Toski
- (Romania) Vlad Munteanu
- (Mali) Bakary Diakité
- (Mali) Soumaïla Coulibaly
- (Senegal) Momar N'Diaye
- (Tunisia) Jawhar Mnari
- (Bulgaria) Ilian Mitsanski
- (Algeria) Chadli Amri
- (Algeria) Karim Benyamina
- (Senegal) Babacar Gueye
- (Belarus) Vyacheslav Hleb
- (Albania) Odise Roshi
- (Albania) Edmond Kapllani
- (Sweden) Rasmus Jönsson
- (Lebanon) Joan Oumari
- (Finland) Joni Kauko
- (Australia) Nikita Rukavytsya, 2010 FIFA World Cup participant
- (United States) Andrew Wooten
- (Slovenia) Zlatko Dedić
- (Algeria) Mohamed Amine Aoudia
- (Cambodia) Chhunly Pagenburg
- (Malta) André Schembri
- (Tunisia) Sofian Chahed
- (Kazakhstan) Heinrich Schmidtgal
- (Kosovo) Fanol Përdedaj
- (Kosovo) Besar Halimi
- (Denmark) Niki Zimling
- (Afghanistan) Milad Salem
- (Luxembourg) Maurice Deville
- (Togo) Alban Sabah
- (Malaysia) La'Vere Corbin-Ong
- (Burkina Faso) Moïse Bambara
- (Slovakia) Henrich Benčík
- (Belarus) Gennadi Bliznyuk
- (Philippines) Dennis Cagara
- (Tunisia) Slaheddine Fessi
- (Socialist Federal Republic of Yugoslavia) Vladimir Firm
- (Jamaica) Daniel Gordon
- (Poland) Jacek Grembocki
- (United States) Chris Henderson
- (Cameroon) Mohammadou Idrissou
- (Bosnia and Herzegovina) Sead Kapetanović
- (Denmark) Miklos Molnar
- (Switzerland) Robert Pache
- (Burkina Faso) Kassoum Ouédraogo
- (Peru) Junior Ross
- (Austria) Christoph Westerthaler
- (Sweden) Carl Wijk
- (Ghana) Joe Addo
- (Norway) Jean-Louis Bretteville
- (England) William Townley, team manager

== Staff ==
=== Sports ===
- Head Coach: Tim Görner
- Assistant Coach: TBA
- Goalkeeping Coach : Christoph Gerigk
- Athletics Coach : Nele Mosqueda

== Recent managers ==
Recent managers of the club:

Manager	Start	Finish
Tomas Oral	1 July 2006	4 Oct 2009
Hans-Jürgen Boysen	7 Oct 2009	17 Dec 2011
Benno Möhlmann	21 Dec 2011	18 May 2015
Tomas Oral	18 May 2015	10 April 2016
Falko Götz	11 April 2016	June 2016
Roland Vrabec	16 June 2016	6 March 2017
Gino Lettieri	7 March 2017	18 May 2017
Alexander Conrad	1 July 2017	13 April 2019
Thomas Brendel	14 April 2019	30 June 2021
Angelo Barletta	1 July 2021	26 September 2021
Thomas Brendel	27 September 2021	15 March 2022
Tim Görner	15 March 2022	30 June 2026
Victor Kleinhenz	1 July 2026	present

== Women's department ==
The women's team won three championships and five cups, even completing a double in 1995, but was retired after the 2005–06 season due to financial weakness. In its time FSV had many German top football players, including national record scorer Birgit Prinz, who left in 1998 for local rival 1. FFC Frankfurt.

=== Honours ===
- German Championship: 1986, 1995, 1998
- DFB-Pokal winner: 1985, 1990, 1992, 1995, 1996

=== Notable past players ===
The following players who have played for Frankfurt have been capped for Germany at least 50 times:

- Birgitt Austermühl
- Steffi Jones
- Sandra Minnert
- Birgit Prinz
- Sissy Raith
- Sandra Smisek
- Britta Unsleber

== Other sports departments ==
As a sports club FSV has had at various times departments for athletics, boxing, darts, handball, ice hockey, and tennis.
