= Rouvres, Calvados =

Rouvres
- Commune
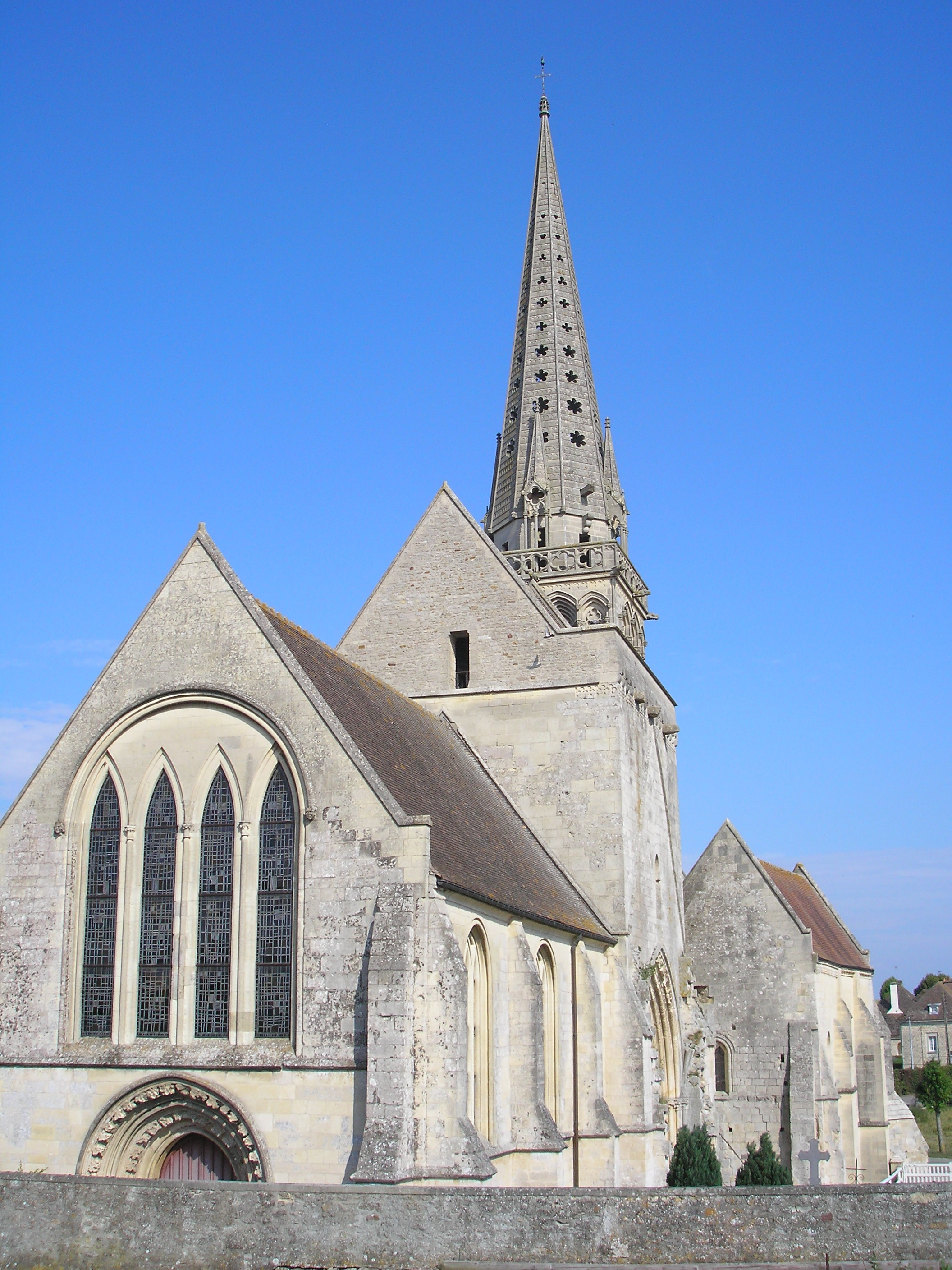
- The church in Rouvres
- Location of Rouvres
- Location within France Location within Normandy
- Coordinates: 49°00′19″N 0°10′15″W
- Country: France
- Region: Normandy
- Department: Calvados
- Arrondissement: Caen
- Canton: Falaise
- Intercommunality: Pays de Falaise

Government
  - Mayor (2020–2026): Jean-Louis Amblard
- Area^{1}: 8.87 km^{2} (3.42 sq mi)
- Elevation: 100 m (330 ft)
- Highest elevation: 135 m (443 ft)
- Lowest elevation: 54 m (177 ft)
- Population (2023): 220
  - Density: 25/km^{2} (64/sq mi)
- Time zone: UTC+01:00 (CET)
  - Summer (DST): UTC+02:00 (CEST)
- INSEE/Postal code: 14546 /14190
- ^{1} French Land Register data, which excludes lakes, ponds, glaciers > 1 km^{2} (0.386 sq mi or 247 acres) and river estuaries.

Rouvres (French pronunciation: [ʁuvʁ]) is a commune in the Calvados department in the Normandy region in northwestern France.

== Geography ==
A single watercourse, the river Laizon flows through the commune.

== Population ==
Historical population
Year	Pop.	±% p.a.
1968	215	—
1975	194	−1.46%
1982	173	−1.62%
1990	179	+0.43%
1999	197	+1.07%
2007	214	+1.04%
2012	217	+0.28%
2017	218	+0.09%
2023	220	+0.15%
Source: INSEE

== Points of Interest ==
- Memorial Worthington Force - A memorial dedicated to the Worthington Force and the Battle for Hill 140.

=== National heritage sites ===
The commune has two sites listed as a Monument historique.

- Église de l'Assomption-de-Notre-Dame de Rouvres - a twelfth century church registered as a monument in 1879.
- Grande ferme dite Logis de Rouvres - a seventeenth century farm house registered as a monument in 1933.

== See also ==
- Communes of the Calvados department
