= Elisabeth Meyer-Spreckels =

German politician

Elisabeth Meyer-Spreckels (born Elisabeth Hahn on 29 October 1890 in Dresden; died 25 May 1974 in Fürth) was a German politician of the CSU.

== Life and career ==
Elisabeth Spreckels was the granddaughter of Peter Spreckels, the brother and business partner of the German-American industrialist and so-called "Sugar King" of California Claus Spreckels, who had returned to Germany in 1885 and settled with his family in Dresden. Her brother, Walter P. Spreckels, later became an executive in one of the Spreckels family's sugar companies in the USA.

After graduating from high school, Meyer-Spreckels began studying chemistry, physics, and mathematics in Dresden and Erlangen. She later continued her studies at Bryn Mawr College, where she also completed her merit scholarship. In 1915, she passed her state examination in food chemistry, and shortly afterwards received her doctorate in Erlangen. The topic of her doctoral thesis was "Zur Kenntnis dimolekularer Nitrile und deren Abkömmlinge" ["On the knowledge of dimolecular nitriles and their derivatives."] She was then employed as an assistant at the Chemical Institute of the Dresden Technical University, and later worked at the Dresden Municipal Research Institute. In 1918, she was appointed lecturer at the Chemical Institute of the University of Halle.

In 1922 she married Dr. Heinrich Meyer, a physician and otorhinolaryngologist, after which she moved to Fürth and ended her academic career. After marrying, she was mainly active in the social and cultural fields. From 1948 she was a member of the Protestant Women's League of the US Army. From 1951 to 1967 she was state chairwoman of the Deutscher Evangelischer Frauenbund (German Protestant Women's League) in Bavaria and an opinion leader for Protestant perspectives on social issues in Germany. She was also a member of the board of the German-American Advisory Committee and the International Council for Christian Leadership, was deputy chairwoman and honorary member of the Evangelischen Gesellschaft für Christlich-Jüdische Zusammenarbeit (Protestant Society for Christian-Jewish Cooperation), second chairwoman of the umbrella organization of Protestant women's associations in Bavaria and a board member of the Inner Mission in Fürth.

In 1954, she participated in the founding of the Mother and Child Home in Fürth. In 1960, at the invitation of the US government, she undertook a six-month fact-finding and study trip through the United States.

== Political career ==
In 1945, Meyer-Spreckels was a founding member of the CSU. Within the party, she served on the state executive committee for several years and was also responsible for its management. In 1947, she participated in the founding of the State Women's Working Group within the CSU, and the following year she became deputy chairwoman of the CDU/CSU Women's Working Group.

In 1946, she initially served on the Advisory State Committee, the so-called Preparatory Parliament, and was also a member of the political advisory board of the Bavarian State Ministry for Special Affairs. Shortly afterwards, she was a member of the first post-war Bavarian Constituent Assembly and, as a deputy member of the Constitutional Committee, participated in the drafting of the Bavarian State Constitution, where she made a significant contribution to enshrining gender equality in the constitution.

From 1948 to 1952, Meyer-Spreckels was a member of the Fürth city council and during this time was parliamentary group leader of the CSU. In 1949, she ran for the Federal Bundestag.

== Honors ==
- 1961: Federal Cross of Merit
- 1972: Golden Citizen's Medal of the City of Fürth
- 2002: Naming of Dr.-Meyer-Spreckels-Straße in Fürth
