= Spreckelsen =

Spreckelsen or von Spreckelsen is a German surname associated with von Spreckelsen family, a historically prominent family of Hamburg, see Spreckelsen (surname) for more details. Notable people with the surname include:

- Hein Spreckelsen (1934–2023), German Lutheran theologian
- Johan Otto von Spreckelsen (1929–1987), Danish architect
- John von Spreckelsen, British businessperson; former CEO of Budgens Stores and former Chair of Somerfield Stores
- Tilman Spreckelsen (born 1967), German author

== See also ==
- Spreckels
