= Spreckels family =

American Pacific Coast business family

The Spreckels family is a German-American business and philanthropic dynasty founded by German-American immigrant Claus Spreckels (1828–1908). Their wealth derived from at first from sugar production, later branching into railroads, shipping, real estate, and other enterprises in the late nineteenth and early twentieth centuries. The family also played a major role in the economic development of San Francisco, San Diego, central California, and Hawaiʻi.

== Origins ==
Spreckels is one of several variations of Spreckelsen and related surnames that are common in northern Germany. The name may be derived from town of Spreckens, today a district in the municipality of Bremervörde in Lower Saxony. Claus Spreckels came from a smallholder farming family in the village of Lamstedt in the Kingdom of Hanover, now in Lower Saxony.

== History ==
Claus Spreckels migrated to the United States in 1848, both to escape mandatory military service and for greater economic opportunity. By his account, he arrived in the US with 1 German thaler in his pocket (the equivalent of 75 cents at the exchange rate of the time, or about $30 in 2023 dollars). He went on to become one of the most powerful entrepreneurs on the Pacific Coast. Claus was widely known as the "Sugar King of California" for building a dominant sugar empire spanning California and the Kingdom of Hawaiʻi. He established sugar refineries in San Francisco and the Central Coast, invested in sugar beet cultivation, and expanded into Hawaiian sugarcane plantations, mills, and irrigation works. At the time of his death, he was among the wealthiest men in California.

Claus's sons further extended the family's influence. John D. Spreckels (1853–1926) developed the Oceanic Steamship Company, a major Pacific shipping line that was vertically integrated with his father's Hawaiian operations. He later became a leading developer of San Diego through investments in railroads, utilities, hotels, and newspapers. Adolph B. Spreckels (1857–1924) remained active in San Francisco business, participated in the early expansion of the California oil industry, and was a noted racehorse breeder. He married Alma de Bretteville Spreckels (1881–1968), who came from a modest background but, after marrying into the Spreckels family, used her wealth to become a prominent art patron and philanthropist who helped found San Francisco's California Palace of the Legion of Honor. She was a colorful figure, later nicknamed "The Great Grandmother of San Francisco".

The two youngest sons, Rudolph Spreckels (1872–1958) and Claus August "Gus" Spreckels (1858–1946), established themselves as prominent business leaders in their own right and often bitter rivals of their father and elder brothers. Rudolph also gained a reputation as a civic reformer and anti-corruption advocate in early twentieth-century San Francisco.

Companies such as the Spreckels Sugar Company, the Western Sugar Refinery, and the Oceanic Steamship Company remained family-controlled enterprises for half a century after the death of Claus Spreckels. After the deaths of Adolph and John Spreckels in the 1920s, however, Alma Spreckels and other family members began selling off these assets and drawing down the resources of the companies they retained. The remaining family businesses were dissolved or sold in the late 1940s. A few family members remained active on the board of the Spreckels Sugar Company until 1962.

Later generations were often better known as socialites and playboys than as business figures, though direct and in-law descendants such as John N. Rosekrans, Jr. (1928–2001) and Charles de Bretteville (1913–1992) remained prominent business leaders into the late twentieth century. The family's legacy remains visible in California and Hawaiʻi through buildings, former company towns, and other sites bearing the Spreckels name.

== Modern descendants ==
In 2018, Spreckels biographer Sandra Bonura organized a reunion in San Diego that brought together 45 descendants of Claus Spreckels from several western states. The gathering reunited members of family branches that had become separated over generations and encouraged interest in the family's history among descendants who knew little about their heritage.

== See also ==
- Spreckels (surname), list of people with the surname
- Le Normand de Bretteville family
