= Charles de Bretteville =

California business executive and banker

- Born: Charles Edouard de Bretteville; March 11, 1913; San Francisco, California, U.S.
- Died: September 4, 1992 (aged 79); Monterey, California, U.S.
- Education: Stanford University (BA, 1934); Harvard School of Business Administration (1936)
- Occupations: business executive, banker
- Employer(s): Spreckels Sugar Company; Bank of California
- Title: President (Spreckels Sugar Company); President, CEO, Chairman (Bank of California)
- Spouse: Frances Mein de Bretteville
- Children: 4
- Parent(s): Alexander de Bretteville; Clarisse Lyons de Bretteville
- Relatives: Alma de Bretteville Spreckels (aunt); Adolph B. Spreckels (uncle)

Charles de Bretteville (March 11, 1913 – September 4, 1992) was an American banker and business executive during the mid-20th century in California. He served as president of the Spreckels Sugar Company and later as president, chief executive officer, and chairman of the Bank of California.

== Early life ==
Charles de Bretteville was born in San Francisco, California, the son of Alexander de Bretteville and his wife Clarisse Lyons. Through his father, he was descended from the Franco-Danish noble family of Le Normand de Bretteville. His mother was from a British Jewish family. Charles uncle by marriage was Adolph B. Spreckels, an heir to the Claus Spreckels fortune and head of the Spreckels Sugar Company and other Spreckels family businesses. His aunt was Alma de Bretteville Spreckels, Adolph's wife and eventual heir to his fortune.

Although Alexander de Bretteville was a successful businessman in his own right, eventually becoming vice-president of the Union Iron Works in San Francisco, upon Adolph Spreckels's death in 1924, his sister Alma insisted that he leave his position and work for her, representing her interests in the Spreckels companies and acting as her personal financial manager. Despite his lack of knowledge of the sugar business, he was soon made vice-president of the J. D. and A. B. Spreckels Company, the holding company that controlled the Spreckels family's companies.

Charles attended Galileo High School in San Francisco and later received a Bachelor of Arts degree from Stanford University in 1934. He subsequently attended Harvard School of Business Administration until 1936. In 1938, he married Frances Mein.

== Career ==
In 1935, Charles followed his father into the Spreckels family businesses, starting out in sales for $150 per month (about $3,500 per month in 2025 dollars), rising to the position of western sales manager by 1942. His business career was interrupted by the outbreak of World War II when he joined the United States Navy and served from 1942 to 1945. He held the rank of lieutenant commander, serving aboard the USS Bunker Hill in the Pacific theater.

=== Leadership of Spreckels Companies ===
Returning to the Spreckels companies after the war, Charles de Bretteville quickly rose through the ranks as an executive. In 1947, he took his father's seat on the board of directors of the Spreckels Sugar Company and soon after became vice-president of the J. D. and A. B. Spreckels Company, as well as president of three Spreckels sugar cane plantation interests, the Hakalau Sugar Plantation Company and Kilauea Sugar Plantation Company in Hawaii and the Pampanga Sugar Mills in the Philippines.

De Bretteville's ascendancy coincided with a transitional period for the Spreckels business empire. After the deaths of Adolph and his brother John D. Spreckels in the 1920s, their heirs took scant interest in the companies and did little to reinvest in them, instead draining company coffers to maintain their personal fortunes and philanthropic interests. In the late 1940s, infighting among the heirs and mounting company debts reached a critical point, leading Alma Spreckels to liquidate her share of stock in the Spreckels companies, selling it to Blair Holdings, an investment company owned by Virgil Dardi.

De Bretteville and Dardi then organized a fundamental restructuring of the ownership of the Spreckels companies. Previous holding companies for the Spreckels businesses were dissolved, stock belonging to most of the Spreckels family heirs was bought out, and a new holding company known as the Spreckels Companies was created, with Charles de Bretteville as president. The new company differed from the previous Spreckels holding companies in that the majority of the Spreckels family no longer held stock and investors from outside the family, notably Blair Holdings, owned significant shares.

In 1950, the American Sugar Refining Company, which already held 50% stake in the Spreckels Sugar Company (an arrangement that went back to Claus Spreckels founding of the company) bought out Blair Holdings' 40% stake of the Spreckels companies, leaving it as the largest shareholder of Spreckels Sugar overall and a significant minority interest in the Spreckels Companies. American offered to buy out the remaining shareholders, but the offer was rebuffed. In 1951, de Bretteville became president of the Spreckels Sugar Company.

De Bretteville stepped down as Spreckels Sugar president in 1962 and sold his stake in the Spreckels Company to the American Sugar Refining, allowing it to fully take over the companies. Spreckels Sugar Company was then merged in as a division of that company, rebranded as the American Sugar Company.

=== Bank of California ===
He became president of the Bank of California immediately following his departure as president of Spreckels Sugar. He had already been a member of the board of directors of the bank for the previous 10 years. During his tenure, he served successively as president, chief executive officer, and chairman.

The Bank of California was one of the oldest banks in the Western US, and while it was highly regarded and had control of a large amount of capital, the bank was not growing by that time. De Bretteville was tasked with revitalizing the Bank of California. Over the next decade, he oversaw modest growth in the number of offices, especially in Southern California. However, the bank's stock prices remained flat.

One way that de Bretteville attempted to stimulate growth was to bring in new investment, and one of the investors that he courted was French banking magnate Baron Edmond Adolphe de Rothschild, who ended up purchasing 17% of BanCal Tri-State Corporation, the holding company that owned the Bank of California. He had thought Rothschild would then resell the shares to other members of the Rothschild banking family, but instead, Rothschild held all of it and purchased even more shares, eventually holding 30% of the stock, becoming the largest single shareholder in BanCal and gaining substantial influence over the bank. In 1976, de Bretteville was forced to step down as chairman of the board in favor of Rothschild's preferred appointee, Chauncy Schmidt. Nevertheless, he would remain a board member of the bank for another two years.

== Later activities ==
In 1983, de Bretteville helped found The Pacific Bank in San Francisco and remained a board member until his death. He also served on the boards for numerous other corporations, among them Pacific Gas and Electric Company (PG&E), Safeway Stores, Shell USA, Western Union, and Ridder Publications. He was a trustee of Menlo College and participated in civic and social organizations in the San Francisco area, including the Bohemian Club and the Pacific-Union Club, where he served as president.

== Terrorist target ==
In August 1975, a terrorist bombing of his home in Woodside, California destroyed a car and damaged a carport, but caused no injuries. He was out of town at the time, though one of his daughters was present at the home. Police stated that graffiti at the scene reading "NWLF" marked the bombing as the work of the New World Liberation Front. Soon after, FBI investigators announced that they had previously found de Bretteville's name on a list of about 25 potential targets titled "Possible People to Snatch", recovered from a Symbionese Liberation Army (SLA) safe house in Concord, California the year before. Police investigators had suspected a link between the two groups, which were active at around the same time. However, FBI investigators were of the opinion that there was no connection between the two groups. Investigators speculated that he might have been targeted due to his position on the PG&E board of directors, as the NWLF had targeted facilities and offices of that company in previous bombings.

== Personal life and death ==
De Bretteville lived in Woodside, California, before moving to Pebble Beach, California following his retirement from banking in 1978. He died on September 4, 1992, at the nearby Community Hospital of the Monterey Peninsula, at the age of 79. The cause of death was reported as a heart attack. He was survived by his wife, Frances Mein de Bretteville, and four children.
