= Spreckels Sugar Company =

American sugar manufacturer

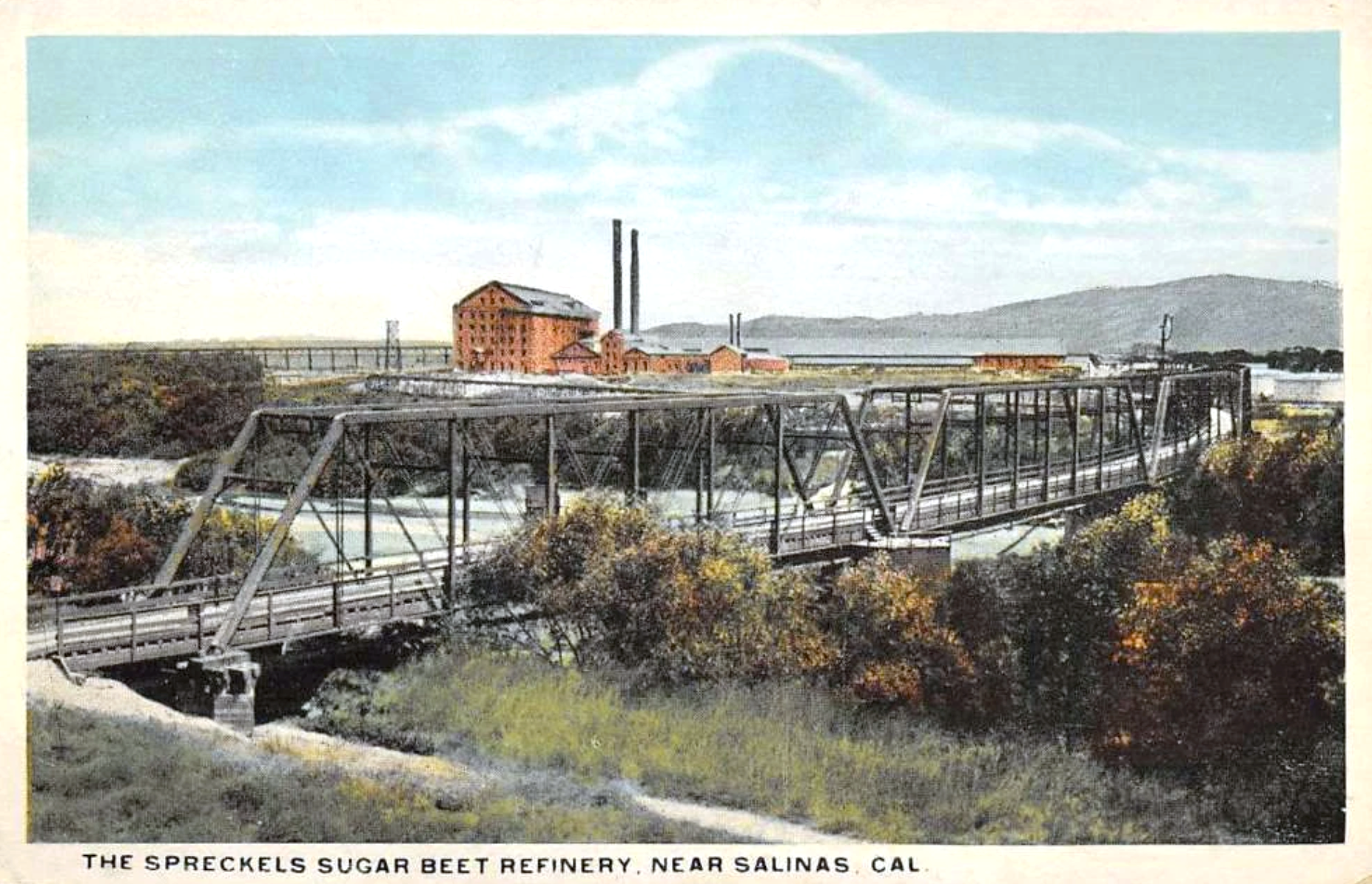
- Spreckels Sugar Beet Refinery (c. 1918) in Spreckels, California
- Type: Independent corporation (1896-1963), Subsidiary (1963-2025)
- Industry: Food industry
- Predecessor: Western Beet Sugar Company (1887–1896)
- Founded: 1896; 130 years ago
- Founder: Claus Spreckels
- Defunct: 2025
- Fate: Closed by parent company, SMBSC
- Headquarters: San Francisco (1896–1985); Pleasanton, California (1986–1996), United States
- Area served: California, Arizona
- Key people: Adolph Spreckels; Alma de Bretteville Spreckels; Charles de Bretteville
- Products: white sugar (main); also beet molasses and beet pulp
- Parent: J.D. Spreckels and Brothers (1897–1949); American Sugar Company/Amstar (1963–1987); Spreckels Industries (1987–1996); Imperial Holly Corporation (1996–2001); Southern Minnesota Beet Sugar Cooperative (2001–2025)

The Spreckels Sugar Company was an American sugar beet refiner that for many years was the largest beet sugar producer in the western United States. The company was founded by the "Sugar King" Claus Spreckels and incorporated in 1896 in San Francisco, where the company was headquartered. Claus Spreckels and his heirs also operated extensive cane sugar plantations in Hawaii, which were run as the Hawaiian Commercial and Sugar Company, a large sugar refinery in San Francisco, the Western Sugar Refinery, and a beet sugar refinery in Watsonville, California, the Western Beet Sugar Company. However, of these operations, only the Western Beet Sugar Company was subsumed into the Spreckels Sugar Company. The other operations continued to run as their own independent companies.

During the early years of the company, its largest operation was its beet sugar refinery in the company town of Spreckels, near Salinas, California, as well as sugar beet farming in the Salinas Valley. It later operated seven more factory locations and extensive sugar beet acreage in California and Arizona during its years of operations. Spreckels Sugar Company operated as an independent corporation until 1963, when it was taken over by American Sugar Company (later Amstar), and operated as a subsidiary. It was sold to Imperial Holly Corporation in 1996 and finally to the Southern Minnesota Beet Sugar Cooperative (SMBSC) in 2001.

The company continued to operate as a sugar wholesaler to the food and beverage industry and was a wholly owned division of the SMBSC. A series of factory closures left one remaining plant in operation by 2009, located in the Imperial Valley town of Brawley, California. In 2025, SMBSC announced that they would be closing the Brawley factory during the following year and would shut down its Spreckels Sugar division. The company ceased operations following the summer 2025 sugar beet harvest.

== History ==
=== Founding by Claus Spreckels ===
The Spreckels Sugar Company was founded by industrialist Claus Spreckels (1828–1908), the so-called "Sugar King" of California, in 1896. The company was a continuation of Spreckels's previous efforts to produce beet sugar in the Central Coast area of California. Spreckels had pioneered the growing of sugar beets in Santa Cruz County and associates of his had operated the ultimately unsuccessful Soquel Beet Root Sugar Company, a beet sugar refinery, in what is now Capitola from 1873 to 1879. In 1888, Spreckels opened the Western Beet Sugar Company, which ran a much-larger factory in Watsonville, and financed sugar beet cultivation in the surrounding Pajaro Valley. By the end of the 1890s, Spreckels envisioned rebuilding a larger and more modern factory, but felt that the Salinas Valley would have greater potential for large-scale production of beets.

The Spreckels Sugar Company was incorporated in San Francisco on August 6, 1897, and subsumed Spreckels's earlier Watsonville operation, the Western Beet Sugar Company. Stock in the company was divided equally between J. D. Spreckels and Brothers, the Spreckels family holding company, and the American Sugar Refining Company, with a tiny portion of stock held by each of the five members of the board of directors, which included two of Claus Spreckels sons, John D. and Adolph B. Spreckels. The inclusion of the American Sugar Refining Company, Claus Spreckels former rivals who represented the monopolistic Eastern US "Sugar Trust", sprang from an 1891 agreement in which the Sugar Trust would no longer compete with Spreckels in the Western US, nor continue to pressure Spreckels to merge with them, in return for investing as significant shareholders in Spreckels's companies.

The new company's first factory was soon opened in February 1899 and was located a few miles south of the city of Salinas. At the time of its opening, the Spreckels Sugar Factory was the largest sugar refinery in the United States and the third largest in the world. The company town of Spreckels, California, was built in the area around the factory. The company also owned extensive tracts of beet-growing farmland throughout the Salinas Valley, as far south as King City. Shipping to and from the plant was mostly by a private Spreckels-owned narrow-gauge railroad system connecting to the docks at Moss Landing and to sugar beet-growing areas in the Pajaro Valley. Though most of the company's operations were in the Salinas and Pajaro Valleys, its headquarters was located in San Francisco.

=== Ongoing operation by the Spreckels family ===
Upon Claus Spreckels' death in 1908, his second son Adolph B. Spreckels assumed the management of Spreckels Sugar Company. The company expanded into California's Central Valley, purchasing beet-growing acreage there and opening a second factory in Manteca in 1917. The company's fortunes would be badly affected by the spread of beet curly top virus in the 1920s. The Manteca factory ceased operations for 9 years after the close of the season in 1922. By 1926, the sugar beet supply in California would become so low that the company had its worst year to date and nearly closed down. The years of the Great Depression would ironically represent a period of recovery for the company, due to a combination of the development of curly top-resistant varieties of sugar beet, new demands for a profitable cash crop by farmers, and the availability of cheap "Dust Bowl" labor in California. In 1936, the company opened an additional factory near the Central Valley town of Woodland.

On Adolph Spreckels death in 1924, his share of the Spreckels companies would pass to his wife, Alma de Bretteville Spreckels. Her brother and financial manager Alexander de Bretteville sat on the board of directors of the holding company that managed the Spreckels companies, including Spreckels Sugar Company. John D. Spreckels also held a significant share of these companies, and after his death in 1926, these shares were divided among his children. Ownership of Spreckels Sugar Company continued to be evenly divided between American Sugar Refining and the Spreckels heirs, whose interests were represented by a series of holding companies. However, the Spreckels family took little interest in the operation, doing little to reinvest in the company, instead draining its coffers to maintain their personal fortunes. In 1948, the company was sold to pay off debts, however, Alma Spreckels managed to engineer a takeover of the company by her nephew, Charles de Bretteville (who had earlier taken over his father Alexander de Bretteville's seat on the board of directors), who led a group that purchased controlling shares.

=== Sales of the company and operation as a subsidiary ===
In 1963, Charles de Bretteville sold his interests to the American Sugar Refining Company, which had held almost 50% share in Spreckels Sugar Company since its founding. The newly-merged company was renamed American Sugar Company (renamed again as Amstar Corporation in 1970), and became the Spreckels Sugar Division of that company for the next 24 years.

Spreckels Sugar Division became less profitable by the 1980s, and the company would close down its original sugar factory in Spreckels, California, in 1982, though it continued to use the site as a storage and packaging facility. In 1985, the company moved its headquarters to Pleasanton, California, after having been headquartered in San Francisco for 88 years.

In 1987, a management-led group of investors purchased several divisions of Amstar, including Spreckels Sugar, as well as other divisions that specialized in the production of industrial machinery and tools. The new company was known as Spreckels Industries and operated Spreckels Sugar as a division of the company. By the mid-1990s, the management of Spreckels Industries decided that their industrial products divisions were more lucrative and sold Spreckels Sugar to the sugar conglomerate Imperial Holly Corporation in 1996. Spreckels Industries changed its name to Yale International, Inc and was soon after acquired by the machinery company Columbus McKinnon.

Imperial Holly Corporation was the result of Imperial Sugar's 1988 buyout of the Holly Sugar Corporation, and following the 1996 merger, Spreckels Sugar was merged into the Holly Sugar Corporation subsidiary, but did business as Spreckels Sugar in California while using the Holly Sugar name in Wyoming and other mountain states. At the time of the merger in 1996, there were three active Spreckels Sugar factories in operation, and three additional California factories acquired from Holly Sugar. The Manteca and Hamilton City plants were closed soon after the merger and the Tracy and Brawley factories were rebranded as Spreckels Sugar operations. Imperial Holly would downsize the division over the next decade, closing the Woodland and Tracy plants in 2000 and selling the remaining Holly Sugar refineries in other states as well.

In 2001, Imperial filed for bankruptcy and sold off its Holly Sugar Corporation subsidiary to Southern Minnesota Beet Sugar Cooperative (SMBSC) of Renville, Minnesota, but nevertheless retained the rights to the Holly Sugar brand name while selling the rights to the Spreckels Sugar brand to SMBSC. SMBSC then relaunched Spreckels Sugar Company as a wholly owned subsidiary. The company closed its factory in Mendota in 2008 and its distribution facility in Tracy in 2009, leaving the Brawley refinery as its sole remaining operation, which was the last remaining sugar beet factory in California. Prior to its closure, the company operated exclusively a sugar wholesaler and sold refined sugar in bulk to the food and beverage industry, with a secondary business in beet molasses and beet pulp that was sold for commercial yeast manufacture and for animal feed.

=== Closure ===
In April 2025, SMBSC announced that they would be decommissioning the Brawley, California, refinery and closing the Spreckels Sugar division, ending sugar production in August 2025 and shutting down the site entirely in late 2025 or early 2026 once remaining product stocks had been sold. Spreckels Sugar Company was the last remaining beet sugar factory in California. It is expected that the closure will have a significant impact on the economy of Imperial County, with the loss of hundreds of jobs and local beet farmers left scrambling to find an alternate crop. Imperial County declared an economic state of emergency on September 9, 2025, following the plant's closure.

The company closed the plant soon after the end of the sugar beet harvest in August 2025. Liquidation of the factory's equipment began in October 2025.

== Factories ==
Location	Coordinates	Designation	Opened	Closed	Notes
Spreckels, California	36.620°N 121.658°W	Factory #1	1899	1982	The site continued to operate as storage and packing facility after 1982. The factory was irreparably damaged in the 1989 Loma Prieta earthquake and finally demolished in 1992. In 1995, all remaining operations at Spreckels were sold to Tanimura & Antle.
Manteca, California	37.793°N 121.200°W	Factory #2	1917	1996	
Woodland, California	38.713°N 121.754°W	Factory #3	1937	2000	
Mendota, California	36.738°N 120.320°W	Factory #4	1963	2008	
Chandler, Arizona	33.220°N 111.825°W	Factory #5	1967	1984	
Hamilton City, California	39.738°N 122.009°W	(none)	1996‡	1996	‡ Acquired from Holly Sugar Co in 1996. Closed soon after merger.
Tracy, California	37.772°N 121.422°W	(none)	1996‡	2000	‡ Acquired from Holly Sugar Co in 1996. Site operated as a packing and distribution facility until 2009.
Brawley, California	32.910°N 115.568°W	(none)	1996‡	2025	‡ Acquired from Holly Sugar Co in 1996. Sole location of the company's operations after 2009.

== Legacy ==
Spreckels, California, survived the closure of the original Spreckels Sugar factory in 1982 and as of the 2000s is considered one of the best-preserved former company towns in California. Spreckels Boulevard outside Salinas, as well as Spreckels Road outside King City, and Spreckels Boulevard in Manteca, still bear witness to the mark Spreckels Sugar made in the area.

American author John Steinbeck worked on ranches owned by Spreckels Sugar throughout the Salinas Valley in the early 1920s.
