= Jean-Louis Bretteville =

Norwegian footballer (1905-1956)

Personal information
- Date of birth: 15 June 1905
- Place of birth: Arendal, Norway
- Date of death: 9 May 1956 (aged 50)
- Position: Forward

International career
Years	Team	Apps	(Gls)
1924–1936	Norway	9	(0)

Jean-Louis Bretteville (15 June 1905 – 9 May 1956) was a Norwegian footballer. He played in nine matches for the Norway national football team from 1924 to 1936.
