= Max Wünsche =

SS officer (1914–1995)

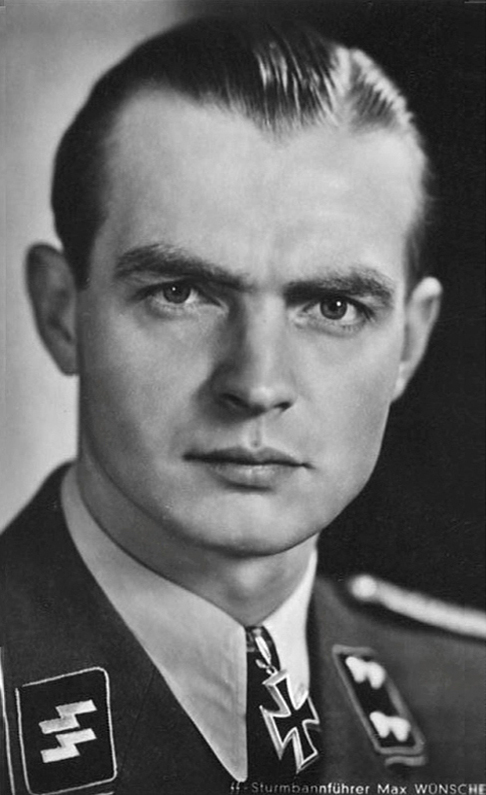
- Wünsche in 1943
- Born: 20 April 1914; Kittlitz (Löbau)de, German Empire
- Died: 17 April 1995 (aged 80); Munich, Germany
- Burial place: Munich Northern Cemetery
- Military career
- Allegiance: Nazi Germany
- Branch: Waffen-SS
- Service years: 1933–1944
- Rank: SS-Obersturmbannführer
- Service number: NSDAP #5,508,247; SS #153,508
- Units: SS Division Leibstandarte; Führerbegleitkommando; SS Division Hitlerjugend
- Conflicts: World War II
- Awards: Knight's Cross of the Iron Cross with Oak Leaves

Max Wünsche (20 April 1914 – 17 April 1995) was a member of the Waffen-SS of Nazi Germany and a regimental commander during World War II. He was a recipient of the Knight's Cross of the Iron Cross with Oak Leaves.

== Biography ==
Max Wünsche was born on 20 April 1914 in Kittlitz. In July 1933, Wünsche joined the SS. In 1935, he graduated from SS-Junkerschule at Bad Tölz and was promoted to Untersturmführer. Wünsche was then posted to the Leibstandarte SS Adolf Hitler (LSSAH) as a platoon leader. In October 1938, Wünsche was assigned as an orderly officer for Hitler. In that role, Wünsche joined the Führerbegleitkommando (the SS bodyguard unit), which provided personal security for Hitler.

In January 1940, he was again posted to the LSSAH, as a platoon commander in a motorcycle company under the command of Kurt Meyer, for the invasion of the Netherlands and the Battle of France. In December 1940 he became an adjutant to Sepp Dietrich during the invasion of the Balkans (Operation Marita) and the invasion of the Soviet Union (Operation Barbarossa). In February 1942 Wünsche was given the command of the LSSAH Sturmgeschütz (assault gun) battalion.

In 1942, Wünsche completed the General Staff training course at the Staff College in Germany and was promoted to Sturmbannführer. In September 1942, he was posted to the LSSAH and resumed command of the Sturmgeschütz battalion; in October he assumed command of a battalion in a panzer regiment of LSSAH. His battalion's first action was at Kharkov in 1943. On 25 February 1943, Wünsche's battalion went into action against a defensive position occupied by the Soviet 350th Rifle Division. Supported by artillery and a company of SS grenadiers, Wünsche's battalion attacked and overran the Soviet front lines. Wünsche's assault would lead to the destruction of 47 artillery pieces and anti-tank guns. For his actions during the battles for Kharkov, Wünsche was awarded the German Cross in Gold and later the Knight's Cross, both in February 1943.

In June 1943, Wünsche was transferred to a new division forming in France, 12th SS Panzer Division Hitlerjugend, to take command of the 12th SS Panzer Regiment. On 6 June 1944, the Allies landed in Normandy (Operation Overlord) and the division was committed to action on 7 June. The division was later trapped in the Falaise pocket, where on the night of 20 August, Wünsche escaped on foot. He was wounded and taken prisoner by British soldiers.

Wünsche spent the rest of the war as a prisoner of war in camp 165 at Caithness, Scotland, a special camp for high-ranking German officers. In 1948, Wünsche was released and returned to Germany. He died on 17 April 1995, three days short of his 81st birthday.

== Summary of SS career ==
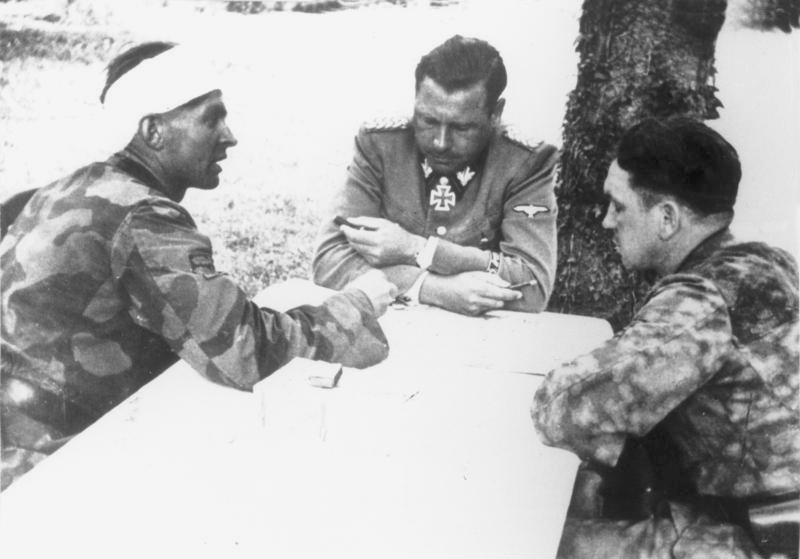
Max Wünsche (left), Fritz Witt (center), Kurt Meyer (right) on or about 7–14 June 1944 in the vicinity of Caen, France

Decorations

- Iron Cross (1939) 2nd Class (25 May 1940 & 1st Class (31 May 1940)
- German Cross in Gold on 25 February 1943 as SS-Sturmbannführer in the I./SS-Panzer-Regiment 1
- Knight's Cross of the Iron Cross with Oak Leaves
  - Knight's Cross on 28 February 1943 as SS-Sturmbannführer and commander of the I./SS-Panzer-Regiment 1.
  - 548th Oak Leaves on 11 August 1944 as SS-Obersturmbannführer and commander of SS-Panzer-Regiment 12 Hitlerjugend
