= Alma de Bretteville Spreckels =

American philanthropist (1881–1968)

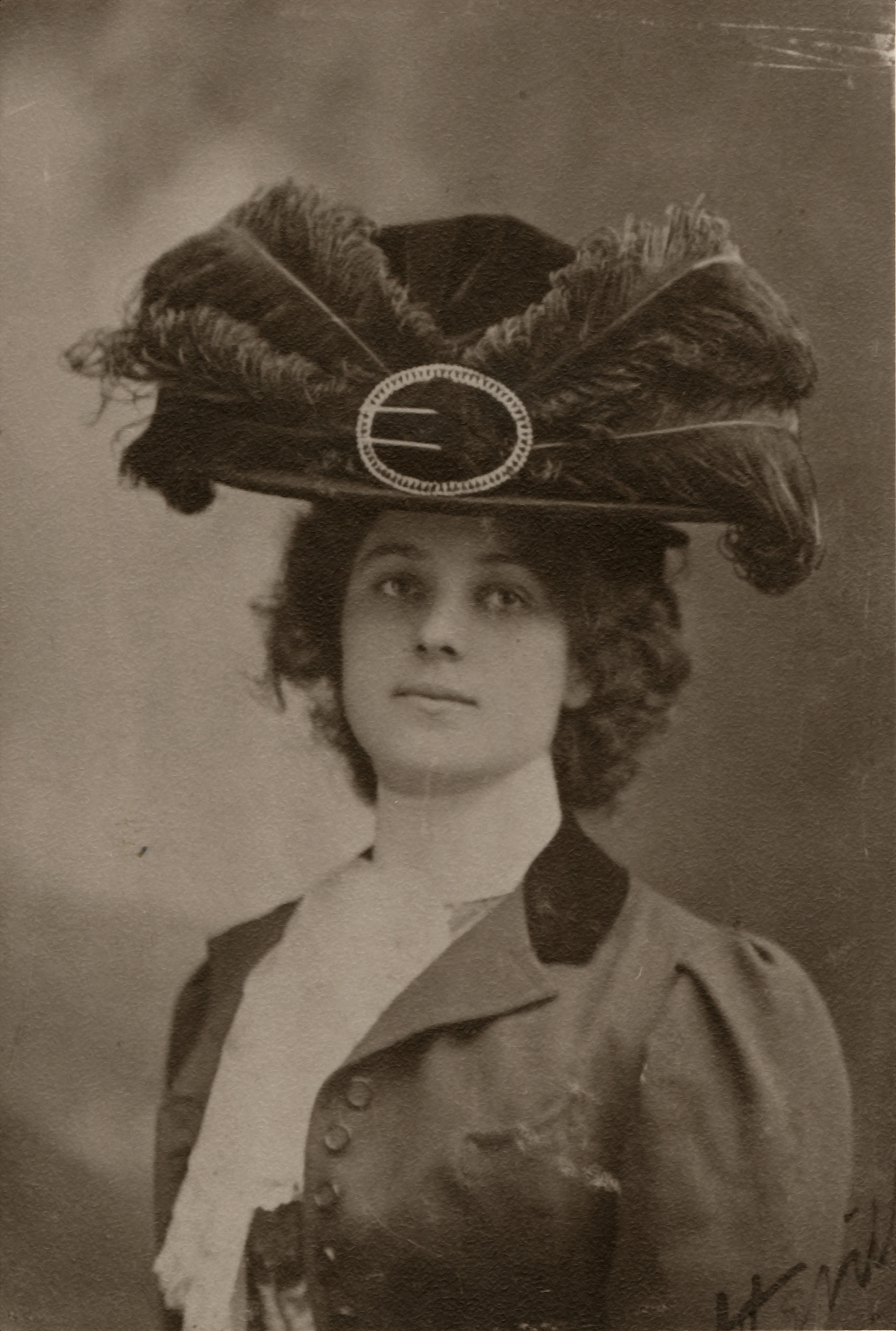
- Alma de Bretteville in 1904
- Born: Alma Charlotte Corday le Normand de Bretteville; March 24, 1881; San Francisco, California, US
- Died: August 7, 1968 (aged 87); San Francisco, California, US
- Occupations: philanthropist, art patron, art model
- Known for: Founding of the California Palace of the Legion of Honor
- Height: 6 ft 0 in (183 cm)
- Spouses: Adolph Bernard Spreckels (1908-1924); Elmer Awl (1939-1943)
- Children: 3; Alma Emma Spreckels (later Rosekrans), Adolf Bernard Spreckels, Jr., Dorothy Constance Spreckels (later Munn)
- Relatives: Charles de Bretteville (nephew)
- Honours: Grand Cross of the Legion of Honour (1924)

Alma de Bretteville Spreckels (March 24, 1881 – August 7, 1968) was a wealthy socialite and philanthropist in San Francisco, California. She was known both as "Big Alma" (she was 6 feet (1.8 m) tall) and "The Great Grandmother of San Francisco". Among her many accomplishments, she persuaded her first husband, sugar magnate Adolph B. Spreckels, to donate the California Palace of the Legion of Honor to the city of San Francisco.

== Early life ==
Alma Charlotte Corday le Normand de Bretteville was born in 1881 on a farm near Lake Merced, in the then-rural Outside Lands of San Francisco, the fifth of six children of Viggo and Mathilde de Bretteville, two Danish immigrants. Farming was difficult in the sand dunes that formed the outskirts of San Francisco at that time, and the farm was unsuccessful, prompting the family to relocate back to the main part of the city, moving to a small flat on Francisco Street, on Russian Hill. The family was very poor during her early childhood. Viggo descended from Franco-Danish noble family of le Normand de Bretteville through his great-grandfather who emigrated during the French Revolution, and used that as an excuse to avoid working while simultaneously deriding the "nouveau riche" of California. In contrast, Mathilde had enough ingenuity and business sense to open a combination Danish bakery, laundry service, and massage parlor which became the family's source of income. At age 14, Alma's father had Alma quit school to work full-time for the family laundry delivery business, often for wealthy customers whose lifestyle she came to admire.

She had developed a love of art and enrolled in the Mark Hopkins Institute of Art to study painting, eventually specializing in the painting of miniatures. While there, she earned money as an artists' model, and eventually, becoming a nude model for paintings in the city's saloons. Now flush with cash, she became popular around town, and found herself intimately involved with a wealthy Klondike ex-miner named Charlie Anderson. After their relationship deteriorated, she sued Anderson in 1902 for breach of promise and won, though Anderson soon returned to the Klondike and never paid on the lawsuit. She would later claim that she had sued him for "personal defloweration".

== Marriage to Adolf Spreckels ==
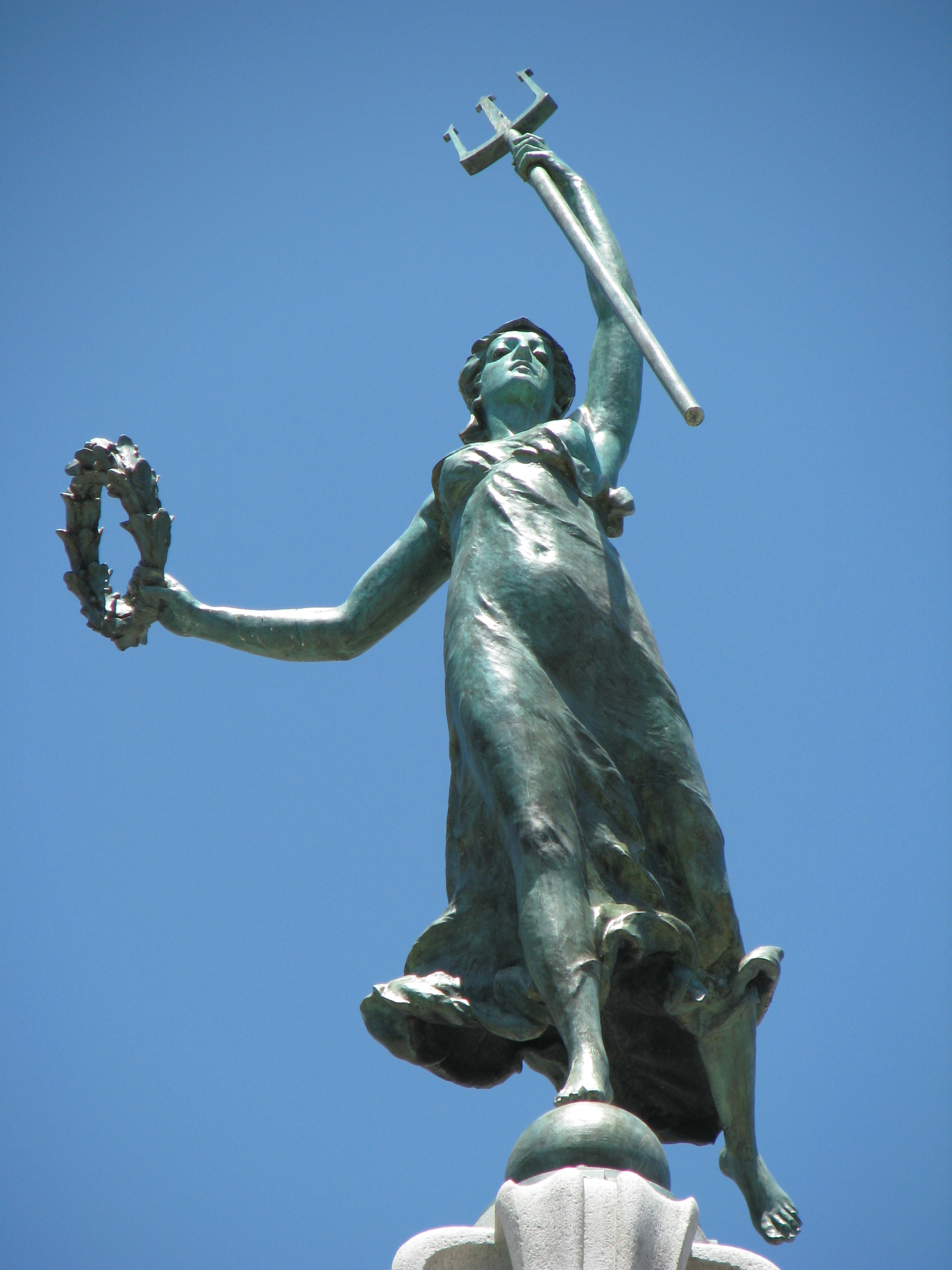
Goddess of Victory atop the Dewey Monument, Union Square, San Francisco

Alma de Bretteville met her future husband thanks to a rumor that she modeled for the Dewey Monument by Robert Aitken, which can be found in Union Square. One version of the story holds that Aitken hired Alma de Bretteville Spreckels, who had modeled for Aitken previously, to model for the statue. However, a 1902 article detailing the monument's construction states that Aitken's model was Clara Petzold or Petzoldt, a popular artists' model in San Francisco at that time. Regardless, this statue was selected from a number of entries and only barely made the cut, thanks to the crucial vote of the chair of the Citizens' Committee, Adolph B. Spreckels. Although he was 24 years older than she was, he was smitten by Alma, and after a five-year courtship, they married on May 11, 1908.

Initially, they lived in Adolph's house in Sausalito, where their first daughter, Alma Emma, was born in 1909. However he soon purchased a property in Pacific Heights where he had a Beaux-Arts mansion built, which was completed in 1912. The home was later known as the Spreckels Mansion, which in the 2000s became the home of Danielle Steel. In the meantime, son Adolph Bernard Jr. was born in 1911, followed by another daughter, Dorothy Constance, in 1913. It was after Dorothy's birth that Spreckels learned her husband had contracted syphilis before their marriage, as he began showing symptoms of the disease. Alma and her children, however, avoided contracting syphilis.

== Palace of the Legion of Honor ==
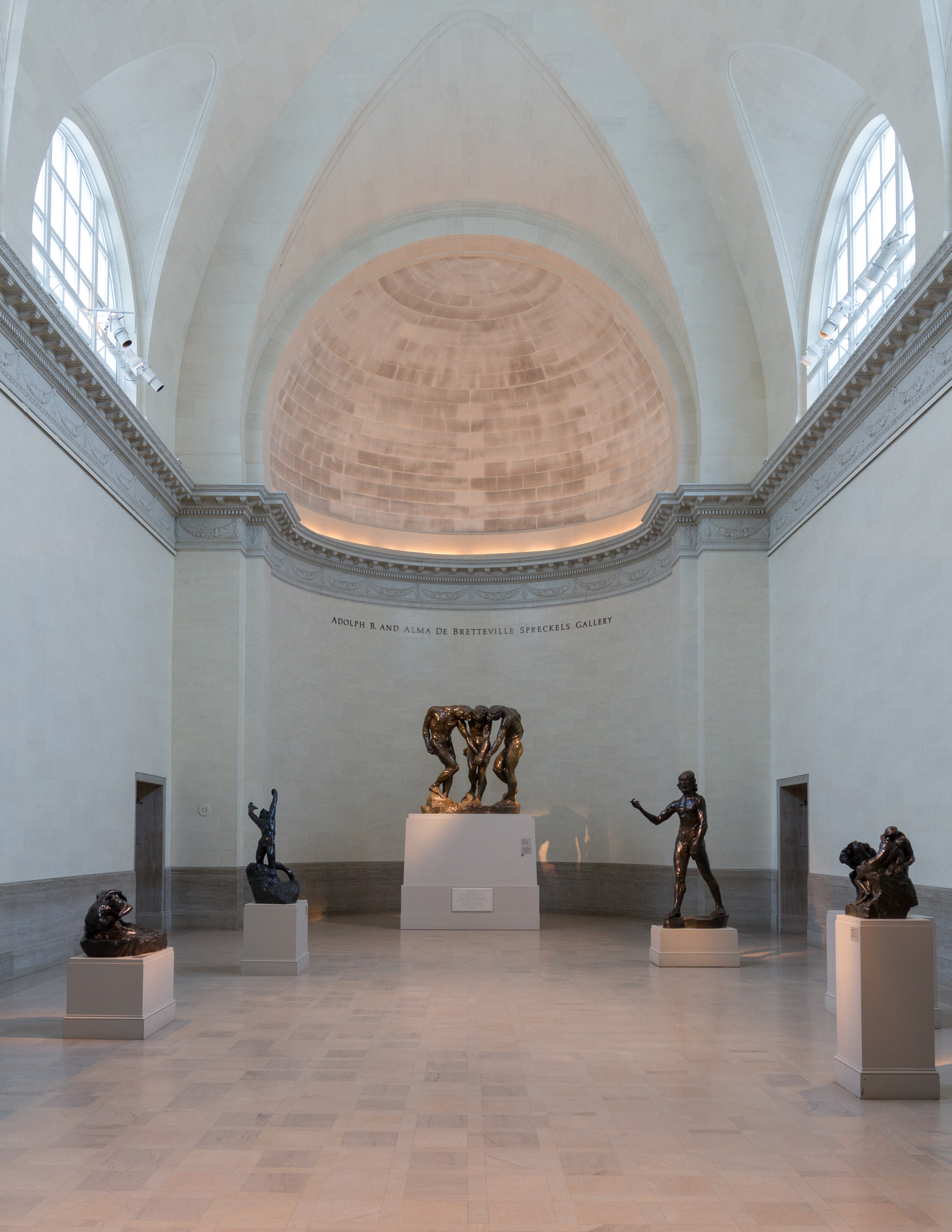
The Adolph B. and Alma de Bretteville Spreckels Gallery at the Legion of Honor showcasing sculptures of Auguste Rodin.

After the mansion was completed, Spreckels began throwing opulent parties befitting a woman of her status. Although attended by local celebrities such as author Jack London and sculptor Earl Cummings, there were a number of people who were disdainful of her earlier infamy and snubbed her invitations. This motivated her to gain some respectability for herself, which she did by going to Paris. There, she met entertainer Loie Fuller and through Fuller, other artists, most notably Auguste Rodin. With Fuller's encouragement and contacts, Alma Spreckels eventually became one of the more influential art collectors in the U.S.

She returned from Paris right after the beginning of World War I. Having purchased a number of Rodin's works directly from the artist, she had them displayed at the 1915 Panama–Pacific International Exposition. It was there that Spreckels fell in love with the French Pavilion, which was a temporary building constructed only of a wood frame covered with staff, a kind of faux stone made from a mixture of plaster and burlap-type fiber. She decided to have a permanent and exact replica of the building constructed so she could permanently contain her burgeoning art collection, but it would be another nine years before this dream could come to fruition.

In the intervening time, she busied herself with charity auctions, raising money for war-torn France, Belgium, and Romania. For one such event at the Palace Hotel, she was able to obtain donations from U.S. presidents and other renowned individuals. Her own collection was not spared: her prized Rodin The Genius of War also went on the auction block.

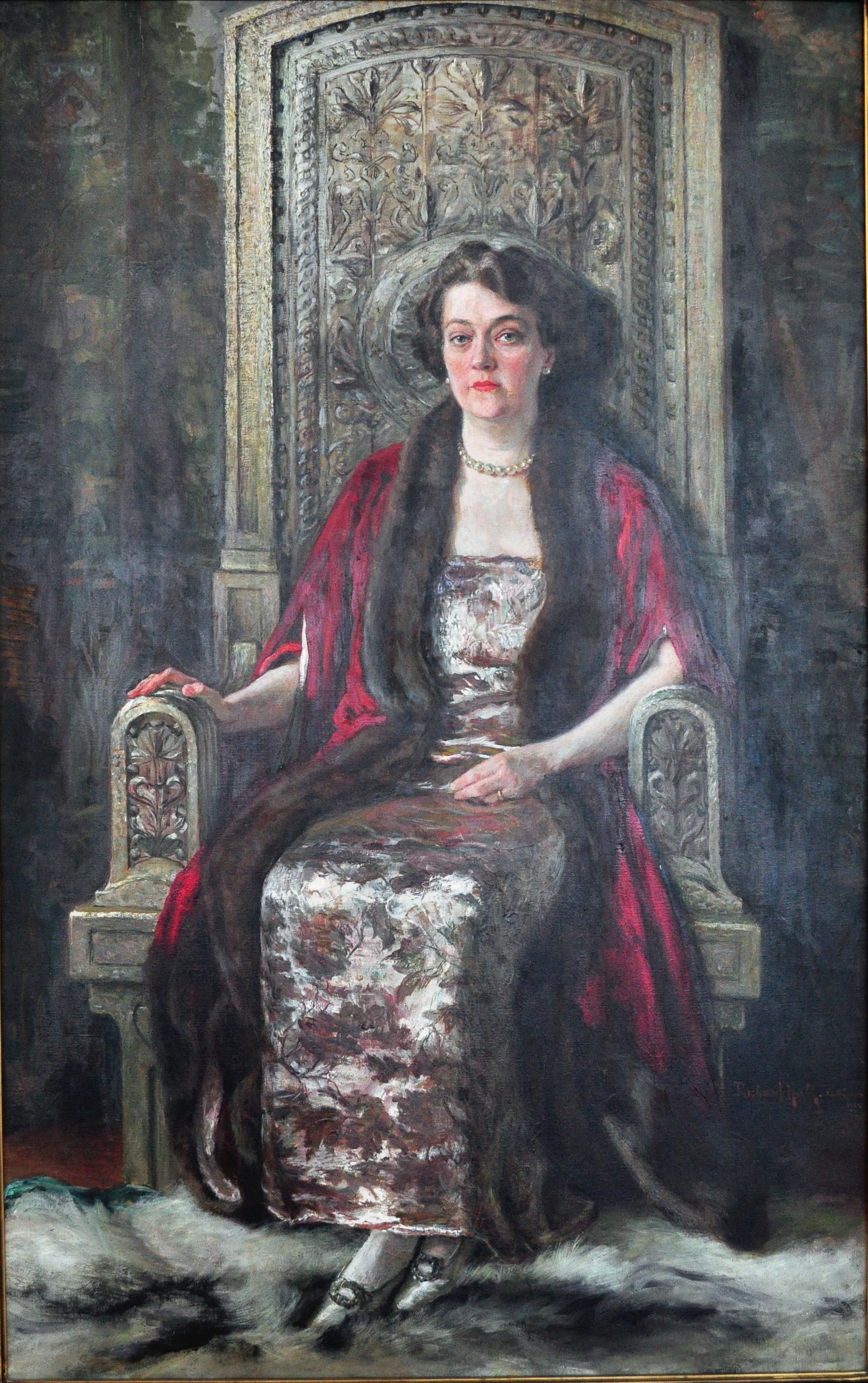
Alma de Bretteville Spreckels painted in 1924 by artist Richard Hall. In the painting, Spreckels sits in a chair originally designed (and at least partly created) by Queen Marie of Romania as an audience chair for herself. Spreckels obtained the chair in 1922 for an exhibition at the California Palace of the Legion of Honor; she eventually donated both the chair and the painting to the Maryhill Museum of Art, which she played a major role in founding.

After some persuading, Adolph eventually agreed to fund Spreckels' museum project. To acquire more art and financial support, Spreckels returned to Europe. The French government agreed to supply some, and Queen Marie of Romania donated a replica of her Byzantine Golden Room. While Spreckels was in Europe, President Warren G. Harding requested her help in compiling a report on post-war working conditions for women for the Department of Labor's Women's Bureau, which she dutifully carried out.

In 1921, ground was broken for the Palace of the Legion of Honor Museum in Lincoln Park, San Francisco. As Spreckels envisioned it, the building is an almost exact, full-scale replica of the French Pavilion from the 1915 Panama Pacific International Exposition, which in turn was a three-quarter-scale version of the Palais de la Légion d'Honneur in Paris designed by George Applegarth and H. Guillaume. At the close of the exposition, which was located just a few miles away in the current Marina district, the French government granted Adolph permission to construct a permanent replica of the French Pavilion. The museum opened on November 11, 1924, six months after Adolph's death. During the dedication ceremony, the Counsellor of State of France announced that Spreckels had been awarded the Grand Cross of the Légion d'honneur.

== Remarriage ==
Spreckels continued her charity rummage sales during the Great Depression, this time expanded to thrift shops, which were eventually given to The Salvation Army to operate. She also continued her devotion to the arts, obtaining more and more works for her museum as well as coordinating and partially funding the development of the Maryhill Museum of Art in Maryhill, Washington, after the death of her friend Samuel Hill.

Spreckels met Elmer Awl, a Santa Barbara rancher and businessman, during her inquiries into the Samarkand Hotel, a Persian-themed hotel which had fallen into disrepair. She purchased the property for $55,000 in 1937 and proceeded to renovate it, hoping to provide another home for her now-overflowing art collection. Spreckels and Awl hit it off immediately and were married in 1939. Awl moved to San Francisco, but the hotel was not particularly successful and Spreckels sent him back to Santa Barbara to manage the business, but he was also unable to stem the losses. They decided to rid themselves of the property but could not find a buyer. Eventually, the hotel was swapped for a dairy farm in Marin County worth $80,000.

When the U.S. was drawn into World War II, Awl, as a member of the United States Coast Guard Reserve, was called to active duty. While he was away, Spreckels formed a new charity, the San Francisco League for Servicemen, which gathered supplies for the Army and Navy. She even donated her vast Sonoma County ranch to the Army to use as a recreational facility. Near the end of the war, Spreckels discovered that Awl had been having an affair with her younger cousin Ulla de Bretteville, whom Alma had brought over from Denmark and who had lived with Alma for several years. She quickly divorced Awl in 1943, while he was still stationed in Central America. Elmer Awl and Ulla de Bretteville would later marry in 1945. The terms of their divorce allowed Alma to retake the name Spreckels.

== Later life ==
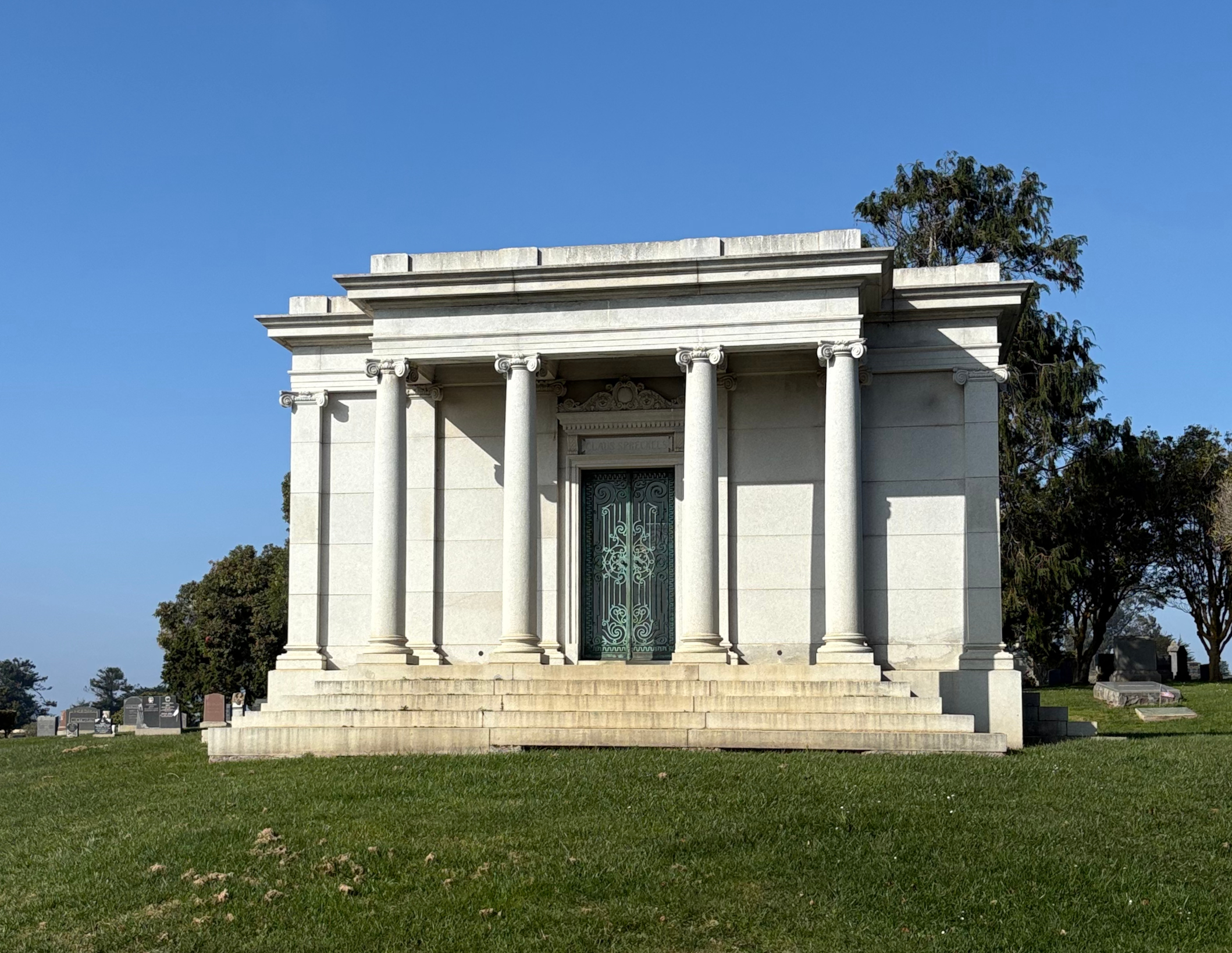
Spreckels Mausoleum at Cypress Lawn Memorial Park

Spreckels' last major project was the construction of the San Francisco Maritime Museum. When it opened in 1951, her collection of model ships that had been on display at the 1939–40 Golden Gate International Exposition was the main exhibit. However, she had had a feud with museum founding director Karl Kortum and as a result, did not receive much recognition for her role in that museum's establishment.

After her son Adolph's death in 1961, she lived mostly in seclusion, visiting only with her daughters and grandchildren. She died in 1968 of pneumonia at age 87, and was interred at Cypress Lawn Memorial Park in Colma.

== See also ==
- Spreckels family
