= Bretteville-le-Rabet =

- Commune
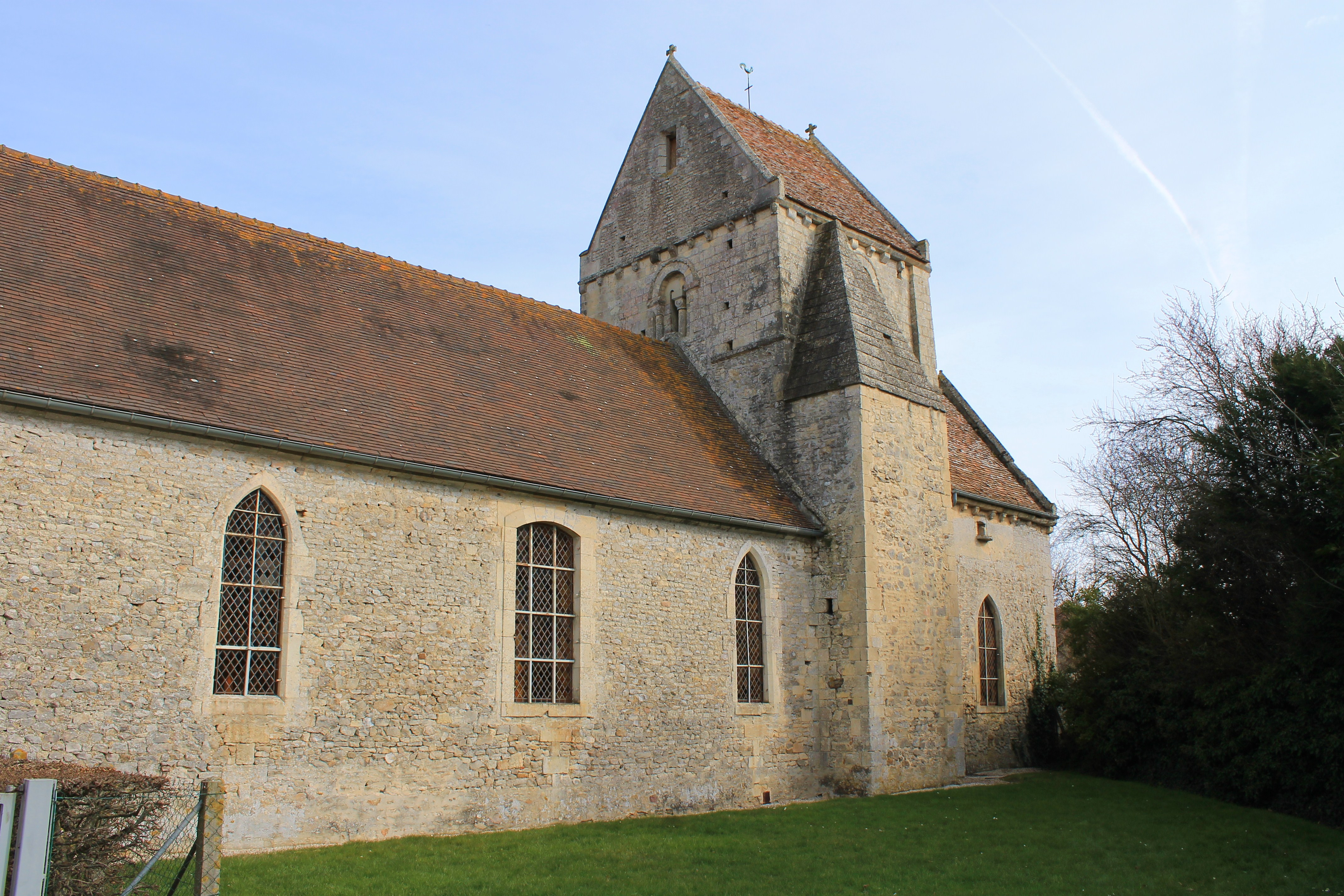
- The church in Bretteville-le-Rabet

- Coat of arms
- Location of Bretteville-le-Rabet
- Location within France Location within Normandy
- Coordinates: 49°01′33″N 0°15′29″W
- Country: France
- Region: Normandy
- Department: Calvados
- Arrondissement: Caen
- Canton: Le Hom
- Intercommunality: Cingal-Suisse Normande

Government
  - Mayor (2020–2026): Robert Brard
- Area^{1}: 4.53 km^{2} (1.75 sq mi)
- Elevation: 100 m (330 ft)
- Highest elevation: 125 m (410 ft)
- Lowest elevation: 75 m (246 ft)
- Population (2023): 297
  - Density: 65.6/km^{2} (170/sq mi)
- Time zone: UTC+01:00 (CET)
  - Summer (DST): UTC+02:00 (CEST)
- INSEE/Postal code: 14097 /14190
- ^{1} French Land Register data, which excludes lakes, ponds, glaciers > 1 km^{2} (0.386 sq mi or 247 acres) and river estuaries.

Bretteville-le-Rabet (French pronunciation: [bʁɛtvil lə ʁabɛ]) is a commune in the Calvados department in the Normandy region in northwestern France.

== Population ==
Historical population
Year	Pop.	±% p.a.
1968	116	—
1975	118	+0.24%
1982	133	+1.72%
1990	175	+3.49%
1999	193	+1.09%
2007	257	+3.64%
2012	263	+0.46%
2017	305	+3.01%
2023	297	−0.44%
Source: INSEE

== Points of Interest ==
=== National heritage sites ===
- Eglise Saint-Lo - a twelfth century church listed as a monument in 1928.

== See also ==
- Communes of the Calvados department
