= Adolph B. Spreckels =

American businessman (1857–1924)

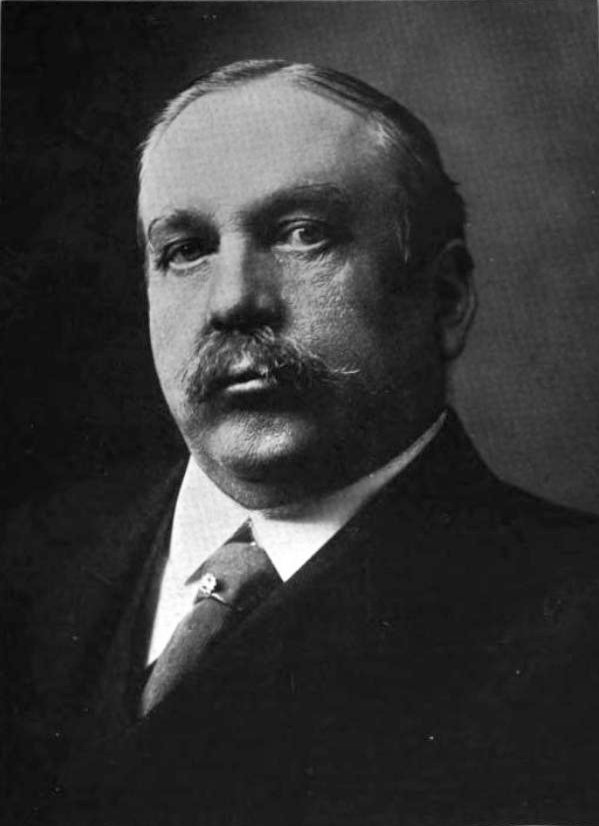
- Born: Adolph Bernard Spreckels; January 5, 1857; San Francisco, California, US
- Died: June 28, 1924 (aged 67); San Francisco, California, US
- Burial place: Cypress Lawn Memorial Park
- Occupation: Businessperson
- Known for: Spreckels Sugar Company; California Palace of the Legion of Honor
- Spouse: Alma de Bretteville Spreckels
- Parent(s): Claus Spreckels; Anna Christina Mangels
- Relatives: John D. Spreckels, Claus A. Spreckels, Rudolph Spreckels (brothers)

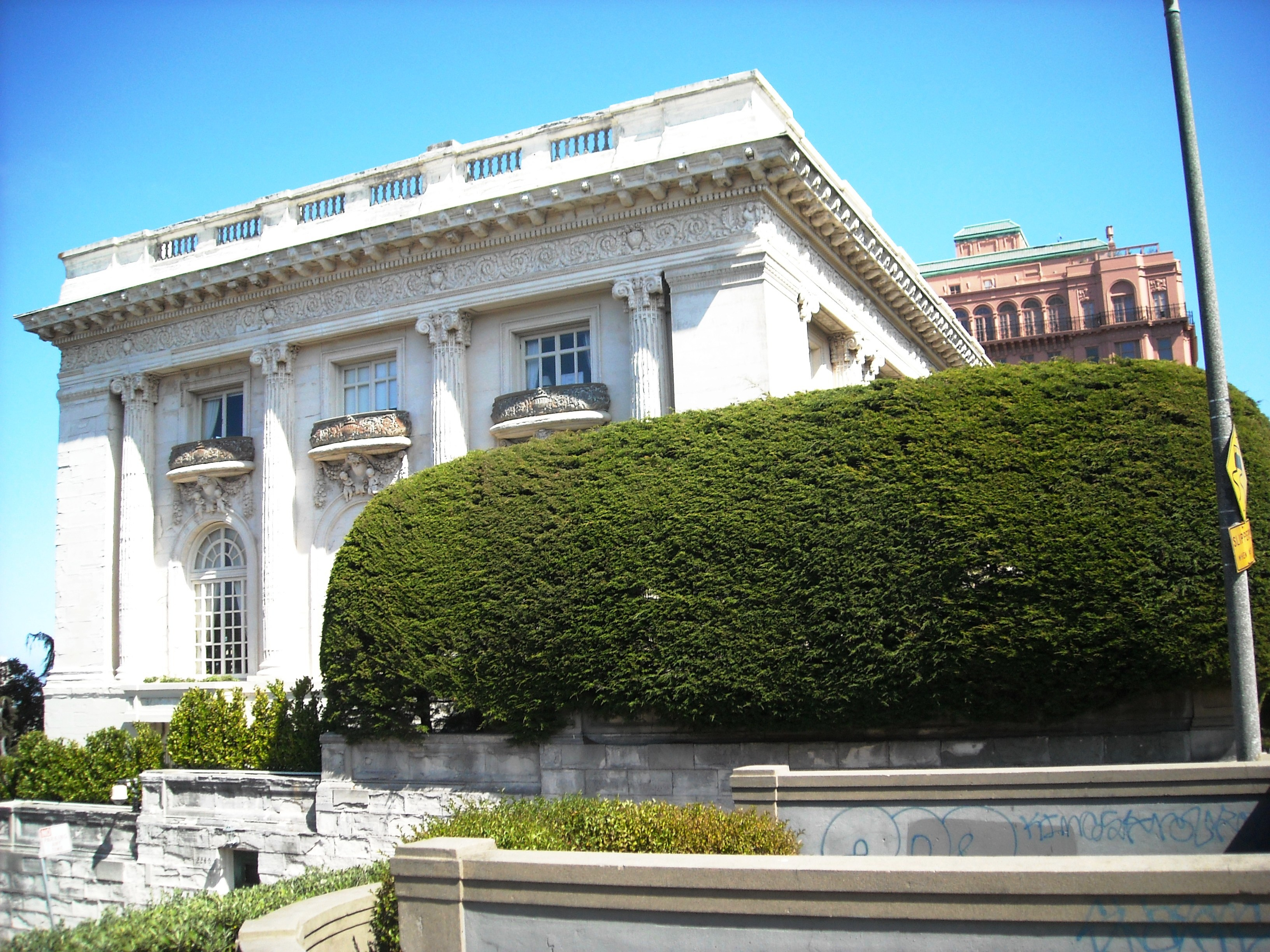
The Spreckels Mansion in San Francisco

Adolph Bernard Spreckels (January 5, 1857 – June 28, 1924) was a California businessman who ran the Spreckels Sugar Company and who donated the California Palace of the Legion of Honor art museum to the city of San Francisco in 1924. His wife, Alma, was called the "great grandmother of San Francisco". His 1912 mansion is in Pacific Heights and is San Francisco Landmark #197.

== Life and career ==
Spreckels was born in San Francisco, California. His parents were Anna Christina Mangels and Claus Spreckels, founder of the Spreckels Sugar Company. At the age of 12, Adolph studied abroad in Hanover, Germany, for two years, returning to San Francisco to finish his studies.

When the company was founded in 1881, he was named a vice-president. Spreckels succeeded his father as company president upon the latter's death in 1908. In 1884, he shot Michael de Young, the editor of the San Francisco Chronicle, over negative coverage of his family's business. This act made people aware of the unchecked privilege of the wealthy elite in the late 19th century. Spreckels pleaded temporary insanity to the charge of attempted murder and was acquitted.

The California Palace of the Legion of Honor was championed by his wife, and paid for from the Spreckels fortune. It was merged with the M. H. de Young Memorial Museum in 1972 and became the Fine Arts Museums of San Francisco.

Spreckels was president of the San Francisco and San Mateo Electric Railway, vice-president of the Western Sugar Company and the Oceanic Steamship Company, and was a director of the Sunset Monarch Company. He served as a San Francisco Park Commissioner and was involved in the development of Golden Gate Park. Spreckels Lake is named after him. Spreckels Organ Pavilion in San Diego's Balboa Park, housing the largest outdoor pipe organ in the world, was built by Spreckels and his brother, John. John commissioned Spreckels Organ in the Palace of the Legion of Honor in tribute to Adolph, who died before it was completed.

== Thoroughbred racing ==
Spreckels owned and bred race horses, including Morvich, the first California-bred horse to win the Kentucky Derby in 1922, in a time of 2:04.60.

== Family ==
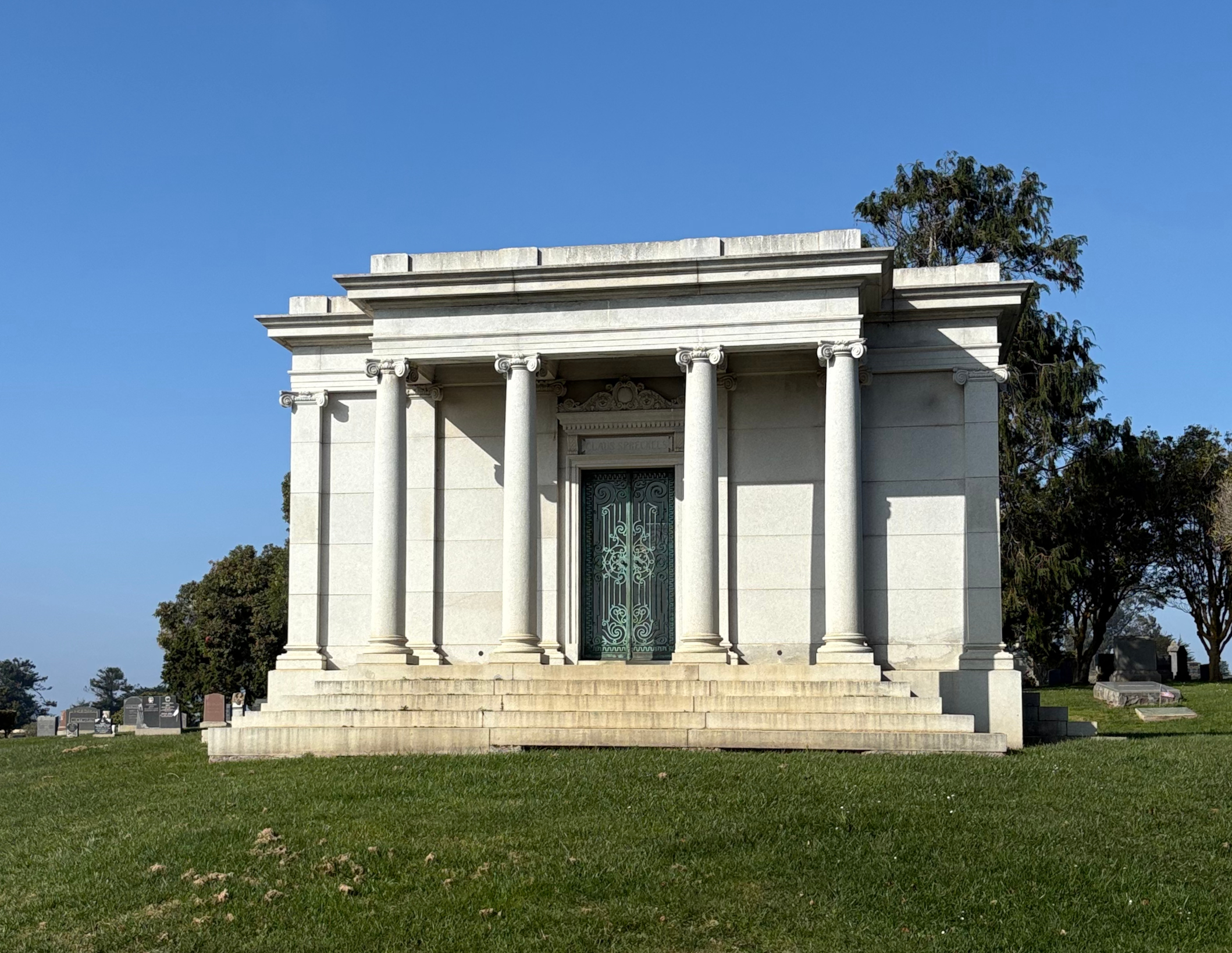
Spreckels Mausoleum at Cypress Lawn Memorial Park

He and Alma de Bretteville were married on May 11, 1908, after a five-year courtship. They had three children, daughter, Alma Emma, son, Adolph Bernard Jr., and daughter, Dorothy Constance. His grandson, Adolph Bernard Spreckels III, better known as Bunker Spreckels, would become a well-known surfer in the 1960s and 1970s.

After the birth of his last daughter, Spreckels' health began to deteriorate due to syphilis he had contracted before his marriage. He had kept the disease secret from his wife, but during most of their marriage it had been in a latent, non-contagious state. Spreckels died in 1924 from pneumonia, and was interred at Cypress Lawn Memorial Park in Colma.

== Spreckels Mansion ==
The family's mansion, located at 2080 Washington Street in the Pacific Heights neighborhood of San Francisco, was designed by George A. Applegarth and Kenneth A. MacDonald Jr. in the French Baroque style. The chateau was designated as San Francisco Landmark #197 on June 9, 1990.
