= Anjac =

Anjac may refer to:

- Anjac Fashion Buildings company, owner of several Anjac Fashion Buildings, in Los Angeles, United States
- Ayya Nadar Janaki Ammal College in Sivakasi, Tamil Nadu, India
