= Western Costume Building =

Historic building in downtown Los Angeles

- U.S. Historic district – Contributing property
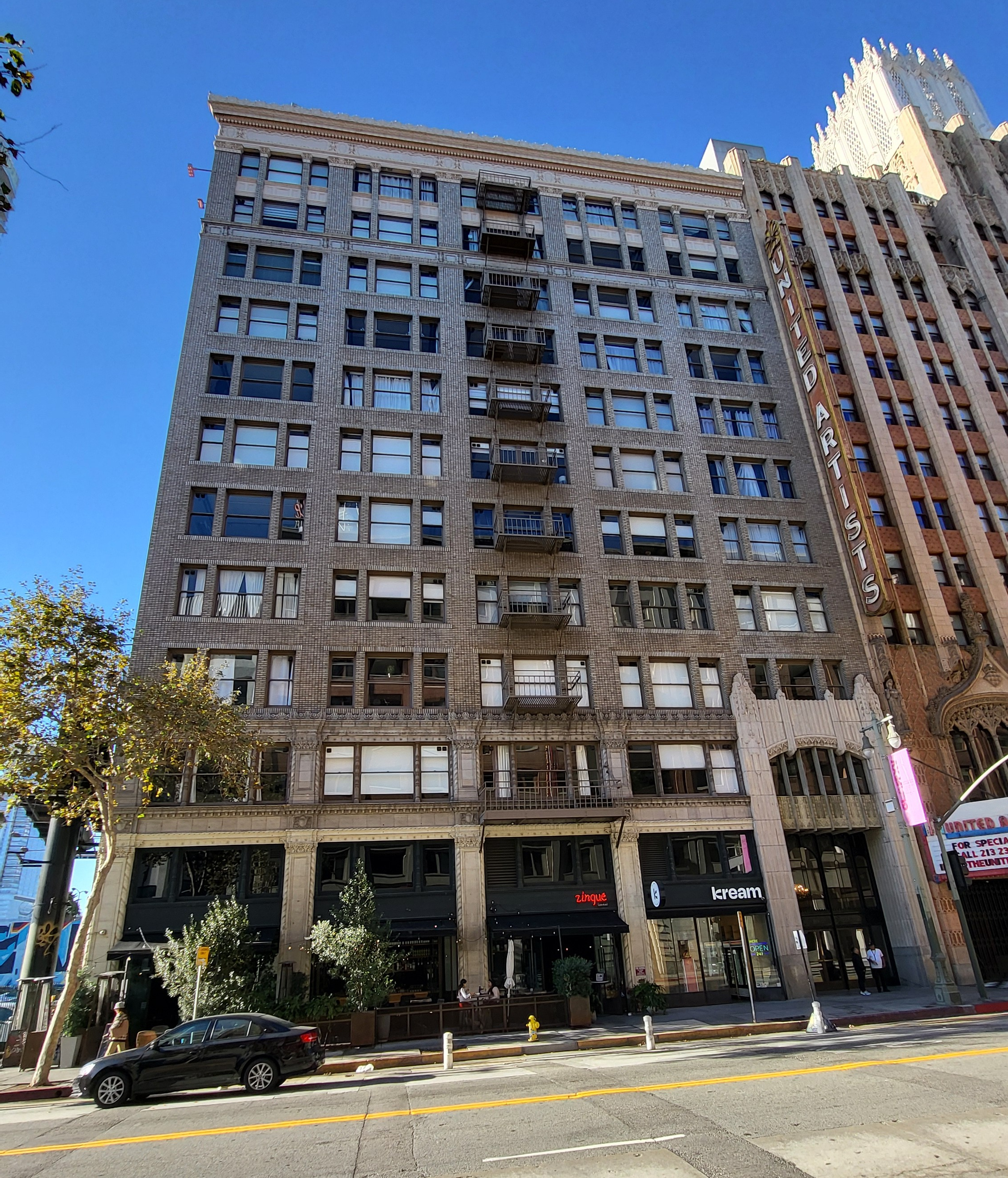
- The building in 2025

- Location within the Los Angeles metropolitan area
- Location: 939-947 S. Broadway, Los Angeles, California
- Coordinates: 34°02′30″N 118°15′26″W
- Built: 1924-1925
- Architect: Kenneth A. MacDonald Jr.
- Architectural style: Renaissance Revival; Gothic Revival imagery Art Deco forms and massing
- Part of: Broadway Theater and Commercial District (ID02000330)
- Designated CP: April 12, 2002

Western Costume Building, also known as 939 South Broadway Building, 939 Broadway Lofts, and Anjac Fashion Building, is a historic eleven-story highrise located at 939-947 S. Broadway in the Broadway Theater District in the historic core of downtown Los Angeles. The building originally housed Western Costume and an estimated 95-99% of all Hollywood film productions from 1923 to 1932 costumed through the company in this building.

== History ==
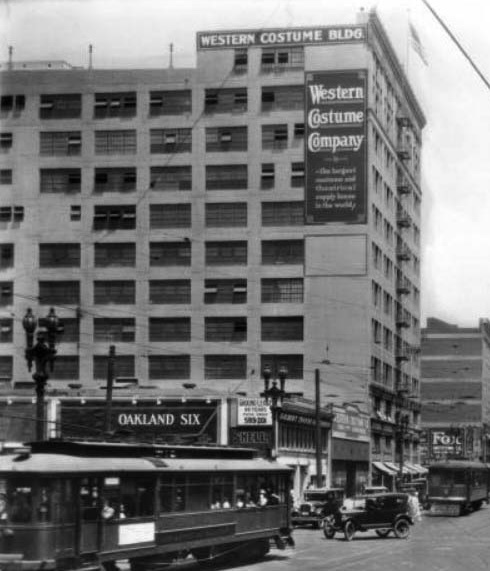
The building in 1926

Western Costume Building, built for the Ninth and Broadway Company in 1924–1925, was designed by Kenneth A. MacDonald Jr., the architect also responsible for the nearby Broadway-Spring Arcade.

The building originally housed Western Costume, who billed themselves as "the Largest Costume and Rental Supply House in the World." An estimated 95-99% of all Hollywood film productions from 1923 to 1932 costumed through the company in this building. Prior to 1923, the company was located across the street in the Broadway Leasehold Building and post-1932, the company moved next to Paramount Studios on Melrose Avenue. Post-Western Costume, this building was occupied by garment manufacturing.

Western Costume Building was not listed in the National Register of Historic Places's Broadway Theater and Commercial District when it was first created in 1979, but it was included when the district was expanded in 2002.

The building was bought by Barry Shy in 2016, and in 2018, he completed a conversion of the building to residential.

== Architecture and design ==
Western Costume Building is built of brick with a terra cotta facade. The building features a Renaissance Revival design with a two-story Gothic Revival entrance overlaid on the building's northernmost bay. The primary facade features five bays in total. Other aspects of the design include:

- a segmented archway, emphasized by a chevron molding and a fluted spandrel, flanked by fluted piers which taper into triangles embellished with scroll designs.
- elaborate metalwork that frames the one-story door, the four round-headed windows in the transom, and the arched second story window.
- three windows, separated by colonette mullions, in the remaining second-story bays
- panelled piers, edged by spiraled moldings, that define each bay and are accented at the level of the first story frieze and shields
- un-ornamented brick that separates the windows on the third through ninth stories
- a two-story capital defined by continuous piers and mullions with spandrels between stories
- Ionic capitals that crown the piers
- a second frieze, topped by cornice and antefixes, that terminates the building

The integrity of the building is high and the building itself is in good condition.

== Filming location ==
Several silent films shot at the Western Costume Building, including Old Wallop and Laurel and Hardy's Liberty.

== See also ==
- List of contributing properties in the Broadway Theater and Commercial District
- Anjac Fashion Building (disambiguation), for other Anjac Fashion Buildings
