= Spreckels Mansion =

Spreckels Mansion may refer to:

- Spreckels Mansion (San Francisco), San Francisco, California, home of sugar magnate Adolph B. Spreckels and wife Alma Spreckels
- Spreckels Mansion (Coronado, California), home of industrialist John D. Spreckels
