= Sonesta =

Sonesta may refer to:

- Sonesta International Hotels

- The Clift Royal Sonesta Hotel, a hotel in San Francisco
- The Chase Park Plaza Hotel, a Royal Sonesta Hotel in St. Louis, MO

- Sonesta, a 1972 built residential area in Malahide, Co. Dublin, Ireland

== See also ==
- Search for "Sonesta" in Wikipedia
