= Broadway Leasehold Building =

Historic building in Los Angeles, CA

- U.S. Historic district – Contributing property
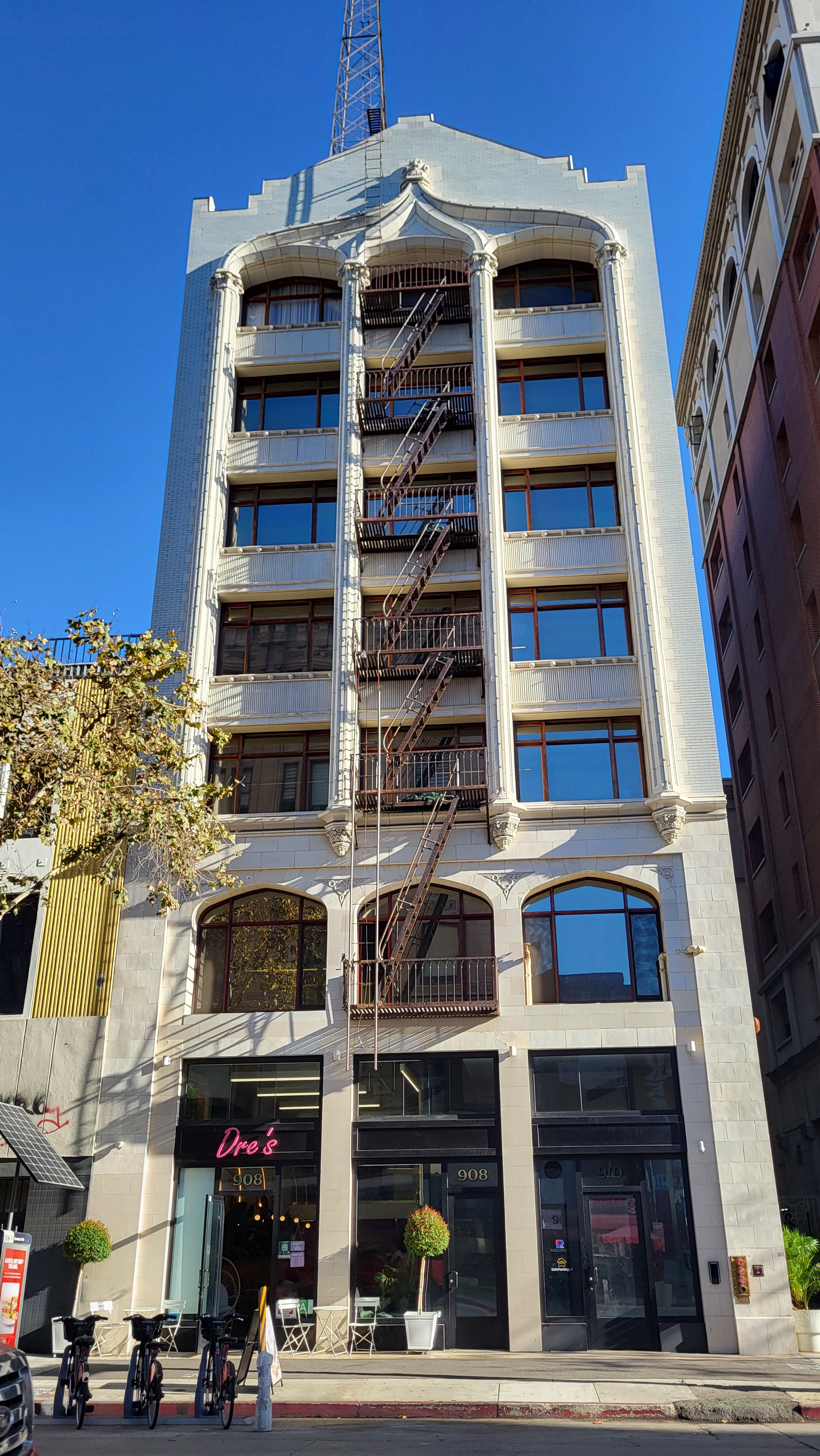
- The building in 2025

- Location within the Los Angeles metropolitan area
- Location: 908-910 S. Broadway, Los Angeles, California
- Coordinates: 34°02′31″N 118°15′22″W
- Built: 1914
- Architect: Unknown or Meyer & Holler or an employee of theirs
- Architectural style: Gothic Revival
- Part of: Broadway Theater and Commercial District (ID02000330)
- Designated CP: April 12, 2002

Broadway Leasehold Building, also known as L.L. Burns Western Costume Building, Sparkle Building or Sparkle Factory, is a historic seven-story building located at 908-910 S. Broadway in the Broadway Theater District in the historic core of downtown Los Angeles. The building is best known for its 2010 Banksy mural and as the filming location where Harold Lloyd scaled and dangled from a clock in the 1923 film Safety Last!.

== History ==
Broadway Leasehold Building, built in 1914, was originally designed to house street-level retail with offices for Leasehold Company above. According to the United States Department of the Interior, the architect is unknown, while other sources cite the architect as an employee of Milwaukee Building Company/Meyer and Holler and even more sources cite Meyer and Holler directly.

During prohibition, Broadway Leasehold Building's basement housed several speakeasies, and the building was also home to Western Costume until 1923, when the company moved across the street to the Western Costume Building.

Broadway Leasehold Building was not listed in the National Register of Historic Places's Broadway Theater and Commercial District when it was first created in 1979, but it was included when the district was expanded in 2002.

In 2007, Alfonso Campos and Tarina Tarantino bought the building for $4 million ($6.21 million in 2025). They then renovated and turned it into Tarantino's jewelry company headquarters, dubbed the Sparkle Factory. The total cost of the renovation, which took more than a decade, was $1.8 million ($2.52 million in 2025).

In 2014, the building was awarded $103,940 ($141,358 in 2025) through the Bringing Back Broadway initiative to spotlight its façade columns and outline its architectural crown.

In 2022, local lawyer Farid Yaghoubtil bought the building at auction for $8.5 million ($9.35 million in 2025), $21.5 million less than the sellers hoped for.

== Architecture and design ==
Broadway Leasehold Building is built of reinforced concrete and brick with a primary facade clad in terra cotta and glazed brick. The building was designed in the Gothic Revival style, with features that include:

- a defining wide open arch in the primary facade that encompasses three bays of wood-frame, mostly-fixed, deep-set sash windows
- faceted colonettes that define the window grid and are each topped by a capital, above which they curve together to join at the top of the ogee arch
- a segmental-arched header at the top window opening of each bay
- unornamented spandrel panels except for string course detail along the bottom
- a metal fire escape affixed to the central bay
- a gabled parapet wall that terminates the facade

The building's ground-floor exterior has been altered and obscured by signage, but the upper-stories are intact. Overall, the building is in good condition.

== In popular culture ==
=== Filming location ===
The rooftop of the Broadway Leasehold Building was where Harold Lloyd scaling and dangling from the arms of a clock in Safety Last! was filmed, as was the last shot of that film. A similar stunt in Hold Your Breath was also filmed on this building's rooftop.

=== Banksy mural ===
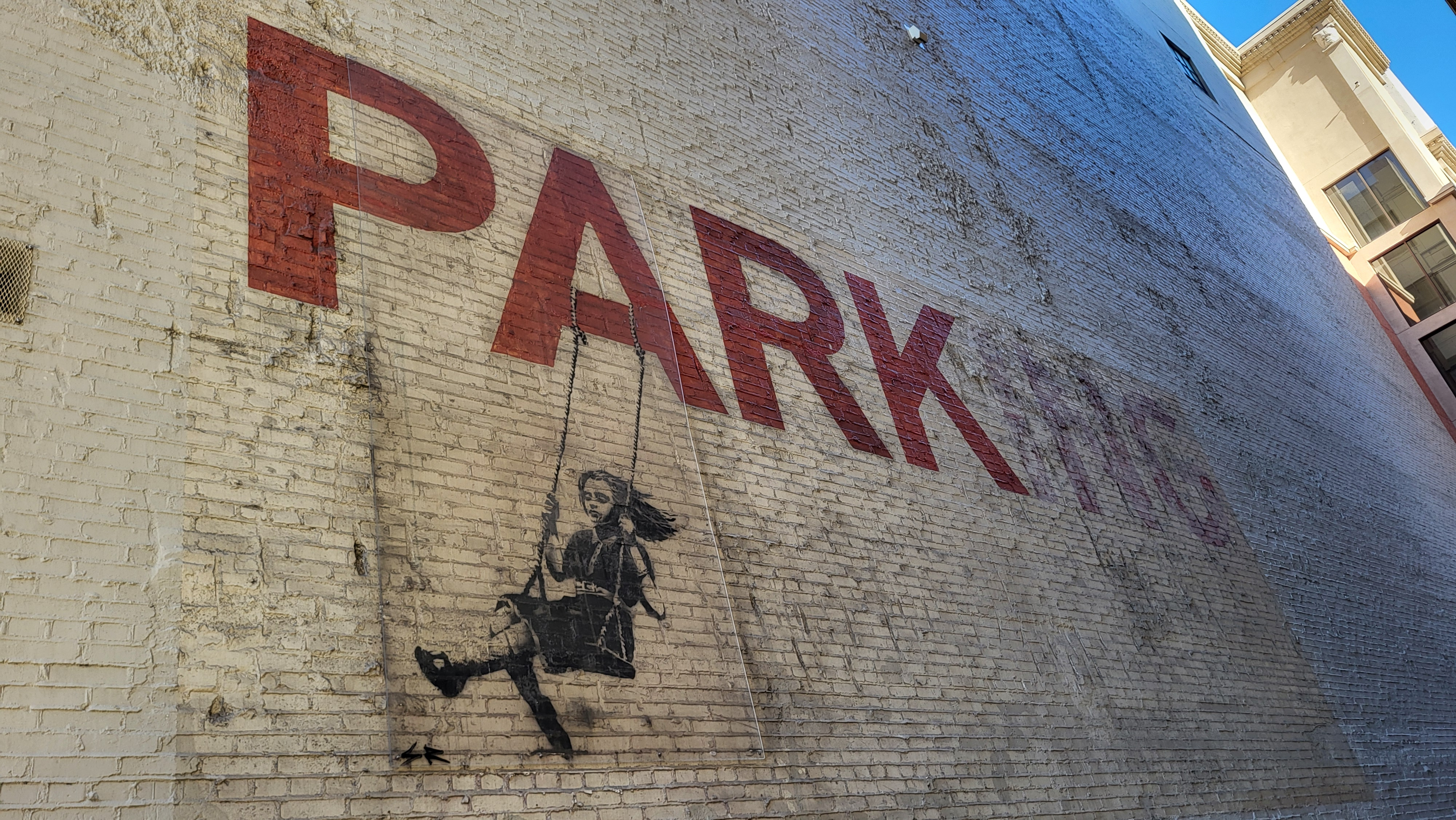
'Girl on a Swing'

In 2010, a 13-foot (4.0 m) by 33-foot (10 m) mural was painted on the building's southwestern exterior. Titled Girl on a Swing, the mural is believed to have been created by Banksy, who was attending the premiere of Exit Through The Gift Shop at the nearby Los Angeles Theatre around the time of the mural's creation.

== See also ==
- List of contributing properties in the Broadway Theater and Commercial District
