= Spreckels Organ =

Pipe organ designed by Ernest M. Skinner

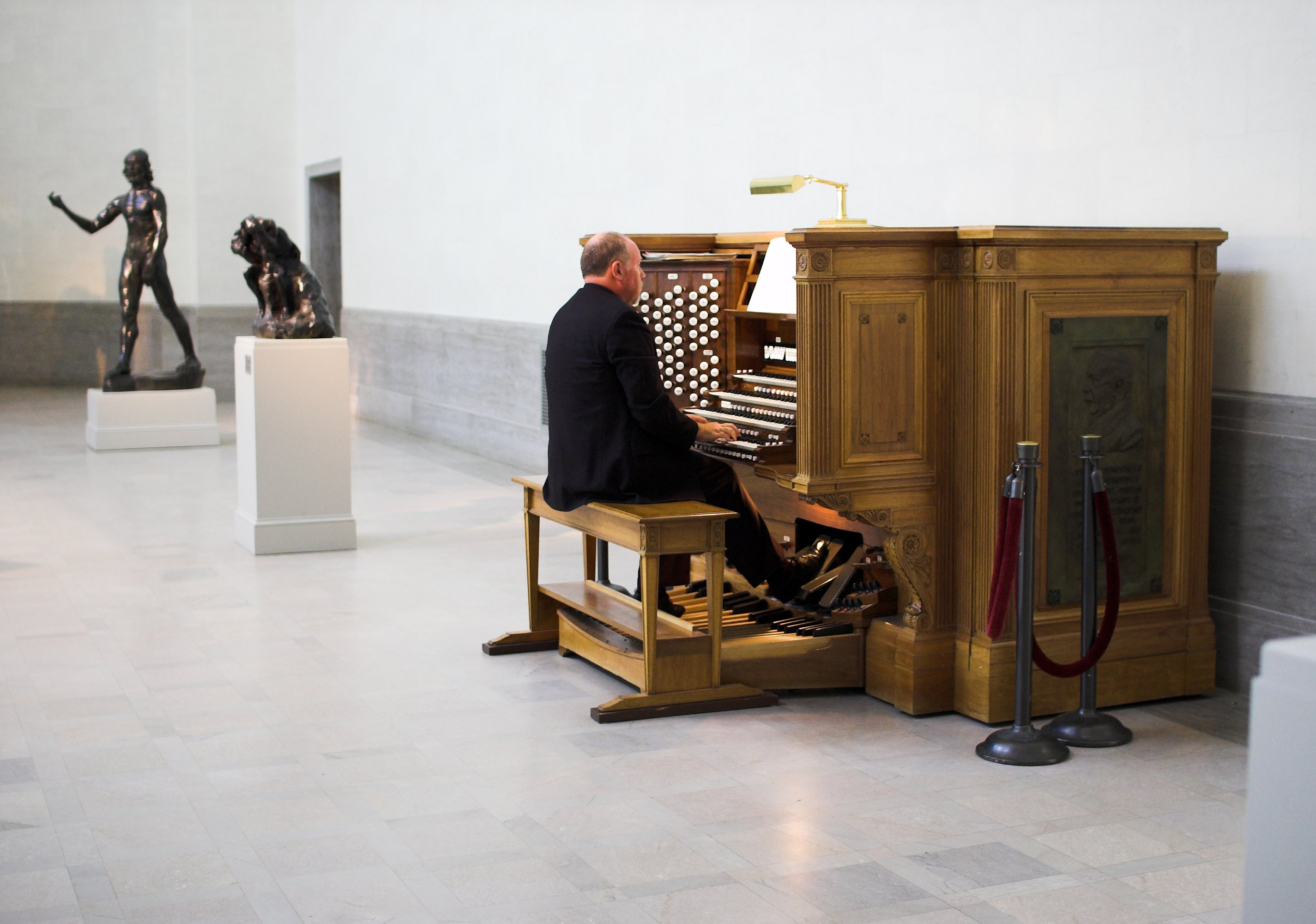
Console of the Spreckels Organ

The Spreckels Organ is a pipe organ that was designed by Ernest M. Skinner. It was installed in 1924 at the Legion of Honor museum in San Francisco, California. Public performances are held on Saturdays, 4:00–4:45 pm.

Philanthropist John D. Spreckels commissioned the organ's manufacture. A commemorative plaque on the right side of the console states: "John D. Spreckels has generously given the organ in this temple for the pleasure of those who, like himself, are lovers of music AD MCMXXIV." Spreckels donated the organ as a tribute to his brother Adolph, who was dying from syphilis. Adolph died before the organ was completed.

== Setting ==
The organ is located in the museum's Rodin gallery. It was designed to blend into the museum's structure; its 4,500 pipes are not visible to visitors. The ceiling of the gallery is canvas so that the organ can be heard throughout the gallery and museum; the canvas ceiling is painted as a trompe-l'œil to resemble a marble apse.

== Organ features and materials ==
For definitions and further information, see: List of pipe organ stops

In keeping with the Legion of Honor's majestic edifice, the organ incorporates rare woods: ebony, mahogany, walnut and ivory keys and stops. Three high pressure wind turbines, totaling 48 horsepower (36 kilowatts), supply wind for the organ's pipes and pneumatic system. The instrument includes pneumatic percussion instruments (bass drum, castanets, Chinese block, crash cymbal, snare drum, gong snare drum and tambourine triangle), a thunder pedal, and large tubular chimes.

The organ has four manuals, 107 stops and 4,500 pipes in 63 ranks. The instrument comprises a great organ, swell organ, choir organ (featuring a 16-foot contra dulciana), choir organ echo, solo organ, solo organ echo, an arch organ outfitted with an 8-foot arch clarion, a 64-foot gravissima and a 32-foot bourdon profunda.

Like other Skinner organs, the instrument was designed to replicate an orchestra.

== See also ==
- Spreckels Organ Pavilion, San Diego, California
