= Fine Arts Museums of San Francisco =

Public arts institution in San Francisco, California

Coordinates: 37°46′17.4″N 122°28′07.3″W

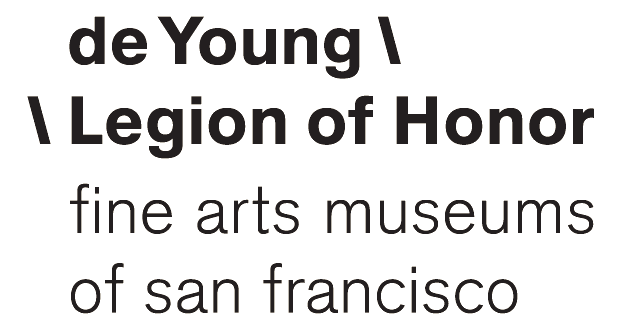
FAMSF logo, 2024

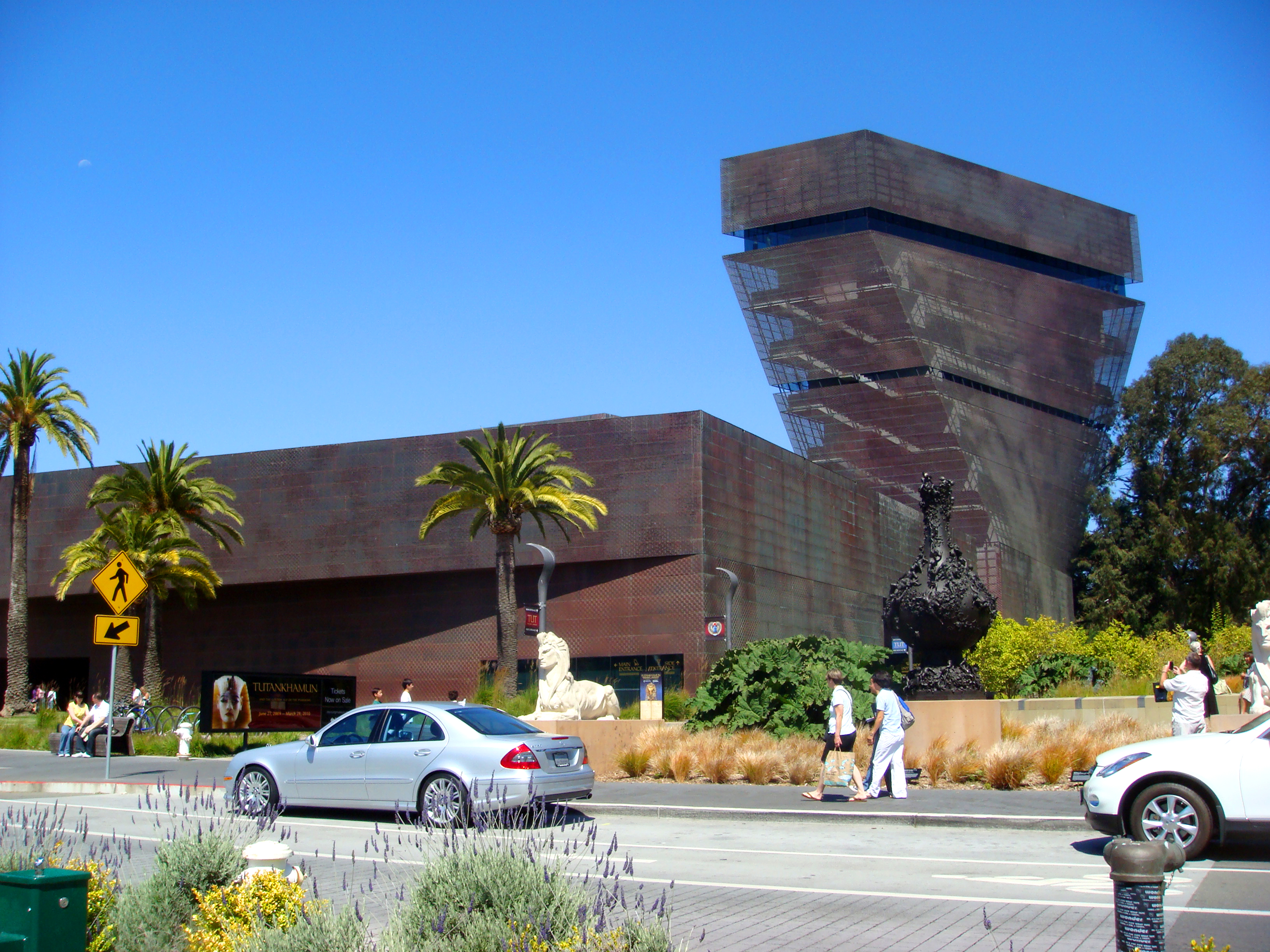
The de Young Museum, part of the Fine Arts Museums of San Francisco

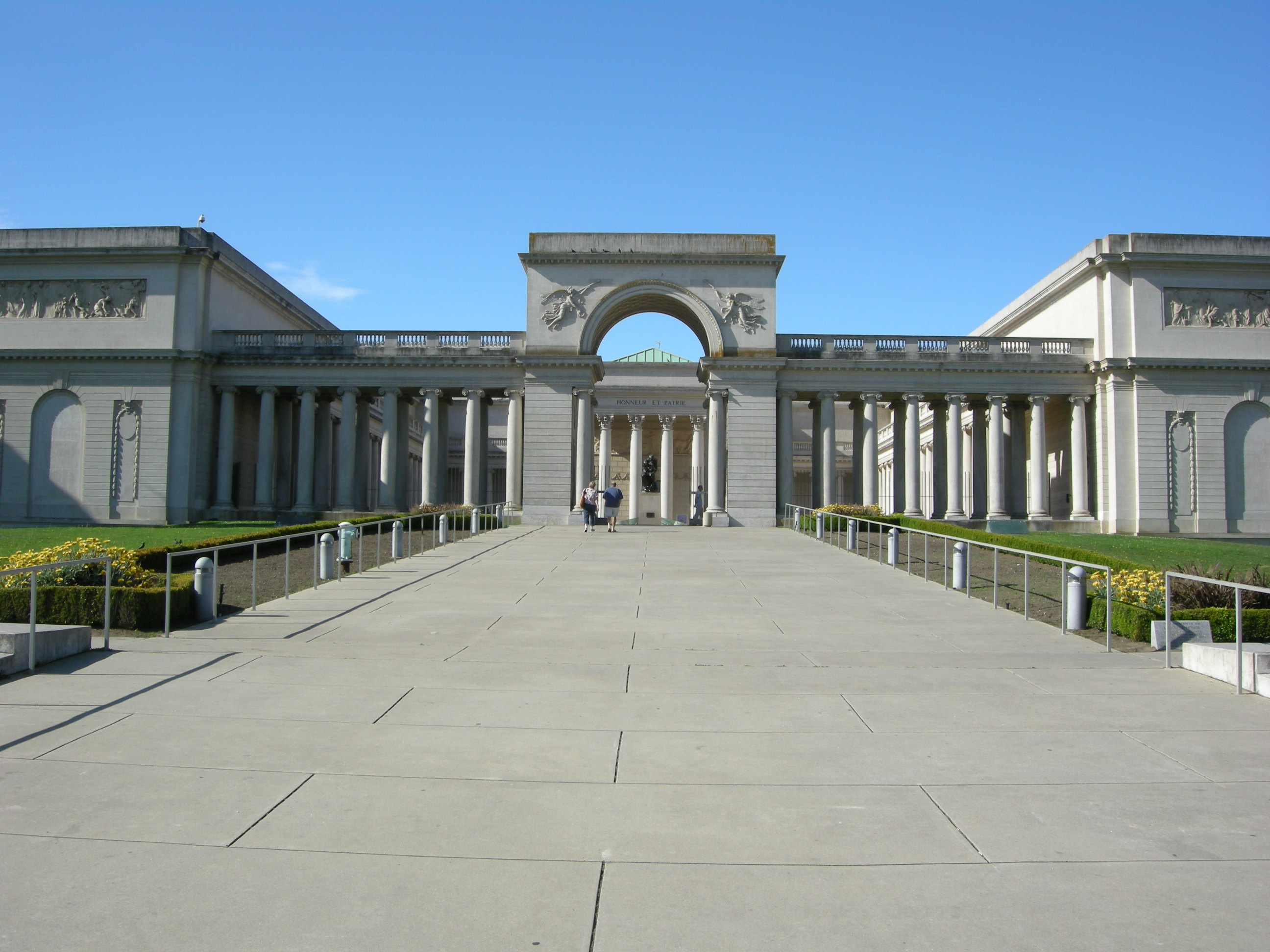
The Legion of Honor, part of the Fine Arts Museums of San Francisco

The Fine Arts Museums of San Francisco (FAMSF), comprising the de Young Museum in Golden Gate Park and the Legion of Honor in Lincoln Park, is the largest public arts institution in the city of San Francisco. FAMSF's combined attendance was 1,158,264 visitors in 2022, making it the fifth most attended art institution in the United States. In 2024, the two combined museums were ranked 15th in The Washington Post's list of the best art museums in the U.S.

Opened in 1895, the de Young is home to American art from the 17th century through today, textile arts and costumes, African art, Oceanic art, arts of the Americas, and contemporary art. Opened in 1924, the Legion of Honor showcases European painting, sculpture, and decorative arts, ancient art, graphic arts, and contemporary art in dialogue with its historical collections and Beaux-Arts style building. In total the collection holds 130,000 objects.

== History ==
In 1931, the two museums were informally united for the first time when Lloyd LaPage Rollins took over the directorship of the Legion of Honor and was simultaneously appointed the first director of the de Young. In 1972, under the leadership of Ian McKibbin White, the two museums were formally merged to create the Fine Arts Museums of San Francisco (FAMSF). At that time, the permanent collections were reorganized and distinct curatorial departments were created.

== Leadership ==
- 1924-1930: Cornelia B. Sage Quinton (Legion of Honor)
- 1931-1933: Lloyd LaPage Rollins (Legion of Honor and de Young)
- 1933-1939: Dr. Walter Heil (Legion of Honor)
- 1939-1961: Dr. Walter Heil (de Young)
- 1939 -1968: Thomas Carr Howe (Legion of Honor)
- 1970-1987: Ian Mckibbin White (FAMSF)
- 1987-2005: Harry S. Parker
- 2006-2011: John E. Buchanan
- 2013-2015: Colin. B Bailey
- 2016-2018: Max Hollein
- 2018 – Present: Thomas P. Campbell

== Facilities ==
=== de Young Museum ===
The de Young originated from the California Midwinter International Exposition of 1894 and was established as the Memorial Museum. Thirty years later, it was renamed in honor of newspaper publisher Michael Henry de Young, a longtime champion of the museum. The present copper-clad landmark building, designed by Herzog & de Meuron, opened in October 2005. Walter Hood was commissioned to design the landscaping and garden courts for the new building.

=== Legion of Honor ===
The Legion of Honor was inspired by the French pavilion, a replica of the Palais de la Légion d'Honneur in Paris, at San Francisco's Panama–Pacific International Exposition of 1915. The museum opened in 1924 in the Beaux Arts–style building designed by George Applegarth on a bluff overlooking the Golden Gate. In 1995, the Legion of Honor opened an expansion designed by architects Edward Larrabee Barnes and Mark Cavagnero. It increased the museum's square footage by 42 percent, including the addition of seven additional special exhibition galleries.
