= Ninth and Broadway Building =

Building in Los Angeles, California

- U.S. Historic district – Contributing property
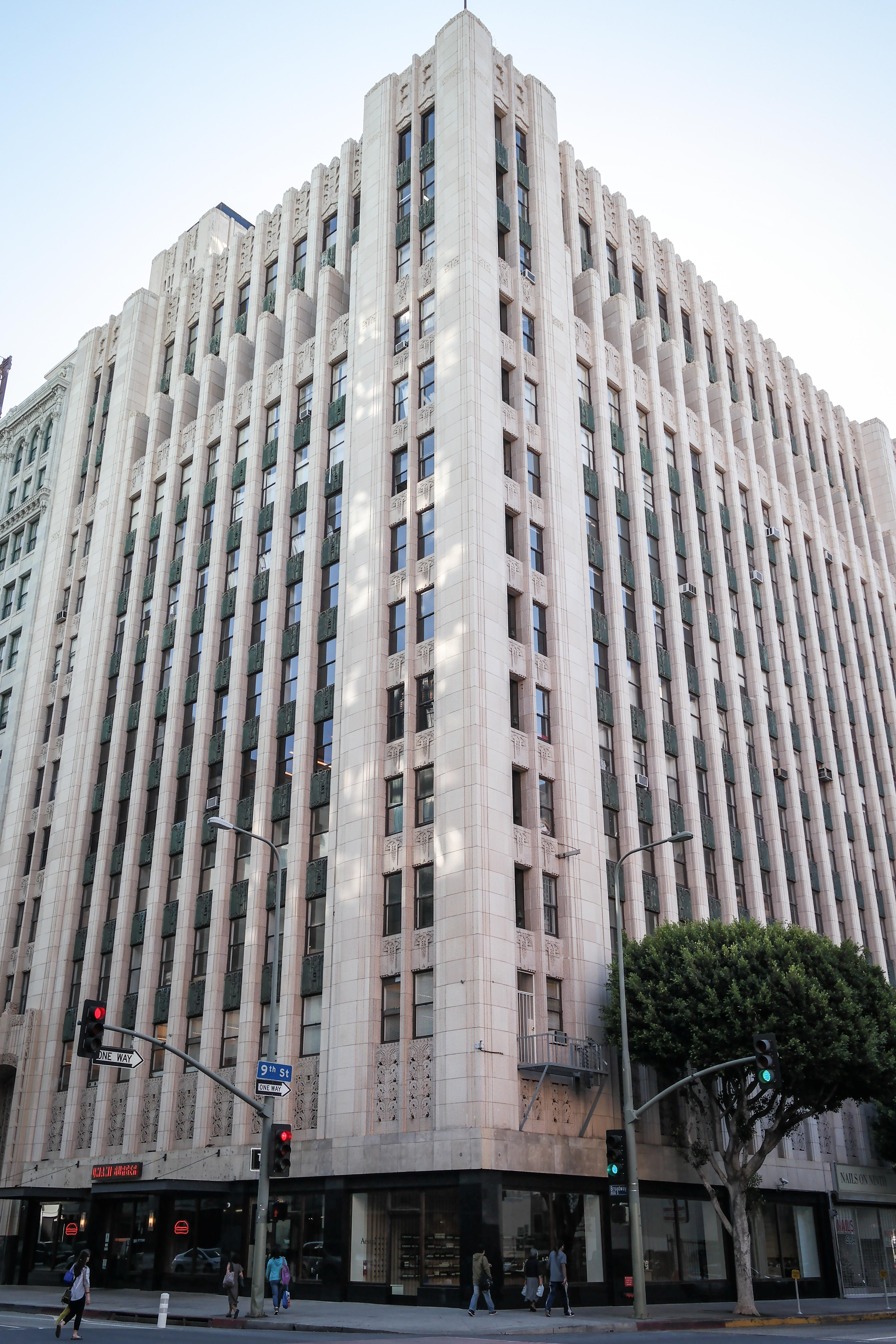
- The building in 2014

- Location within the Los Angeles metropolitan area
- Location: 850 S. Broadway and 127 W. 9th Street, Los Angeles, California
- Coordinates: 34°02′33″N 118°15′21″W
- Built: 1929
- Architect: Claude Beelman
- Architectural style: Zigzag Moderne
- Part of: Broadway Theater and Commercial District (ID79000484)
- Designated CP: May 9, 1979

Ninth and Broadway Building, also known as Anjac Fashion Building, is a historic thirteen-story highrise located at 850 S. Broadway and 127 W. 9th Street in the Broadway Theater District in the historic core of downtown Los Angeles.

== History ==
Ninth and Broadway Building, built in 1929, was designed by Claude Beelman, the architect responsible for many Los Angeles landmarks, including the Eastern Columbia Building located at the same intersection as this one. This building was originally built as lofts and offices with ground-floor retail.

In 1979, the Broadway Theater and Commercial District was added to the National Register of Historic Places, with Ninth and Broadway Building listed as a contributing property in the district.

In 2014, the building was awarded $69,293 ($94,238 in 2025) to illuminate its Broadway-facing second floor decorative panels and to upgrade the decorative arch lighting above its Broadway entrance.

== Architecture and design ==
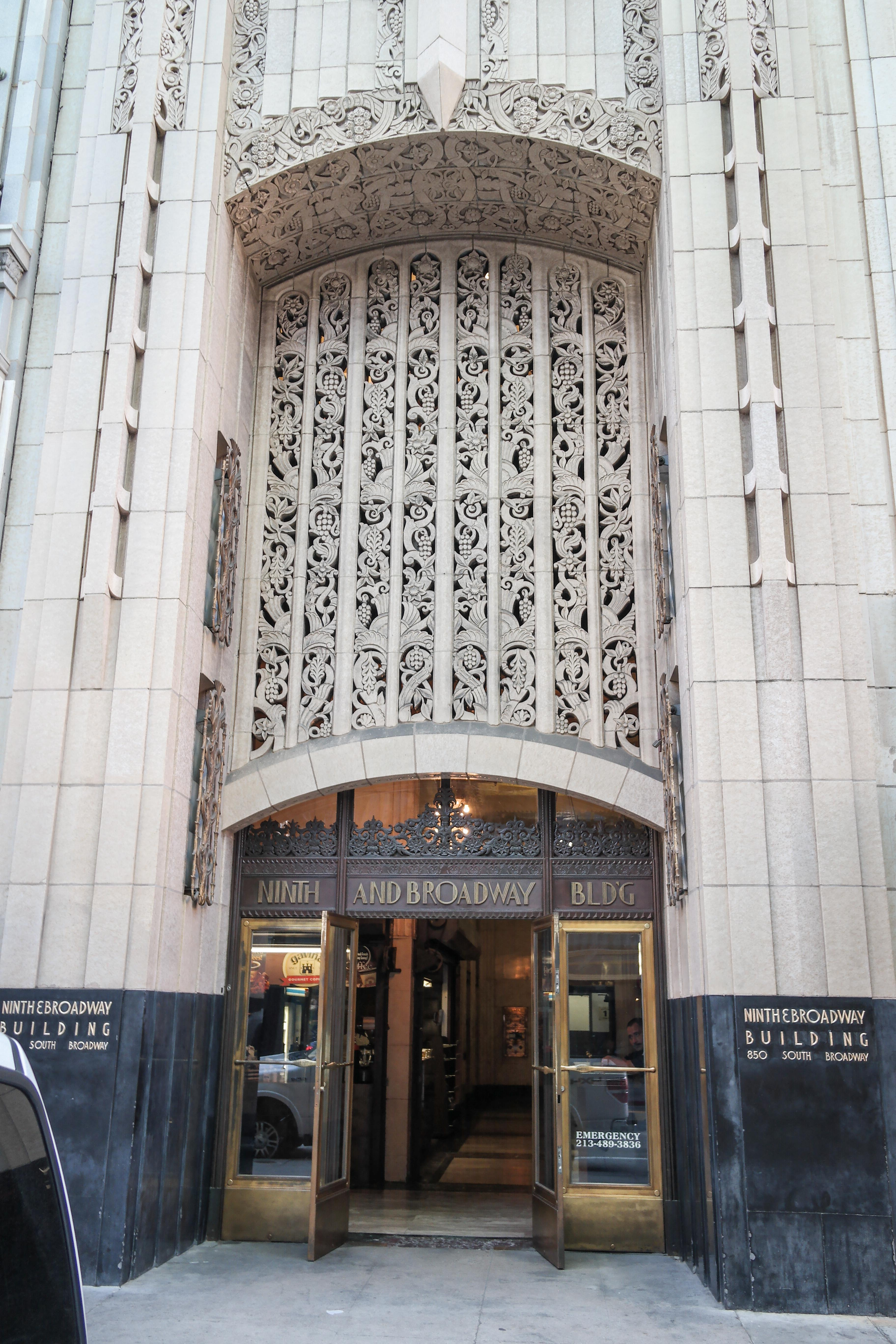
The building's main entrance

Ninth and Broadway Building is made of concrete inside a steel frame and features a terra cotta facade. The building is styled in the Zigzag Moderne style with an imposing sense of verticality. Building features include:

- a two-story recessed entrance with heavy piers capped by a segmental arch
- a second segmental arch above the entrance doors that serves as the base for an elongated panel of filigree ornament in a lush grapevine design
- a sheathed and textured tan-colored body that resembles stone
- vertical massing with a few shallow setbacks near the roofline
- an attic level with a series of setbacks and grapevine panels set between abstract, geometric-design, recessed window strips.

Inside, the building has tiered metal grilles on either side of the entry and the lobby has the building's original elevator doors and cabs.

== In popular culture ==
Ninth and Broadway Building was featured in the Harold Lloyd film Feet First.

== See also ==
- List of contributing properties in the Broadway Theater and Commercial District
- Anjac Fashion Building (disambiguation), for other Anjac Fashion Buildings
