= Villa de Leon =

Building in Los Angeles County, California, United States

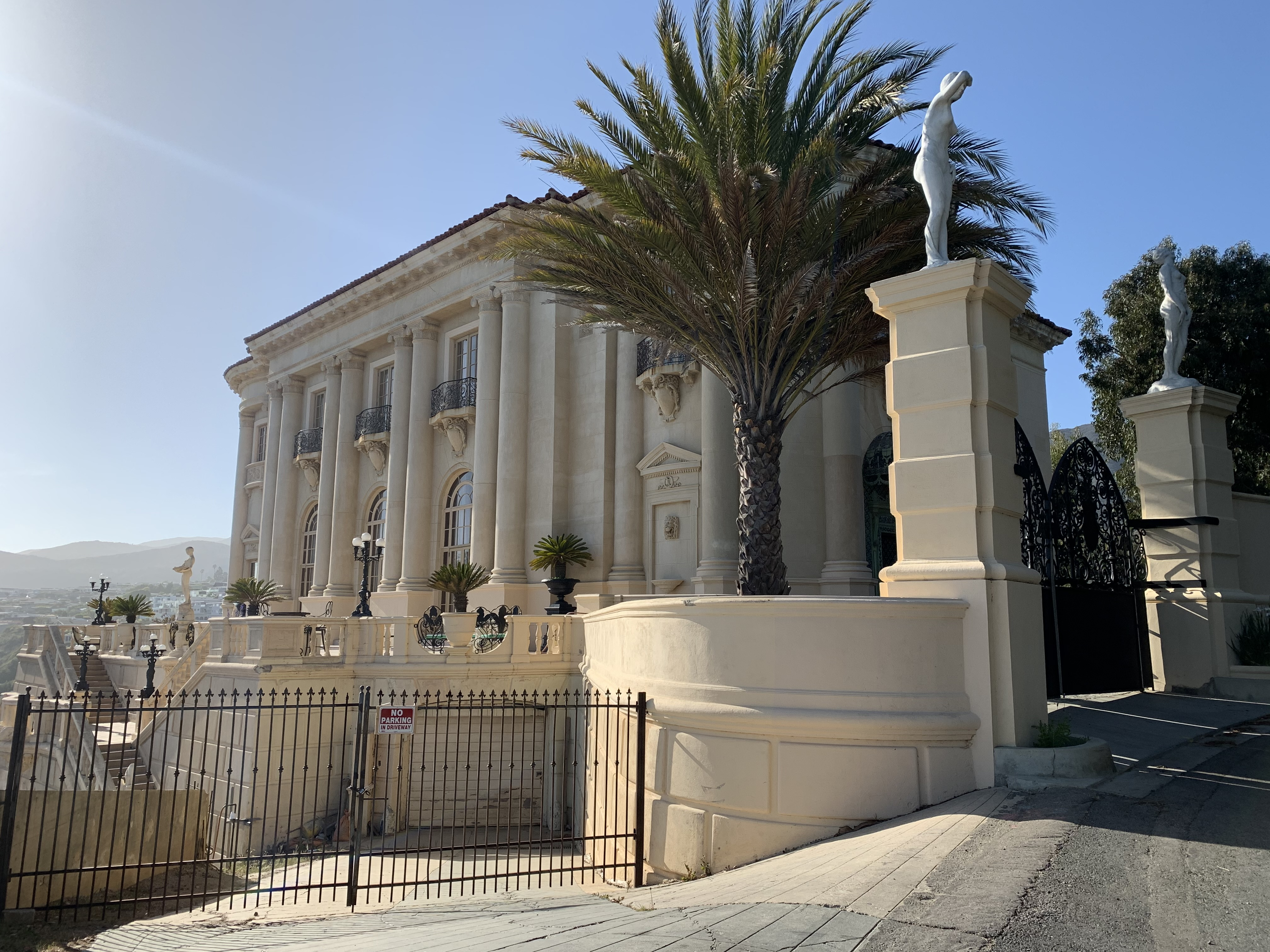

- Location within the Los Angeles metropolitan area

General information
- Status: Completed
- Architectural style: Mediterranean Revival, Beaux-Arts
- Location: 17948 Porto Marina Way, Pacific Palisades, California, United States
- Coordinates: 34.042302°N 118.566501°W
- Construction started: 1926
- Completed: 1926
- Owner: Leon Kauffman (1926-1935)

Technical details
- Floor area: 10,277 ft (3,132 m)

Design and construction
- Architect: Kenneth A. MacDonald Jr.

Villa de Leon, also known as the Kauffman Estate, is a historic 35-room, 10,277 sq ft (954.8 m^{2}) Italian Revival mansion in the Castellemmare neighborhood of Pacific Palisades.

The mansion overlooks Pacific Coast Highway and the Pacific Ocean and is situated in close proximity to the Getty Villa. It was designed by prominent Los Angeles architect Kenneth A. MacDonald Jr. in 1926 for Austrian builder and investor in wool Leon Kauffman and his wife Clemence.

The building has 35 rooms, including 9 bedrooms, 11 bathrooms, a grand salon (32 x 64 ft.), a library, a circular dining room, a butler’s pantry, an elevator and a seven-car garage. The construction price of Villa de Leon was $1 million (equivalent to ~$17 million in 2022) and included a central vacuum, hand-made crystal chandeliers, Italian tiles with gold grouting, imported marbles, hand-carved wooden beams, mahogany paneling from Thailand, wrought-iron gates. The Villa de Leon took about five years to complete.

== In popular culture ==
Villa de Leon was used as a filming location for the 1973 cult classic Blackenstein as Dr Stein's castle-like residence. Many features of the home was shown including the famous grand staircase and various exterior/interior shots which showcase the architecture and period antique furniture. The Villa was also shown in the opening scene of the 1945 film Flame of Barbary Coast, as well as the 1971 television film, Sweet, Sweet Rachel.

Villa de Leon has been used in many high-profile music videos, commercials and printed ads, such as Beyonce's "Haunted," Lady Gaga's "Paparazzi," Britney Spears's "My Prerogative" body fragrance commercial, Camila Cabello's "Liar", Ariana Grande, Miley Cyrus and Lana Del Rey's "Don't Call Me Angel", Taemin's "Press Your Number", Selena Gomez’s "Love On", AGNEZ MO's "Long As I Get Paid", Rod Stewart's Christmas special Rod Stewart: Merry Christmas, Baby, and shoots featuring Heidi Klum, Victoria Beckham, Robert Pattinson and Reese Witherspoon.

Its highly recognizable grand staircase has been a major focal point in several of these videos and photographs, as has its balconies and their balustrades, including their appearance on the cover of English rock band Procol Harum's 1973 album, Grand Hotel.

In 2011, Foster The People filmed the music video for "Call It What You Want" and in 2019, Tyler, the Creator's music video "A BOY IS A GUN*" was filmed in the villa.

Villa de Leon was partially damaged in the Palisades Fire and has often been incorrectly identified as the J. Paul Getty Museum by many mainstream news outlets throughout coverage of the fire.
