= Paparazzi (Lady Gaga song) =

2009 single by Lady Gaga

Single by Lady Gaga

from the album The Fame
- Released: July 6, 2009
- Recorded: 2008
- Studio: 150 (Parsippany-Troy Hills, New Jersey)
- Genre: Techno-pop; dance-pop
- Length: 3:29
- Label: Streamline; KonLive; Cherrytree; Interscope
- Songwriters: Lady Gaga; Rob Fusari
- Producer: Rob Fusari

Lady Gaga singles chronology
"Chillin" (2009)	"Paparazzi" (2009)	"Bad Romance" (2009)

Music video
- "Paparazzi" on YouTube

"Paparazzi" is a song by American singer Lady Gaga from her debut studio album, The Fame (2008). It was released by Interscope Records as the fifth and final single from the album. Gaga wrote and co-produced the song with Rob Fusari. The song portrays Gaga's struggles in her quest for fame, as well as balancing success and love. Musically, it is an uptempo techno-pop and dance-pop ballad whose lyrics describe a stalker following somebody to grab attention and fame.

The music video was released on May 29, 2009, and "Paparazzi" was digitally released in Ireland and the UK on July 6, 2009, and physically in Australia on July 10. "LoveGame" was initially planned as the third single in the UK, but "Paparazzi" was chosen instead due to concerns over its lyrics and video. "Paparazzi" received critical acclaim and commercial success, reaching top ten positions in several countries and topping the charts in the Czech Republic, Germany, and Scotland.

The accompanying music video was directed by Jonas Åkerlund and portrays Gaga as a doomed starlet, hounded by photographers, who is almost killed by her boyfriend (played by Alexander Skarsgård). It shows her survival, comeback, revenge on her boyfriend, and experiences on the way to fame. The video won two MTV Video Music Awards in 2009 for Best Art Direction and Best Special Effects. Gaga performed the song at the 2009 MTV Video Music Awards in a performance art piece symbolizing the negative effect of fame leading to death, which was later nominated for VMAs Most Iconic Performance in 2024. Additional live performances of the song took place during many of her concert tours and residency shows.

== Background and release ==
Before she rose to fame, Lady Gaga met music producer Rob Fusari in March 2006 and began dating him in May. Gaga traveled daily to New Jersey to work on songs she had written and compose new material with Fusari. While working together, he compared some of her vocal harmonies to those of Freddie Mercury, lead singer of Queen. He also created the "Lady Gaga" moniker after the Queen song "Radio Ga Ga". Although the musical relationship between Fusari and Gaga was unsuccessful at first, the pair soon started writing more songs for Gaga. Towards the end of 2007, Gaga's management company introduced her to songwriter and producer RedOne, whom they also managed.

What am I really trying to say here? What will the act of me writing this song really do? Me making a conscious decision to write about the paparazzi – I thought about performance art and shock art and how Paris Hilton and her sister and Lindsay Lohan and Nicole Richie are shock artists in their own way. They're not necessarily doing fine arts – something they put in the museums – but it's an art form. That's what this song is trying to say.

— Gaga talking about the different aspects of the song.

By 2008, Gaga relocated to Los Angeles to work extensively with her record label to complete her debut album, The Fame, and set up her own creative team called the Haus of Gaga. "Paparazzi" was one of the songs written by Gaga and Fusari who also produced the track. In a 2009 interview with Rolling Stone, Gaga recalled her relationship with a heavy metal drummer called Luke, who became an inspiration for most of the songs on The Fame, including "Paparazzi". The song became a symbol for Gaga to escape her own narcissism and desire for fame. She was infatuated with Luke, calling him "the love of her life", and ready to be his fan, to turn the camera around and photograph him.

To the Australian Daily Telegraph, Gaga explained that "Paparazzi" was about struggling to balance success and love. Further explanations said that the song was about trying to win the paparazzi and the media in one's favor. "It's a love song for the cameras, but it's also a love song about fame or love – can you have both, or can you only have one", she concluded. "Paparazzi" was the album's third single in Ireland, Italy, and the United Kingdom, the fourth in Canada and the United States and the fifth in Australia, France and New Zealand. Although released on July 6, 2009, in the United Kingdom and four days later in Australia, "LoveGame" initially had been planned as the third single release in the former but deeming its lyrics and music video potentially controversial, it was decided that "Paparazzi" would be released instead.

== Recording and composition ==
"Paparazzi"
A 19-second sample from "Paparazzi" where the chorus plays with Gaga singing the lines "I'm your biggest fan".

"Paparazzi" was recorded at 150 Studios in Parsippany-Troy Hills, New Jersey. Along with the production and songwriting of the track, Gaga also did the background vocals and played piano and synthesizer. Calvin "Sci-Fidelty" Gaines did the programming and Fusari did the audio engineering and recording. Other personnel involved in creating the final version of the song included Robert Orton who did the audio mixing, and Gene Grimaldi who mastered the song at Oasis Mastering Studios, Burbank, California.

"Paparazzi" is a dance-pop and techno-pop song with an uptempo, sultry beat similar to Gaga's previous singles "Just Dance" and "Poker Face". Sheet music for "Paparazzi" shows the key of C minor with a tempo of 115 beats per minute, with the chorus in A♭ major. It is set in common time, and the vocal range spans from G_{3} to E♭_{5}. The verses follow in the chord progression of Cm–A♭–Cm and the chorus uses an A♭–E♭–Fm–D♭ progression. The lyrics of "Paparazzi" deal with stalking and the trappings of fame. Gaga sings about her desire to get attention from the cameras: "I'm your biggest fan/I'll follow you until you love me/Papa, paparazzi." According to The Independent, the track explores "narcissism and celebrity and how we're all guilty participants in pop culture."

== Critical reception ==
The song received acclaim from music critics and has been considered one of the best songs in Gaga's discography years after its release. In 2011, Rolling Stone called it the second greatest Gaga song of all time, praising the song's theme and beat. Jill Menze of Billboard, while reviewing The Fame Ball Tour, complimented Gaga's vocals on the song by saying, "The fame-obsessed ballad 'Paparazzi' showed how adept she can be with her range." Alexis Petridis of The Guardian said that, "You may quickly tire of hearing the album's theme constantly reiterated, but the tune of 'Paparazzi' takes up residence in your brain and refuses to budge." Stephen Thomas Erlewine of AllMusic called the song clever and said that it "functions simultaneously as glorious pop trash and a wicked parody of it."

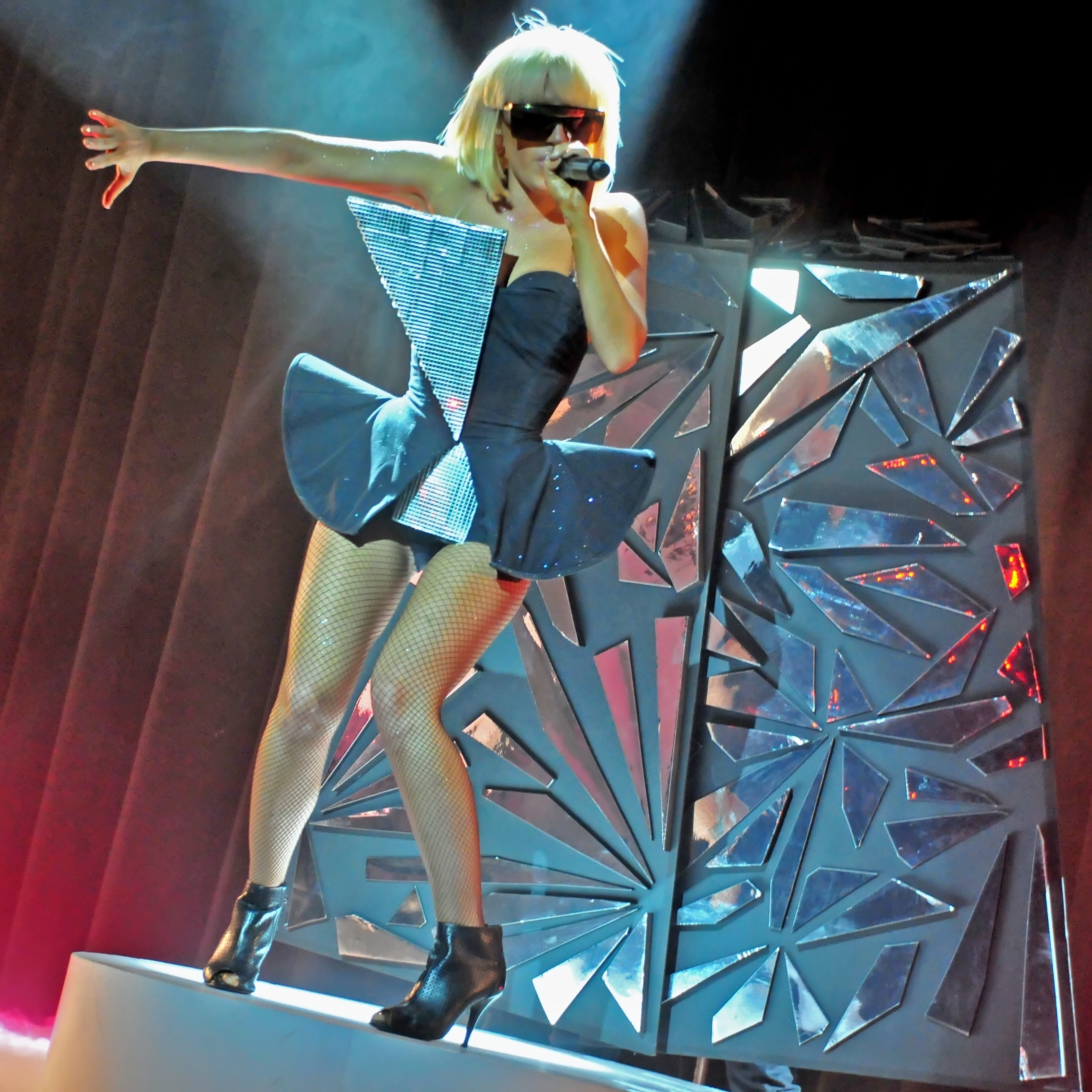
Gaga performing "Paparazzi" on The Fame Ball Tour (2009)

Priya Elan of The Times thought that "even the trio of songs that provides the core of the album's celebrity theme ('Paparazzi', 'Beautiful Dirty Rich' and the title track) don't ruminate on the addictive inanity of fame, choosing instead to observe passively." David Balls from Digital Spy praised Gaga's decision of releasing a mid-tempo track after two uptempos ("Just Dance" and "Poker Face") saying that "thanks to a typically catchy chorus and some smart, celebrity-themed lyrics, very nearly as thrilling in the finish. Backed with a hilariously self-indulgent video, it seems GaGa still has us firmly in her clutch and, ahem, squealing for more."

Evan Sawdey of PopMatters said that both "Paparazzi" and the earlier single "Poker Face" are comparable with the musical styles of first single "Just Dance" but added that "never once does it feel like Gaga is deliberately repeating herself, instead, her faults only come from covering territory that she's obviously not prepared for." Freedom du Lac of The Washington Post said that even though Gaga turns somewhat serious while disapprovingly singing "Paparazzi", the song comes across as flat and faceless as well as vapid. Erika Howard of the New Times Broward-Palm Beach called it the most telling track from the album. Jon Caramanica of The New York Times said that "'Paparazzi' is a love letter from camera to subject but stops short of admitting the affection runs both ways. Any notion that Lady Gaga is sketching an elaborate stunt is stopped cold at the lyric sheet, a perverse flaunting of simplicity that betrays no cynicism whatsoever."

NME ranked it at number 9 in their list of the best songs of 2009. Pitchfork ranked "Paparazzi" number 83 on their list of 2009's 100 best tracks, and noted it proved powerful enough to set Gaga apart from the wave of Madonnabes, adding that it "turned out to be the best Madonna song of the 21st century". Kristen S. Hé of Vulture in 2025 called it Gaga's fourth best track, who felt "on the radio in 2009, it sounded alluring and dangerous — there was nothing else like it". The same year, Adam White of The Independent named "Paparazzi" Gaga's third best, noting that although it wasn't her debut single, it "felt like her proper arrival, highlighting her romanticism, her vulnerability and, even more than 'Poker Face', her genius when it comes to killer hooks."

== Chart performance ==
In the United States, the song debuted on the Billboard Hot 100 at number 74 on the issue dated September 12, 2009, and reached a peak of number six, becoming her fourth consecutive top-ten single on the chart. With the song, Gaga joined Christina Aguilera, Beyoncé, and Fergie as the only women this decade to collect four Hot 100 top-tens from a debut album. It also reached the top of Billboard's Pop Songs chart, thus making Gaga the first artist in the 17-year history of Pop Songs chart to have her first four singles from a debut album reach the top of the chart. The song also topped the Hot Dance Club Songs chart. As of February 2018, it has sold 3.6 million digital downloads in the United States according to Nielsen Soundscan. It became Gaga's fourth song to top the three-million mark, and was certified five-times Platinum by the Recording Industry Association of America (RIAA). "Paparazzi" debuted on the Canadian Hot 100 at number 92 and moved up to number 57 the following week becoming the week's greatest digital gainer. The song ultimately peaked at number three on the chart, in its 13th week.

"Paparazzi" debuted on the official Australian Singles Chart at number 73 on the issue dated June 1, 2009, and leaped to 27 the next week. The song ultimately peaked at number two, giving Gaga her fourth top five single in Australia. The song was certified six times platinum by the Australian Recording Industry Association (ARIA) for shipment of 420,000 copies. In New Zealand, "Paparazzi" debuted at number 23 on the week ending June 22, 2009, and reached a peak of number five. The song was later certified double platinum by Recorded Music NZ (RMNZ), for shipping over 60,000 copies.

In the UK, "Paparazzi" debuted on the UK Singles Chart at number 99 in February 2009 due to digital downloads after the release of The Fame. It reached number 13 for the issue dated June 21, 2009, after jumping from 43 to this position from the last week. The next week the song further climbed to number eight and ultimately peaked at number four. As of January 2025, the song has sold 1.3 million copies in the UK with 75 million streams. and is certified double platinum by the British Phonographic Industry (BPI). "Paparazzi" debuted at number 38 on the Irish Singles Chart and peaked at number four. "Paparazzi" reached number one in Germany, making it her second chart-topper there. The song also debuted on the Dutch Top 40 at number 27 on the issue dated July 18, 2009. It peaked at number four on its sixth week on the chart. In Italy, the song debuted at number 19 and then climbed to number three, becoming Gaga's second top three there. The song also debuted on the French Singles Charts at number 6 on the issue dated December 12, 2009 and remained at the number six for three weeks, before dropping at number 7 the first week of 2010, dated January 2, 2010 and stay in the top ten for 5 weeks and 33 weeks in the top 100, becoming Gaga's fourth top ten in France.

== Music video ==
=== Background ===
The music video was directed by Swedish director, Jonas Åkerlund, who had previously directed music videos for artists like the Smashing Pumpkins, Madonna, Moby, Rammstein, and U2. His wife Bea Åkerlund was hired as Gaga's stylist for the video. It was filmed on April 13–14, 2009 at Villa de Leon in Malibu, California, and at Chateau d'Or in Bel Air, Los Angeles. Gaga told MTV News that she was satisfied with the finished version of the "Paparazzi" video, likening it to a short film. In an interview with The Canadian Press on May 26, 2009, Gaga cited her video as "the most amazing creative work that [she's] put together so far." She went on to describe the message of the video:

It has a real, genuine, powerful message about fame-whoring and death and the demise of the celebrity, and what that does to young people. The video explores ideas about sort of hyperbolic situations that people will go to in order to be famous. Most specifically, pornography and murder. These are some of the major themes in the video.

Later, in her V magazine cover story, Gaga believed that Diana, Princess of Wales was referenced in the video, claiming she died because of being a martyr symbolic of fame. The video was supposed to premiere on June 4, 2009, in the United Kingdom and Ireland, on Channel 4. However, while touring in Australia, Gaga posted a message on her Twitter account on May 29, 2009, saying "Stop leaking my motherf**king videos", which referred to the video being released without the singer's consent.

=== Synopsis ===
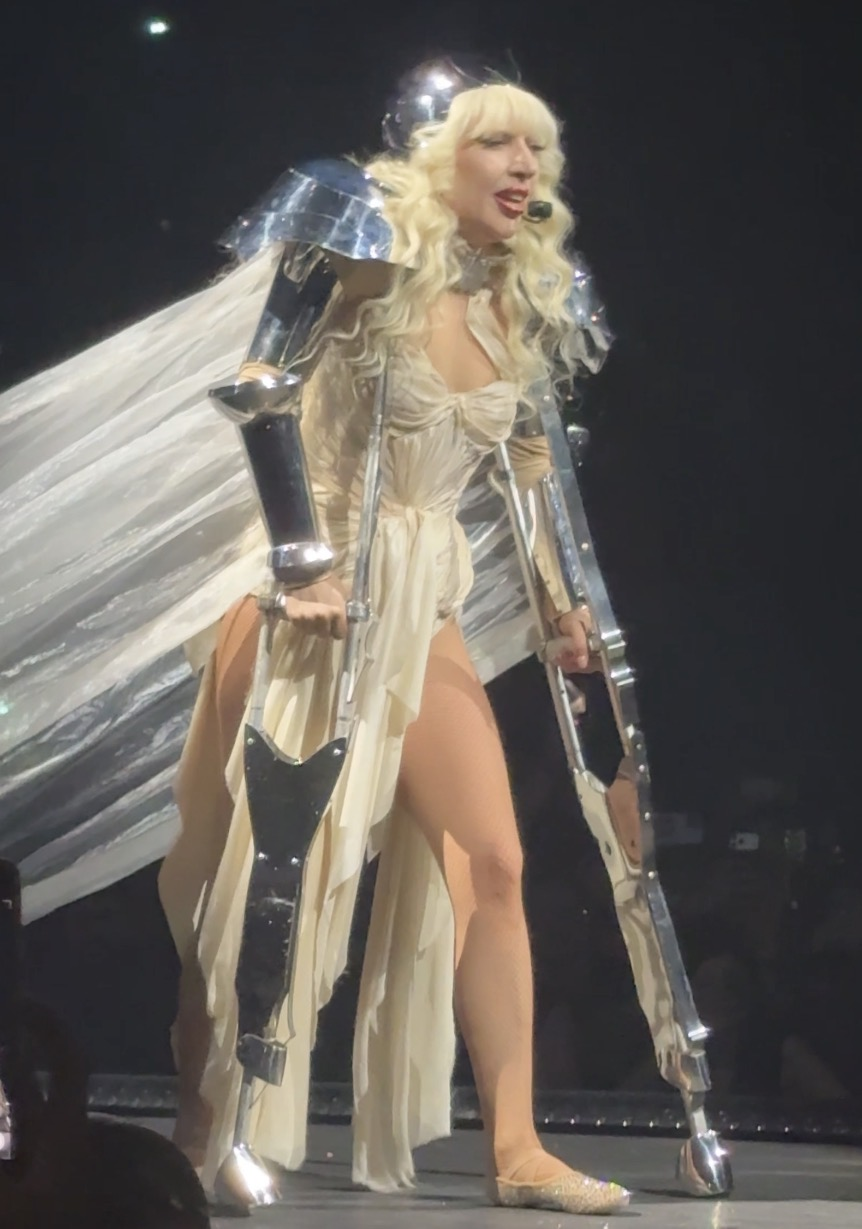
Gaga wearing a Metropolis (1927)-inspired metallic leotard and helmet while using crutches in the "Paparazzi" video (left); she later reprised the look during her Mayhem Ball tour (2025–2026) (right).

The music video is seven minutes long. Swedish actor Alexander Skarsgård plays Gaga's boyfriend. The video features a murderous plot line involving a doomed starlet who is constantly followed by photographers. The video opens with a shot of a seaside mansion, where Gaga and her boyfriend are shown lying on a bed talking in Swedish. They move to the balcony and start making out; however, when hidden photographers start taking pictures of them, Gaga realizes that her boyfriend has set the paparazzi to photograph her and tries to stop him. Her struggles nevertheless remain futile even when she punches him, and in a final frantic attempt at defense, she smashes a nearby bottle of liquor into his face. The enraged boyfriend throws her over the balcony. Gaga lies on the ground in her own blood as the photographers continue to take pictures of her bloody body and tabloid headlines proclaim that her career is over. According to Rolling Stone, this scene pays homage to Alfred Hitchcock's film Vertigo (1958).

Later, Gaga is shown getting out of a limousine, being carried by male dancers to a wheelchair. It is during this scene that the song starts. As the dancers gyrate around her, she starts walking down the carpet with the help of a pair of crutches while wearing a metallic bustier and a matching helmet. The metallic outfit is a reference to the film Metropolis (1927). These scenes are interspersed with scenes of dead models lying around the mansion. Next Gaga is shown on a golden couch where she makes out with a trio of hair metal rockers during the line "Loving you is cherry pie". The trio, which consist of the triplets Calle "Kelii" Landeberg, Nisse "Izzy" Landeberg, and Pelle "Rock" Landeberg are known as Snake of Eden and they are from the reality television dating program Daisy of Love. According to MTV, this scene is a reference to the song "Cherry Pie" by American glam band Warrant. The video continues through the intermediate bridge with Gaga wearing a dress made up of film strips and a towering feathered Mohawk headdress.

In the next scene, Gaga and her eye-patch wearing boyfriend are reading magazines on a sofa in a tea room. Gaga wears a yellow jumpsuit with circular glasses and shoulder pads. The Guardian compared this look with that of Minnie Mouse. She finally takes her revenge on her boyfriend by discreetly poisoning his drink with white powder concealed in her ring. As he falls dead, Gaga calls 9-1-1 and declares that she just killed her boyfriend. The police arrive at the mansion and arrest Gaga who, wearing a tall ice cream cone corkscrew wig, walks to the police car as the paparazzi surround her once again. Images flash by, with newspapers proclaiming her innocence and that Gaga is back in the spotlight and has regained her fame. The video ends with Gaga posing for mug shots like a fashion model while wearing a tulip shaped metallic dress similar to the single cover.

=== Reception ===
Rolling Stone writer Daniel Kreps compared the video with the 1992 music video for "November Rain" by Guns N' Roses. He described the scenes of the dead models as stomach-turning while complimenting the video for "brimming with cinematic style [so] that it's hard to take your eyes off it, though it will likely be labeled as a little self-indulgent." He also commented on the leaking of the video, saying that it "warranted more than just a simple leak; it deserved a red carpet." Anna Pickard from The Guardian complimented the video saying that "quite a lot of work has gone into it". However, she opined that the video was too long. Entertainment Weekly gave a positive review of the video, saying "it gives us even more of the next-level cuckoo we've come to expect from the girl born Stefani Joanne Angelina Germanotta." The paparazzi theme of the video was compared to Britney Spears' 2004 music video, "Everytime". MTV News called the video a "1940s romantic-epic-style video" that "proves once and for all that Gaga is a true original with a unique vision." The video was nominated for five VMAs at the 2009 awards in the categories of Best Direction, Best Editing, Best Special Effects, Best Cinematography and Best Art Direction. Along with four other nominations for "Poker Face", she and Beyoncé were tied for most nominations that year. The video won the award for Best Art Direction and Best Special Effects. The music video for Gaga's single "Telephone" is a continuation of the "Paparazzi" music video, and is a short film as well. The video picks up right where "Paparazzi" left off; starting with Gaga in prison.

== Live performances ==
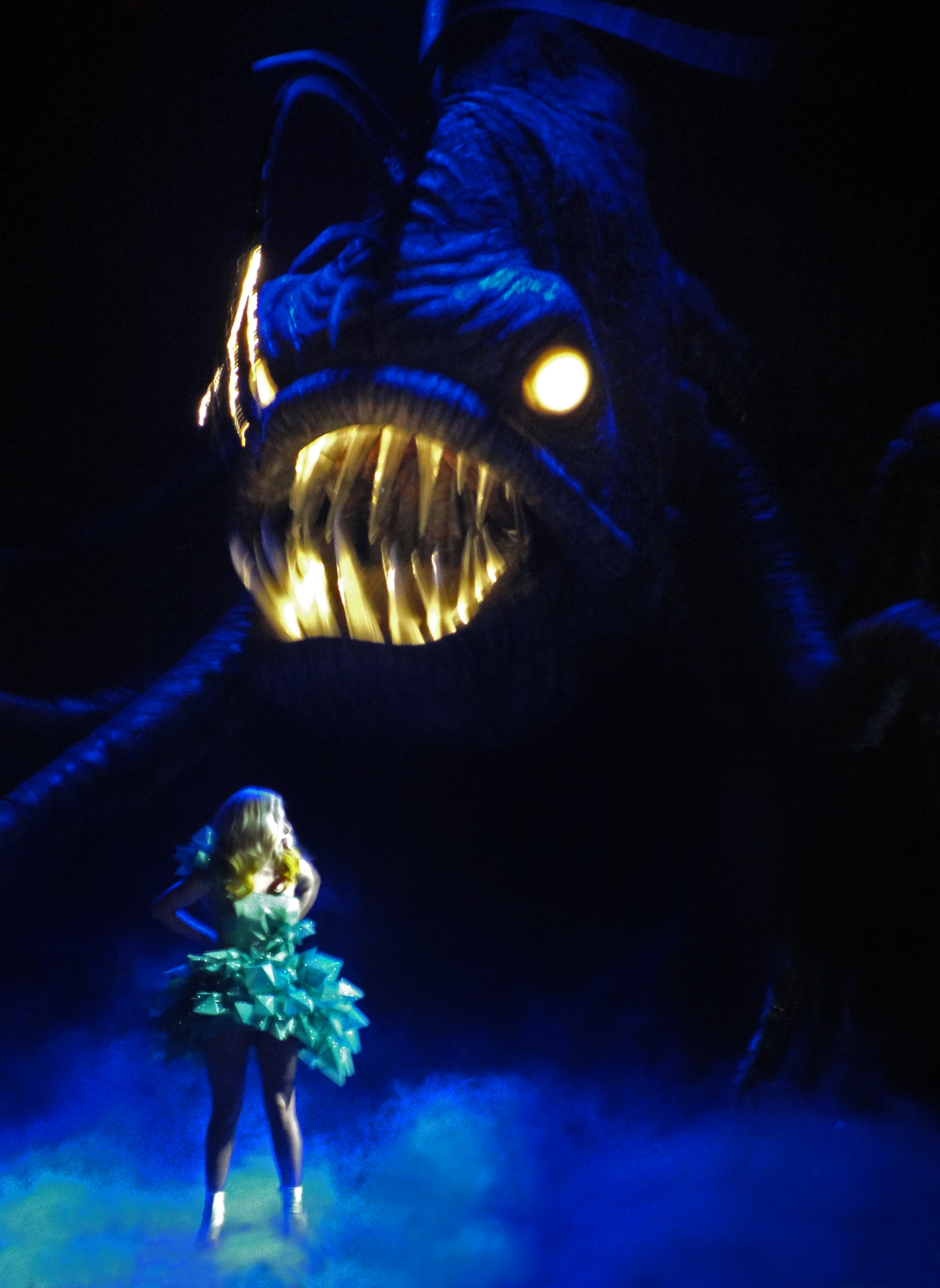
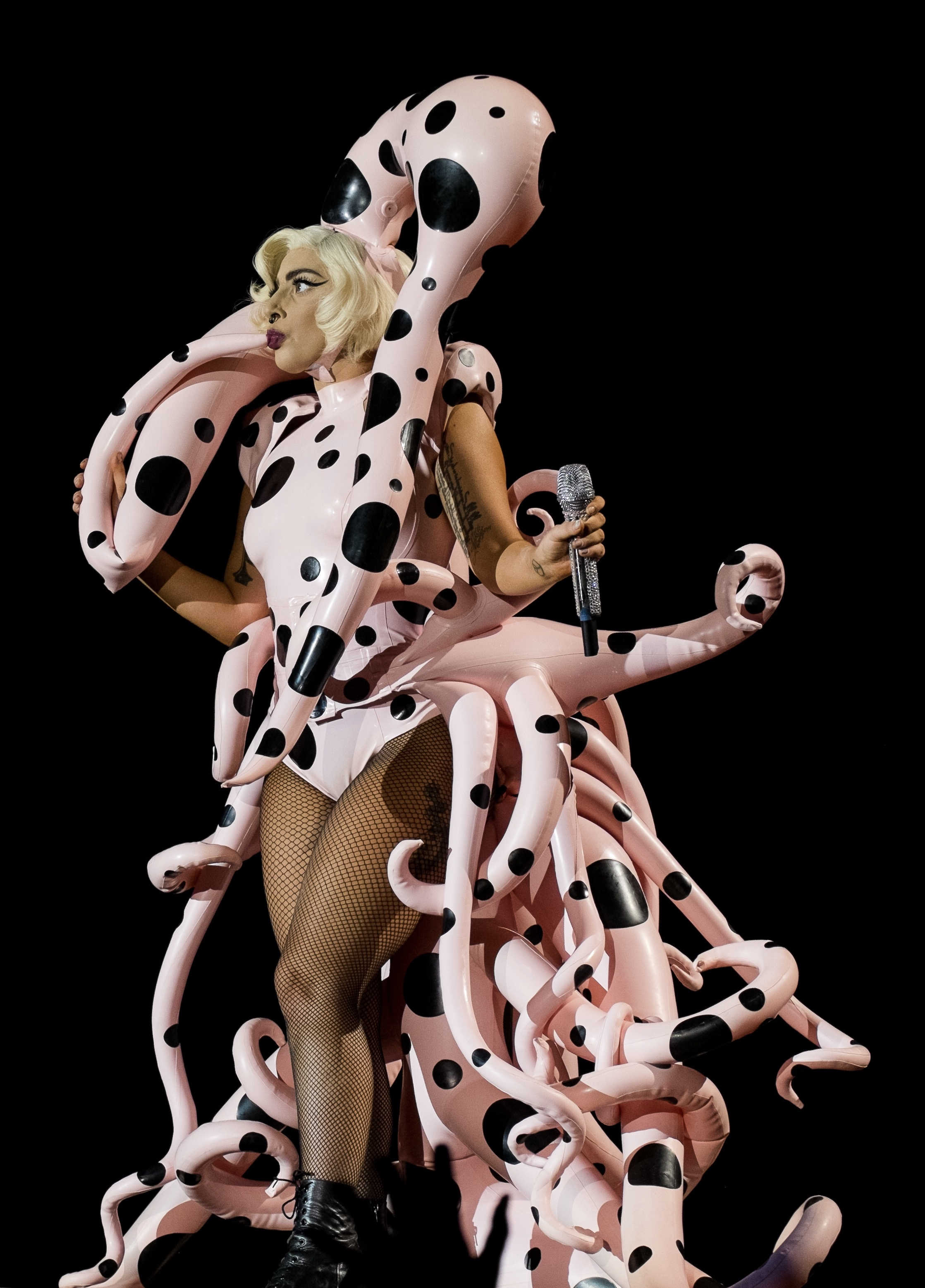
Gaga performing "Paparazzi" on the 2010 leg of The Monster Ball Tour while getting attacked by the Angler fish (left) and wearing a tentacled costume for the song at the ArtRave: The Artpop Ball tour (right) in 2014

Gaga performed "Paparazzi" live on the UK program The Album Chart Show on February 14, 2009, as promotion for The Fame. The song was performed at Capital Radio 95.8 FM in an acoustic piano version on May 1, 2009. On June 26, 2009, Gaga performed the song at the Glastonbury Festival emerging from a silver case on stage. The song was a major part of Gaga's performance in her first headlining Fame Ball tour as the opening number of the setlist. The show started with a video intro called "The Heart" where Gaga played an alternate persona called Candy Warhol. She wore a silver and black short skirt like a tutu and shaped like peplum on both sides. She was surrounded by her dancers holding plates which were encrusted with crystals and completely hid them. The stage was surrounded by mechanical fog and heavy lighting was being emitted from the background.

"Paparazzi" was performed at the 2009 MTV Video Music Awards, which began with Gaga lying on the floor, on a set that was described as an ornate mansion. She stumbled across the stage and did choreographed dance moves, finally ending up playing a piano. The final chorus involved theatrical blood dripping from Gaga's ribcage as Gaga collapsed on the stage wailing in agony and one of the dancers gently lifted her. Gaga then hung lifeless with one hand rising above her dancers and blood smeared on her face with a golden halo being projected on the screen behind her. Gaga dedicated the performance to her fans. Ashley Laderer from Billboard opined that "this was the performance that really made Lady Gaga. It proved she was more than just a superficial pop star—she was an artist, and quite unlike one we'd ever seen before, a true force to be reckoned with." Morgan Evans of Harper's Bazaar thought that Gaga's VMA performance "introduced the world to the darker, edgier side she would soon become known for." It was nominated for VMAs Most Iconic Performance at the 2024 MTV Video Music Awards.

The song was performed by Gaga in a similar choreography at the thirty-fifth season of NBC's late night comedy show Saturday Night Live. It was also present on the set list of Gaga's Monster Ball Tour (2009–2011). On the original version of the show, she wore multiple donned braided extensions and was perched atop a railing. From each of her braids, a dancer was attached on the stage. A backdrop of stars were shown during the performance. During the revised Monster Ball shows, Gaga changed the concept and the performance of the song. She wore an emerald green dress by Thierry Mugler, and was attacked by a giant, mechanical Angler fish. Gaga then removed the dress to reveal a leotard of the same color and during the bridge she is lowered beneath the stage to acquire her pyro-technic bra. In the final chorus of the song Gaga returns and kills the monster with the sparks from the bra. The song was part of the setlist of Gaga's 2012–2013 tour, the Born This Way Ball. Gaga was notably absent from stage for the first two minutes of the song, and "Mother G.O.A.T.", a floating mechanical head performed it instead of her. Gaga then emerged on stage, and concluded the song while shooting the head, making it cry blood.

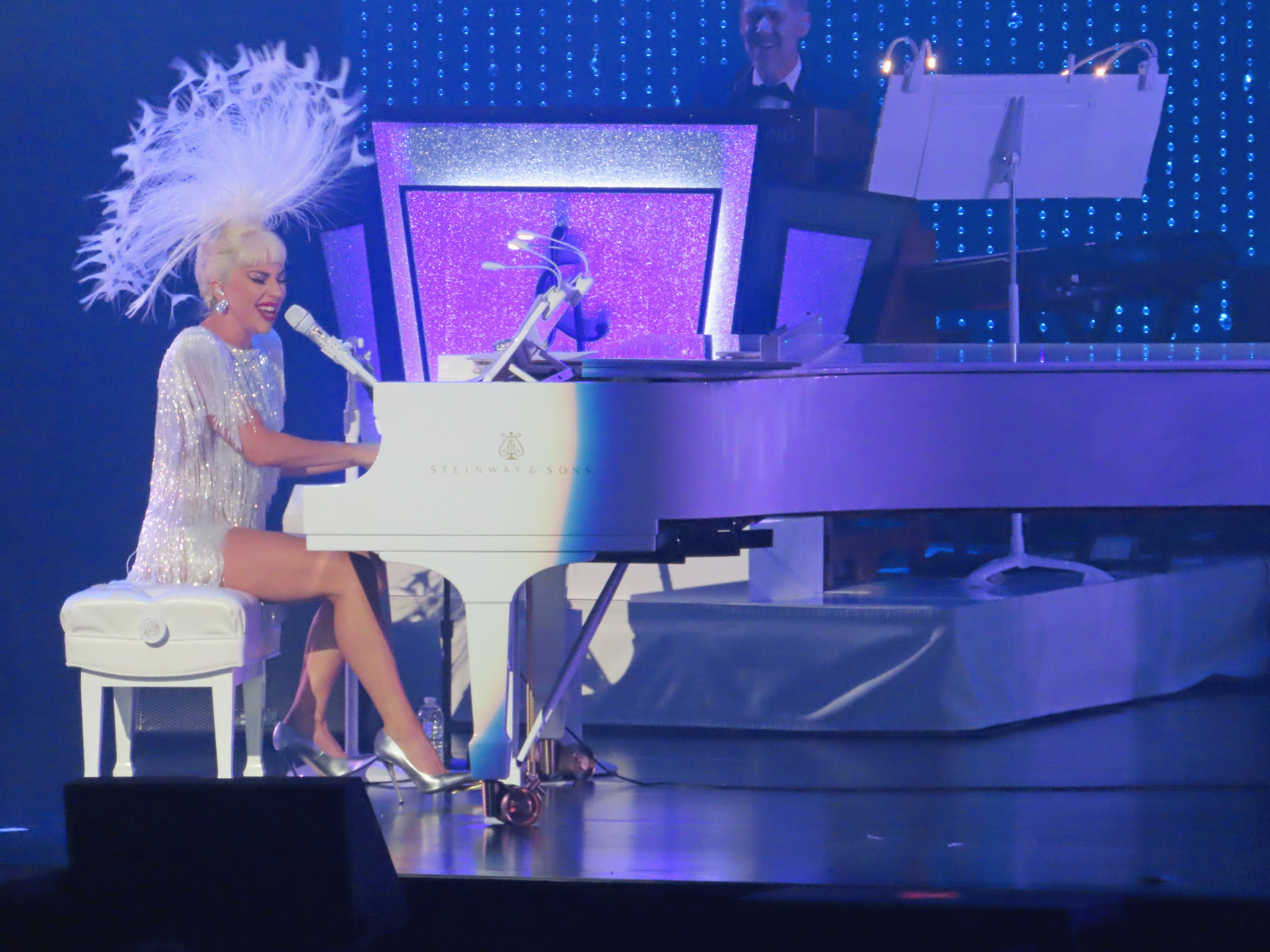
Gaga performing "Paparazzi" on the piano at her Jazz & Piano residency in Las Vegas (2022)

During the ArtRave: The Artpop Ball tour (2014), Gaga performed "Paparazzi" dressed up in a polka-dotted rubber outfit with tentacles growing out around her waist and her head. Rob Sheffield from Rolling Stone described her look as "an inflatable rubber order of fried calamari growing out of her spine", while Adam Carlson from Billboard said that the outfit made Gaga look like a "dancing Ursula from The Little Mermaid ". The song was added to the setlist of the Joanne World Tour (2017–2018), where she was wearing a red leather bodysuit and tassel leather boots, and the performance ended with a choreographed attack on Gaga by her dancers.

"Paparazzi" was performed on Lady Gaga Enigma + Jazz & Piano (2018–2022), the singer's Las Vegas residency, which consisted of two different shows. On the Enigma shows, she performed "Paparazzi" in a floating orb-like cage that was elevated above the audience, while on the Jazz and Piano show, she performed it on the piano, with "the full orchestra kicking in with some apropos suspense-movie chase music". Talking about the latter, John Katsilometes of the Las Vegas Review-Journal argued that "a live version of that song in Vegas would be a hit single", saying that the "raging" performance "always jolts the crowd to a standing ovation". The song was next performed at her 2025 promotional concerts for Mayhem, including a headlining set at Coachella 2025, in a stripped-down rendition, where Gaga crossed the stage with a billowing piece of white fabric, along with a helmet, metallic plates and crutches, referencing the music video. She repeated this performance for the Mayhem Ball tour (2025–2026) with her white cape being lit up with colorful lights.

== Track listing ==
UK / AUS CD single

1. "Paparazzi" (Album Version) – 3:28
2. "Paparazzi" (Filthy Dukes Remix) – 5:21

CAN / AUS / US / FRA remix EP

1. "Paparazzi" (Stuart Price Remix) – 3:19
2. "Paparazzi" (Moto Blanco Edit) – 4:05
3. "Paparazzi" (Filthy Dukes Club Mix) – 5:21
4. "Paparazzi" (James Carameta Tabloid Club Edit) – 4:27

UK / IRE remix EP

1. "Paparazzi" – 3:27
2. "Paparazzi" (Filthy Dukes Club Mix) – 5:21
3. "Paparazzi" (Moto Blanco Edit) – 4:05
4. "Paparazzi" (Stuart Price Remix) – 3:19
5. "Paparazzi" (Yuksek Remix) – 4:47

US iTunes/Apple Music remix EP

1. "Paparazzi" (Demolition Crew Remix) – 3:55
2. "Paparazzi" (Moto Blanco Remix) (Radio Version) – 4:05
3. "Paparazzi" (Stuart Price Remix) – 3:19
4. "Paparazzi" (Filthy Dukes Remix) – 5:21

US digital remix EP – Part Deux

1. "Paparazzi" (Chew Fu Ghettohouse Radio Edit) – 3:39
2. "Paparazzi" (Yuksek Remix) – 4:47
3. "Paparazzi" (James Camareta Tabloid Club Edit) – 4:27

US 'The Remixes' CD single

1. "Paparazzi" (Demolition Crew Remix) – 3:55
2. "Paparazzi" (Moto Blanco Edit) – 4:05
3. "Paparazzi" (Stuart Price Remix) – 3:19
4. "Paparazzi" (Filthy Dukes Club Mix) – 5:21
5. "Paparazzi" (James Camareta Tabloid Club Edit) – 4:27
6. "Paparazzi" (Album Version) – 3:29
7. "Paparazzi" (Instrumental Version) – 3:29

FRA / GER remix EP / GER CD single

1. "Paparazzi" (Moto Blanco Edit) – 4:05
2. "Paparazzi" (Moto Blanco Bostic Dub) – 6:42
3. "Paparazzi" (Demolition Crew Remix) – 3:55
4. "Paparazzi" (Stuart Price Remix) – 3:19
5. "Paparazzi" (Filthy Dukes Club Mix) – 5:21
6. "Paparazzi" (Yuksek Remix) – 4:47
7. "Paparazzi" (James Camareta Tabloid Club Edit) – 4:27
8. "Paparazzi" (Radio Edit) – 3:28

== Credits and personnel ==
Credits adapted from the liner notes of The Fame.

- Lady Gaga – vocals, songwriting, co-production, piano, synthesizer
- Rob Fusari – songwriting, production
- Calvin "Sci-Fidelty" Gaines – programming
- Robert Orton – audio mixing
- Gene Grimaldi – audio mastering at Oasis Mastering, Burbank, California
- Recorded at 150 Studios, Parsippany-Troy Hills, New Jersey

== Charts ==
=== Weekly charts ===
Weekly chart performance
Chart (2009–2010)	Peak position
Australia (ARIA)	2
Austria (Ö3 Austria Top 40)	3
Belgium (Ultratop 50 Flanders)	7
Belgium (Ultratop 50 Wallonia)	6
Brazilian Hot 100 Airplay (Billboard)	18
Canada Hot 100 (Billboard)	3
Canada AC (Billboard)	37
Canada CHR/Top 40 (Billboard)	2
Canada Hot AC (Billboard)	2
CIS Airplay (TopHit)	3
Croatia International Airplay (HRT)	5
Czech Republic Airplay (ČNS IFPI)	1
Denmark (Tracklisten)	12
European Hot 100 Singles (Billboard)	3
Finland (Suomen virallinen lista)	9
France (SNEP)	6
Germany (GfK)	1
Hungary (Dance Top 40)	25
Hungary (Rádiós Top 40)	10
Ireland (IRMA)	4
Israel (Media Forest)	3
Italy (FIMI)	3
Luxembourg Digital Song Sales (Billboard)	6
Netherlands (Dutch Top 40)	4
Netherlands (Single Top 100)	17
New Zealand (Recorded Music NZ)	5
Portugal Digital Song Sales (Billboard)	7
Russia Airplay (TopHit)	5
Scottish Singles Sales (Official Charts)	1
Slovakia Airplay (ČNS IFPI)	5
Spain (Promusicae)	46
South Korea International Singles (Gaon)	80
Sweden (Sverigetopplistan)	22
Switzerland (Schweizer Hitparade)	4
Ukraine Airplay (TopHit)	1
UK Singles (Official Charts)	4
US Billboard Hot 100	6
US Adult Contemporary (Billboard)	15
US Adult Pop Airplay (Billboard)	14
US Dance Club Songs (Billboard)	1
US Pop Airplay (Billboard)	1
US Rhythmic Airplay (Billboard)	7

Weekly chart performance
Chart (2017)	Peak position
US Hot Dance/Electronic Songs (Billboard)	17

Weekly chart performance
Chart (2024)	Peak position
Poland (Polish Airplay Top 100)	56

Weekly chart performance
Chart (2025)	Peak position
Brazil Hot 100 (Billboard)	76
Singapore (RIAS)	26

Weekly chart performance
Chart (2026)	Peak position
Global Excl. US (Billboard)	186

=== Monthly charts ===
Monthly chart performance
Chart (2009)	Peak position
CIS Airplay (TopHit)	6
Russia Airplay (TopHit)	7
Ukraine Airplay (TopHit)	3

=== Year-end charts ===
Year-end chart performance
Chart (2009)	Position
Australia (ARIA)	12
Austria (Ö3 Austria Top 40)	21
Belgium (Ultratop 50 Flanders)	74
Belgium (Ultratop 50 Wallonia)	59
Canada (Canadian Hot 100)	18
CIS Airplay (TopHit)	56
Croatia International Airplay (HRT)	41
European Hot 100 Singles (Billboard)	34
France (SNEP)	92
Germany (Media Control GfK)	23
Hungary (Dance Top 40)	129
Hungary (Rádiós Top 40)	49
Italy (FIMI)	24
Netherlands (Dutch Top 40)	31
Netherlands (Single Top 100)	95
New Zealand (Recorded Music NZ)	41
Russia Airplay (TopHit)	63
Switzerland (Schweizer Hitparade)	29
Ukraine Airplay (TopHit)	46
UK Singles (Official Charts)	21
US Billboard Hot 100	53
US Radio Songs (Billboard)	52

Year-end chart performance
Chart (2010)	Position
European Hot 100 Singles (Billboard)	45
France (SNEP)	61
Ukraine Airplay (TopHit)	148
US Billboard Hot 100	64
US Adult Contemporary (Billboard)	38

Year-end chart performance
Chart (2011)	Position
CIS Airplay (TopHit)	176
Russia Airplay (TopHit)	188
Ukraine Airplay (TopHit)	148

=== Decade-end charts ===
Decade-end chart performance
Chart (2000–09)	Position
Australia (ARIA)	78

== Certifications and sales ==
Certifications and sales
Region	Certification	Certified units/sales
Australia (ARIA)	6× Platinum	420,000^{‡}
Austria (IFPI Austria)	Platinum	30,000^{*}
Brazil (Pro-Música Brasil)	3× Platinum	180,000^{‡}
Denmark (IFPI Danmark)	Platinum	90,000^{‡}
France	—	120,000
Germany (BVMI)	3× Gold	450,000^{‡}
Italy (FIMI)	Platinum	20,000^{*}
New Zealand (RMNZ)	2× Platinum	60,000^{‡}
Spain (Promusicae) Since 2015	Gold	30,000^{‡}
Sweden (GLF)	Gold	10,000^{^}
Switzerland (IFPI Switzerland)	Gold	15,000^{^}
United Kingdom (BPI)	2× Platinum	1,300,000
United States (RIAA)	5× Platinum	5,000,000^{‡}
^{*} Sales figures based on certification alone.^{^} Shipments figures based on certification alone.^{‡} Sales+streaming figures based on certification alone.

== Release history ==
Release dates and formats
Region	Date	Format	Version	Label	Ref.
British Isles	July 6, 2009	Digital download	Original	Interscope	
United Kingdom	July 6, 2009	CD single	Original; Filthy Dukes remix	Polydor	
Australia	July 10, 2009	CD single	Original; Filthy Dukes remix	Interscope	
Italy	July 10, 2009	Radio airplay	Original	Universal	
United States	September 1, 2009	Rhythmic radio	Original	Interscope	
United States	September 8, 2009	Contemporary hit radio	Original	Interscope	
Various	September 8, 2009	Digital download	The Remixes	Interscope	
Germany	September 11, 2009	CD single	Original	Interscope	
Various	September 29, 2009	Digital download	The Remixes Part Deux	Interscope	
France	December 7, 2009	CD single	Original	Polydor	

== See also ==
- List of best-selling singles of the 2000s (Australia)
- List of Billboard Mainstream Top 40 number-one songs of 2009
- List of number-one songs of the 2000s (Czech Republic)
- List of number-one hits of 2009 (Germany)
- List of number-one dance singles of 2009 (U.S.)
- List of Billboard Hot 100 top-ten singles in 2009
