= George Applegarth =

American architect (1876–1972)

George Adrian Applegarth
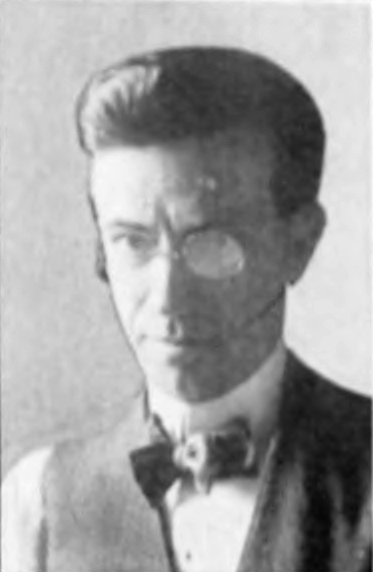
- Born: October 4, 1875; Oakland, California, U.S.
- Died: January 19, 1972 (aged 96); San Francisco, California, U.S.
- Burial place: Holy Cross Cemetery, Colma, California, U.S.
- Education: University of California, Berkeley, École des Beaux-Arts
- Occupation: Architect
- Spouse: Gwendolyn Powers
- Children: 3

George Adrian Applegarth (October 4, 1875 – January 19, 1972) was an American architect. Applegarth’s career included designing the California Palace of the Legion of Honor, the Clift Hotel (now The Clift Royal Sonesta Hotel), and projects for the town of Clyde, California. He co-founded the architectural firm, MacDonald & Applegarth.

== Early life and education ==
Applegarth was born on October 4, 1875, in Oakland, California, to parents Henrietta Anne (née Sanders) and John Applegarth. His mother was born in Walcot, Somerset, England, and his father was born in Canada. George H. Sanders, of the architectural firm Wright & Sanders was his maternal uncle; and John Arnold Sanders, a noted English painter and sculptor, was his maternal grandfather.

He graduated from Oakland High School; and began his career as a draughtsman for Wright & Sanders in San Francisco, while he studied drawing at the University of California, Berkeley under Bernard Maybeck. Applegarth continued his training at École des Beaux-Arts in Paris (degree in April 1906), where he met his future work partner Kenneth A. MacDonald Jr.

== Career ==
He returned to the United States after the 1906 San Francisco earthquake and fires. In 1907, Applegarth obtained his architecture license in California. From 1907 until 1912, he was part of the architecture firm MacDonald & Applegarth, a collaboration with his former classmate.

Around 1917, he helped in the construction of Clyde, California, once a company town built for the employees of the Pacific Coast Shipbuilding Company. Bernard Maybeck led the project, and it was funded in part by the United States government loan.

He was a fellow of the American Institute of Architects, and for a period of time served as president of the San Francisco chapter.

== Personal life and death ==
Applegarth was married to Gwendolyn Powers (1889–1981), together they had three children.

He died on January 19, 1972, while in a hospital in San Francisco.

== List of notable buildings ==
Architecture works by George Adrian Applegarth
Year	Name	Firm	Location	Notes
1907	Eyre Building, 161 Kearny Street		San Francisco, California	
1907	Metropolis Trust and Savings Bank, 623–631 Market Street		San Francisco, California	
1907	St. Andrew Hotel, 438 Post Street		San Francisco, California	
1908	Forrest Building, 1053–1055 Market Street		San Francisco, California	
1908	Phoenix Building, 220–228 Grant Avenue		San Francisco, California	
1908	3 Presidio Terrace	MacDonald & Applegart	Presidio, San Francisco, California	
1908	4 Presidio Terrace, MacDonald House	MacDonald & Applegart	Presidio, San Francisco, California	
1908	5 Presidio Terrace, Dr. Hartland Law House	MacDonald & Applegart	Presidio, San Francisco, California	
1909	Eastern Outfitting Company Building, 1017–1021 Market Street	Applegarth	Union Square, San Francisco, California	
1913	Clift Hotel (The Clift Royal Sonesta Hotel), 495 Geary Street	MacDonald & Applegart	Tenderloin, San Francisco, California	
c. 1912–1913	Spreckels Mansion, 2080 Washington Street	MacDonald & Applegarth	Pacific Heights, San Francisco, California	Built for businessman Adolph B. Spreckels.
1912	King George Hotel, 334 Mason Street	MacDonald & Applegarth	Union Square, San Francisco, California	
1916	2775 Vallejo Street	Applegarth	Pacific Heights, San Francisco, California	
1916	2785 Vallejo Street	Applegarth	Pacific Heights, San Francisco, California	
1919	Oceanic Building	Applegarth	San Francisco, California	was demolished in 1979, and replaced by 101 California Street
1953	Downtown Center Garage (now Mason O'Farrell Garage), 325 Mason Street	Applegarth	Union Square, San Francisco, California	
