= Kenneth A. MacDonald Jr. =

American architect (1880–1937)

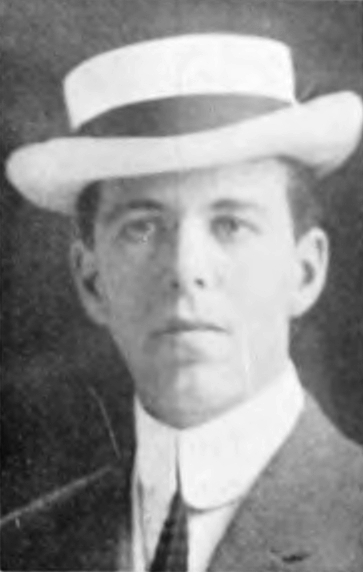
- Born: 1880; Louisville, Kentucky, U.S.
- Died: December 1937 (aged 56–57); Los Angeles, California, U.S.
- Education: École des Beaux-Arts
- Occupation: Architect
- Known for: Spreckels Mansion

Kenneth A. MacDonald Jr. (1880 – December 1937) was an American architect, known for his residential and commercial work in San Francisco and Los Angeles.

== Early life ==
Kenneth MacDonald Jr. was born 1880 in Louisville, Kentucky. His father was an architect.

MacDonald trained at École des Beaux-Arts in Paris, as did his early architecture partner George Adrian Applegarth.

== Career ==
In 1906, he moved to San Francisco after school. The firm of MacDonald & Applegarth collaboration starting in 1907 and they worked together on over 30 residences in San Francisco, including the Spreckels Mansion (1912) in San Francisco owned by Adolph B. Spreckels.

MacDonald was partner in several design firms including San Francisco's MacDonald & Applegarth (1907–1912), Couchot & MacDonald (1912–1923), and his solo firm in Los Angeles (1923–). His office for Couchot & MacDonald were located at 234 Pine Street, San Francisco.

Kenneth MacDonald Jr. died in Los Angeles in December 1937.

== Works ==
Architecture works by Kenneth MacDonald Jr.
Year	Name	Firm	Location (in California)	Notes
1929	Hill Garage		Los Angeles	
1928	Pellissier Apartment House Project		Los Angeles	
1927	Leon Kauffman Residence/Villa de Leon		Pacific Palisades, Los Angeles	
1927	Portal of the Folded Wings		North Hollywood, Los Angeles	In Valhalla Memorial Park Cemetery, NRHP-listed
1924–1925	Western Costume Building		Downtown Los Angeles	NRHP-listed
1924	Lasky-Case-Fairbanks-Pickford Hotel Project	Couchot & MacDonald	Hollywood, Los Angeles	
1923	Southern Pacific Railroad Company, Passenger Depot #2	Couchot & MacDonald	Glendale	
1922–1924	Broadway-Spring Arcade	Couchot & MacDonald	Downtown Los Angeles	NRHP-listed
1913	Clift Hotel	MacDonald & Applegart	Tenderloin, San Francisco	
c. 1912–1913	Spreckels Mansion	MacDonald & Applegart	Pacific Heights, San Francisco	San Francisco Designated Landmark
1912	King George Hotel	MacDonald & Applegart	Union Square, San Francisco	
1911	Dr. Hartland Law House	MacDonald & Applegart	San Francisco	
1908	4 Presidio Terrace	MacDonald & Applegart	San Francisco	
1908	3 Presidio Terrace	MacDonald & Applegart	San Francisco	
