= Spreckels Mansion (San Francisco) =

American French Baroque mansion, located in San Francisco, California

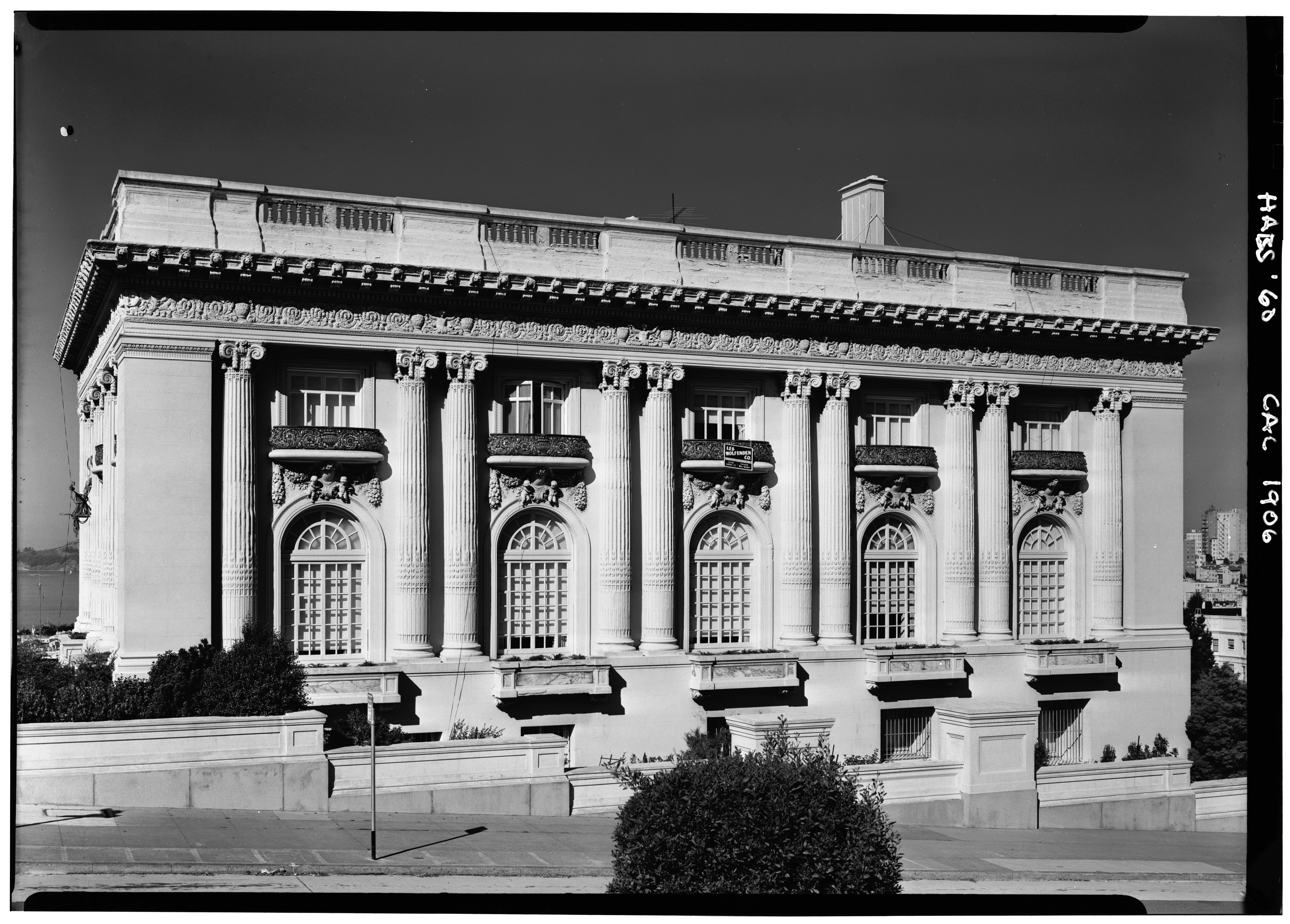
- (1960)

- Location within San Francisco County

General information
- Type: Mansion
- Location: 2080 Washington Street; San Francisco, California
- Coordinates: 37.7927°N 122.4275°W
- Completed: c.1912–1913
- Owner: Adolph B. Spreckels, Alma de Bretteville Spreckels, Alma Emma and Dorothy Spreckels, Danielle Steel

Technical details
- Floor count: 3

Design and construction
- Architects: George A. Applegarth, Kenneth A. MacDonald Jr.

San Francisco Designated Landmark
- Designated: June 9, 1990
- Reference no.: 197

Spreckels Mansion is a French Classical mansion located in the Pacific Heights neighborhood at 2080 Washington Street in San Francisco, California, built c. 1912–1913. The three-story mansion is in a French Baroque Chateau-style, designed by George Adrian Applegarth (1876–1972) and Kenneth A. MacDonald Jr. (of MacDonald & Applegarth firm), and built by businessman Adolph B. Spreckels. It is listed as city landmark No. 197.

== History ==
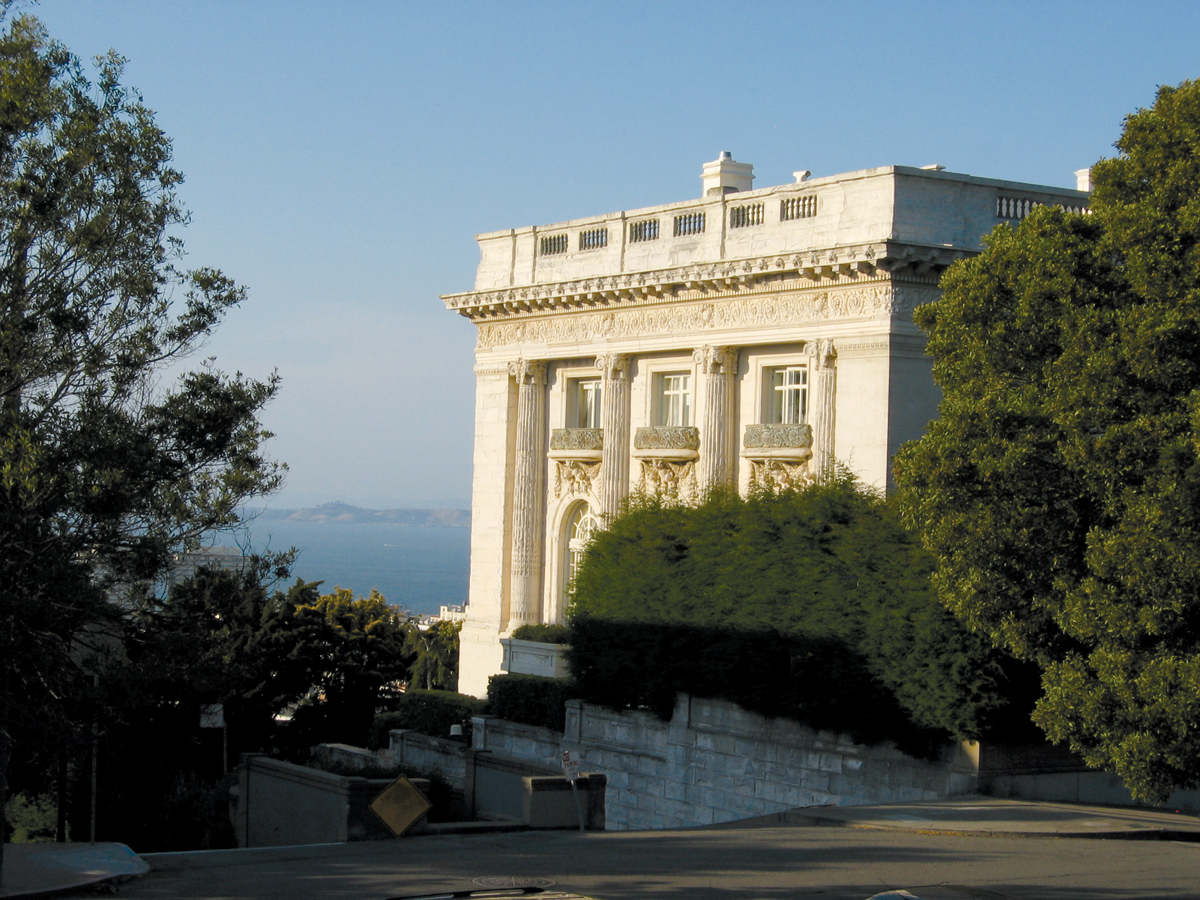
Spreckels Mansion, San Francisco (2004)

Adolph B. Spreckels was the son of sugar tycoon Claus Spreckels; he had helped expand the sugar business to Hawaii and Salinas. Adolph married Alma de Bretteville on May 11, 1908; she was many years younger than he was. The property for the Spreckels Mansion was bought by Adolph as a Christmas gift for his wife Alma; they had been living in Sausalito. To build the mansion they combined several prime lots, and eight Victorian homes were moved to Jackson and Washington Streets. The house was speculated to have cost around $1,000,000 to build in 1913 (equivalent to $36 million in 2025) and took two years to complete. At the time it was built, six counties were visible from the mansion's circular observatory: (San Mateo County, Santa Clara County, Alameda County, Contra Costa County and Marin County). There are still views of the San Francisco Bay from the mansion, and it is located across the street from Lafayette Park.

After the Spreckels Mansion was built, Alma went to Europe to stock the new house with 18th-century antiques. On this same trip Alma met with Auguste Rodin and brought 13 of his bronze sculptures to San Francisco for the 1915 Panama Pacific International Exposition, which later inspired the creation of the California Palace of the Legion of Honor. The suite for Alma de Bretteville Spreckels featured Louis XIV furniture and the suite for Adolph Spreckels featured Colonial Georgian furniture. The home reportedly features 55 rooms and a Louis XVI ballroom.

Adolph Spreckels died on June 28, 1924, and Alma inherited his empire and the mansion. Alma died in 1968, leaving the house to her two daughters. After 1968, the mansion was divided into four units. Danielle Steel purchased the property and restored it to a single family residence. Steel added a very tall hedge in front of the mansion blocking the architecture, for the sake of privacy.

The exteriors have been used for a few movies set in San Francisco; most extensively as the eponymous nightclub for the 1957 musical Pal Joey.

== See also ==
- List of San Francisco Designated Landmarks
