= Anjac Fashion Building =

Anjac Fashion Building may refer to the following buildings in Los Angeles's Broadway Theater and Commercial District:

- Ninth and Broadway Building
- Platt Building
- Western Costume Building
- Wurlitzer Building (California)

== See also ==
- List of contributing properties in the Broadway Theater and Commercial District
- Orpheum Theatre (Los Angeles), also owned by the Anjac Fashion Buildings company
