= Western Costume =

Hollywood costume company

Western Costume logo

Western Costume Company is a costume company founded in 1912 or 1913 by Louis Loss Burns, and located in North Hollywood, California, which supplies costumes and costuming supplies to the film and TV industry. It is one of the oldest businesses in the industry.

== History ==
Louis Loss Burns Harry Revier Jacob Stern Before founding Western Costume Company, L. L. Burns owned an Indian trading company in Los Angeles. His expertise on Native American culture and access to Native American artifacts made him a frequent source for filmmakers looking to outfit their Western pictures. After one production, producer William Fox tried to return the goods he'd purchased for his film as he no longer needed them. Recognizing the industry's need for a rental business, L. L. Burns founded Western Costume Company in 1912, and named it after the genre of films it dressed.

At the same time, Burns was also part owner of Burns & Revier Studio and Laboratory, a motion picture production space located in the stables of Hollywood real estate developer Jacob Stern. In 1913 Burns and his partner, Harry Revier, subleased Burns and Revier Studio and Laboratory to Samuel Goldwyn Cecil B. DeMille and Jesse L. Lasky for the film The Squaw Man. Goldwyn, DeMille and Lasky ultimately purchased the land for Jesse L. Lasky Feature Play Company, making it the home of what would soon become Paramount Pictures. Burns, now out of the studio game, also closed his trading goods store and focused solely on his costume company. He bought out the only other costume and prop company in town to augment his stock, and by 1923, Western Costume handled ninety-nine percent of the costuming business in Los Angeles.

After the stock market crashed in 1929, Burns struggled, and he was ultimately forced to sell the company in 1932. He became the head of the costume department at Warner Bros., where he stayed until his death. In order to be closer to the heart of the film industry, Western's new owners moved the company from downtown to Melrose Ave., directly adjacent to the Bronson Gate at Paramount. They sold the company after a couple of years to J.I. Schnitzer, a former RKO executive. Business boomed.

Costume house workers began joining the I.A.T.S.E. in the late 1930s, and Western was fully unionized by 1942. Schnitzer struggled to cover his payroll, and his health had begun to fail. He approached the heads of several major studios who, faced with the prospect of losing an industry pillar, agreed to purchase the company. For the following 45 years, Western was co-owned by Warner Bros., RKO, 20th Century-Fox, Columbia, Universal, and Republic. In 1988, Paramount purchased Western with the intent to sell the company and keep the land it occupied; they were eager to expand the southern border of their lot. It seemed like the historic costume company would shutter, but a group of buyers stepped in just before it went to auction. The company relocated to a facility in North Hollywood, where it has resided since 1990.

In addition to costume rentals, Western Costume houses four workrooms that produce custom-made hats, clothes, and shoes; a research library and archive; a costume supply store; fitting rooms; and dye areas.

The company sells costumes used in well known films at auction from time to time. The company generally only deals with studios and filmmakers but occasionally it opens its doors to the general public.

== Featured filmography ==
- The Squaw Man
- The Birth of a Nation
- Intolerance
- The Mark of Zorro
- Robin Hood
- The Hunchback of Notre Dame
- The Jazz Singer
- Frankenstein
- She Done Him Wrong
- Cleopatra
- Mutiny on the Bounty
- The Charge of the Light Brigade
- Marie Antoinette
- Juarez
- Gone with the Wind
- Stagecoach
- The Wizard of Oz
- Casablanca
- Gilda
- Miracle on 34th Street
- The Lone Ranger
- Samson and Delilah
- All About Eve
- An American in Paris
- Call Me Madam
- How to Marry a Millionaire
- Oklahoma!
- To Catch a Thief
- The King and I
- Porgy and Bess
- Some Like It Hot
- Psycho
- Spartacus
- The Alamo
- Flower Drum Song
- West Side Story
- Gypsy
- How the West Was Won
- Cleopatra
- Whatever Happened to Baby Jane?
- The Sound of Music
- Star Trek: The Original Series
- Planet of the Apes
- Butch Cassidy and the Sundance Kid
- Hello, Dolly!
- Patton
- Papillon
- The Sting
- The Exorcist
- Chinatown
- Little House on the Prairie
- Roots
- The Jerk
- 9 to 5
- Raging Bull
- Raiders of the Lost Ark
- The Right Stuff
- The Natural
- North and South
- Steel Magnolias
- Dances with Wolves
- Dick Tracy
- Edward Scissorhands
- Bugsy
- Dr. Quinn, Medicine Woman
- Forrest Gump
- Maverick
- Natural Born Killers
- The Shawshank Redemption
- The American President
- Batman and Robin
- The Sopranos
- Chocolat
- Miss Congeniality
- A Beautiful Mind
- Ocean's Eleven
- Zoolander
- Down with Love
- Elf
- Pirates of the Caribbean: The Curse of the Black Pearl
- Seabiscuit
- Lemony Snicket's A Series of Unfortunate Events
- The Aviator
- Mad Men
- There Will Be Blood
- Milk
- The Hurt Locker
- Boardwalk Empire
- True Grit
- The Man in the High Castle
- 12 Years a Slave
- Dunkirk
- The Greatest Showman
- The Ballad of Buster Scruggs
- Green Book
- Once Upon a Time in Hollywood
- Blonde
- 1923
