= Hillwood =

Hillwood may refer to:

- Hillwood, Tasmania, Australia
- Hillwood Volcano Tasmania, Australia
- Amanda Hillwood, British actress
- Hillwood Estate, Museum & Gardens in Washington, D.C., United States
- Hillwood Comprehensive High School in Nashville, Tennessee, United States
- Hillwood Academic Day School in San Francisco, California, United States
- Hillwood (album) by South Park Mexican
- Hillwood, Washington, a fictional city from the animated series Hey Arnold!

== See also ==
- Hill-Wood baronets
