= Haas–Lilienthal House =

Historic house in California, United States

- U.S. National Register of Historic Places
- San Francisco Designated Landmark
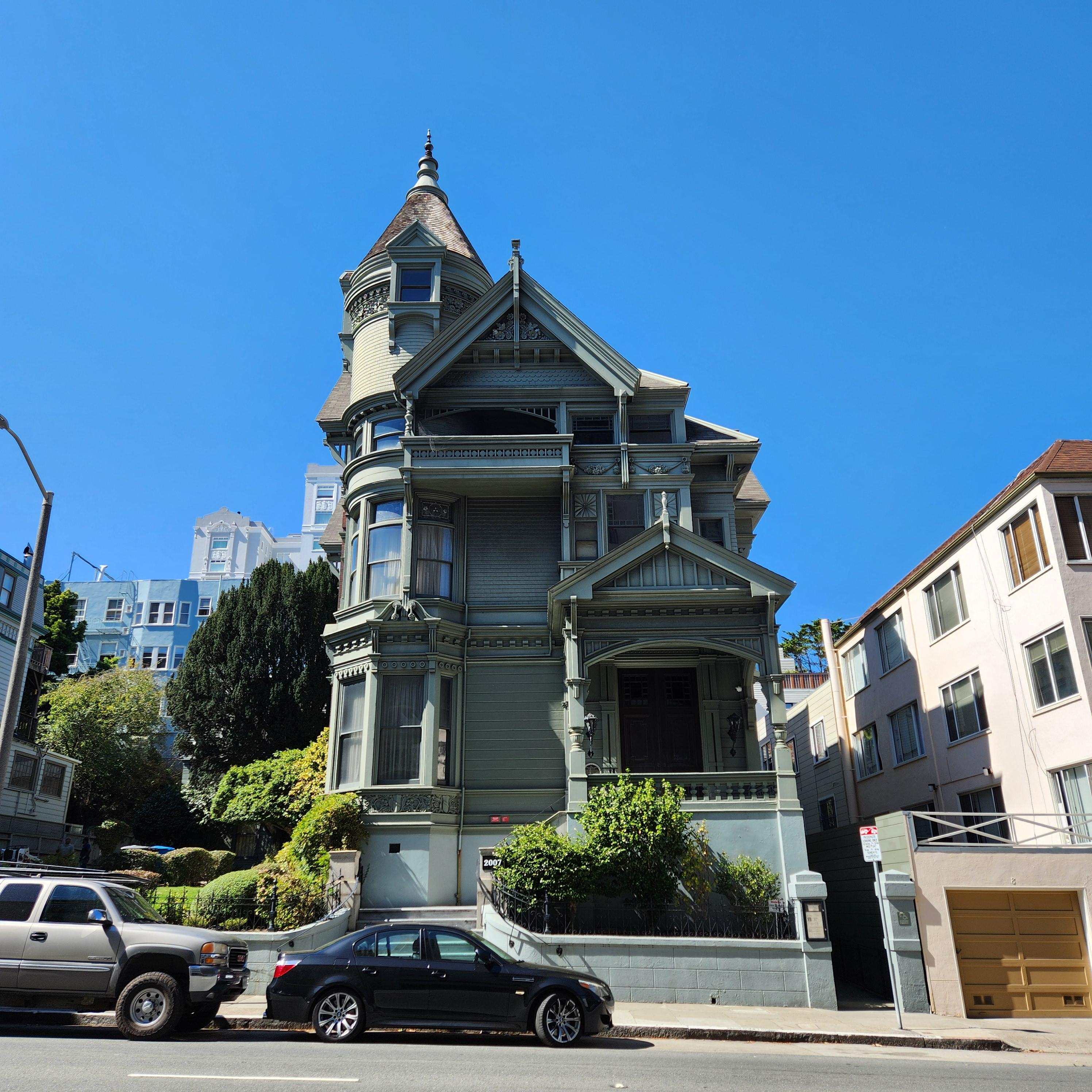
- Haas–Lilienthal House in 2025

- Location within San Francisco County Location within California Location within the United States
- Location: San Francisco County, California
- Coordinates: 37°47′34.83″N 122°25′28.52″W
- Built: 1886
- Architect: Peter Schmidt
- Architectural style: Queen Anne - Eastlake
- NRHP reference No.: 73000438
- SFDL No.: 69

Significant dates
- Added to NRHP: July 2, 1973
- Designated SFDL: January 4, 1975

The Haas–Lilienthal House is a historic building located at 2007 Franklin Street in San Francisco, California, United States, within the Pacific Heights neighborhood. Built in 1886 for William and Bertha Haas, it survived the 1906 San Francisco earthquake and subsequent fire. The Victorian era house is a San Francisco Designated Landmark and is listed on the U.S. National Register of Historic Places. It was donated to the nonprofit organization San Francisco Heritage (formerly the Foundation for San Francisco's Architectural Heritage) in 1973 and converted into a museum with period furniture and artifacts, which as of 2016 received over 6,500 visitors annually.

== History ==
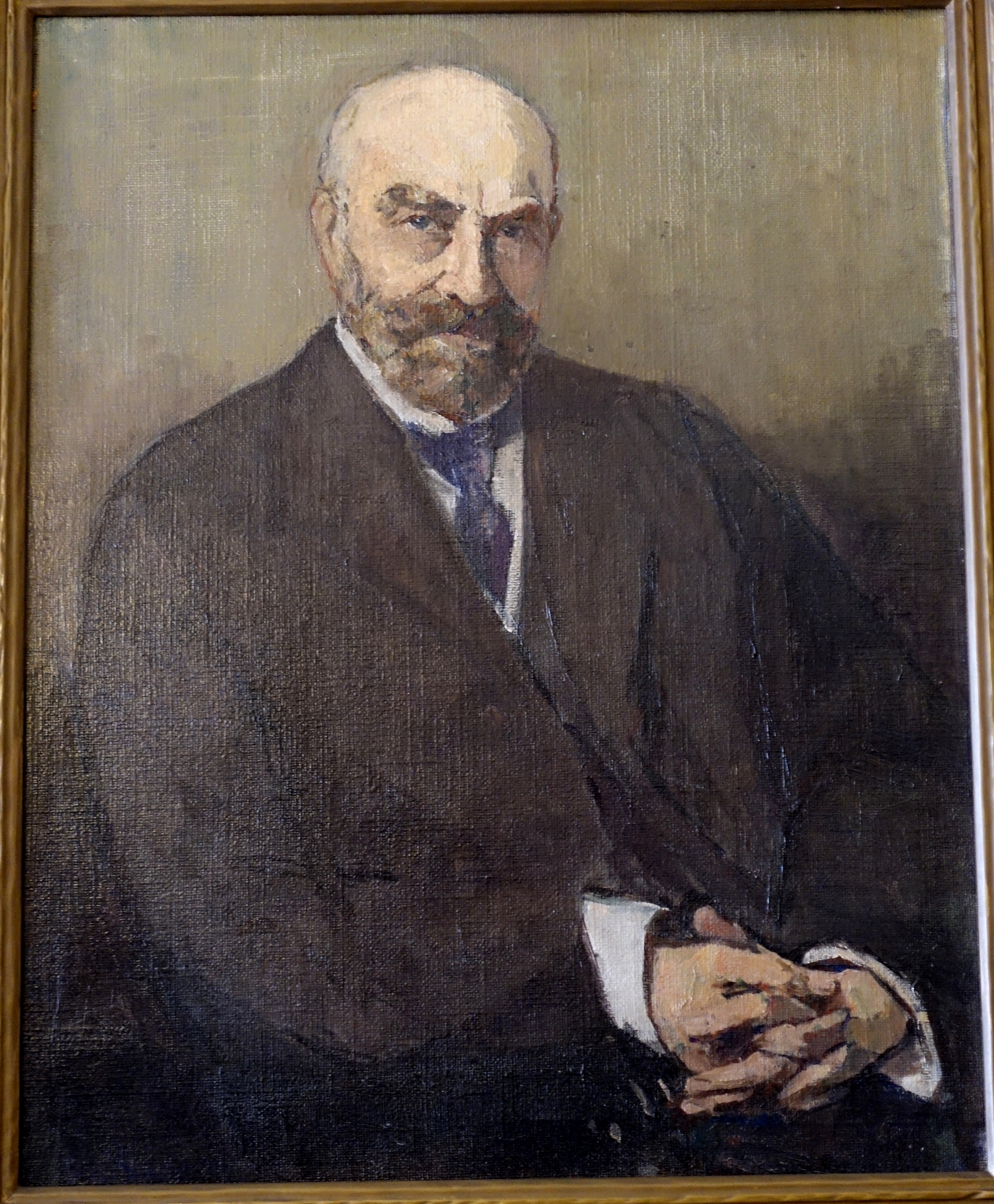
Portrait of merchant William Haas

The House was built for merchant William Haas (brother of Abraham Haas), his wife Bertha Greenebaum, and their children Florine, Charles Williams and Alice. William Haas (1849–1916) was born in Reckendorf, Bavaria from a Jewish family and came to San Francisco in October 1868, rapidly establishing himself as a successful businessman. In 1880 he married Bertha Greenebaum (1861–1927), whose father Herman, owner of a prosperous mercantile company in California, was also from Bavaria. Well integrated within the affluent local Bavarian Jewish community, the couple lived in a number of different residences after their marriage before finally building a grand mansion for themselves and their children. Haas entrusted Bavarian architect Peter R. Schmidt and contractors McCann & Biddell to build his home in 1886.

The house withstood the 1906 earthquake with only slight damage. However, the home was threatened by the devastating fire which followed the earthquake and destroyed about 40% of San Francisco. The Haas family watched the fire from the roof of their house, but was soon forced to evacuate by city authorities. So the family, along with most other San Francisco residents, went to the nearest public park, Lafayette Park, to camp out during the emergency. Three days after the earthquake the fire was finally stopped at Van Ness Avenue, narrowly sparing the house from destruction.

The 1928 addition — living quarters over a garage — were built by architect Gardner Dailey to provide needed space for the additions to the family.

Three generations of Haas and Lilienthal descendants lived at 2007 Franklin Street, with preserved interiors that reflect over 86 years as a family home. In 1972 Alice Haas-Lilienthal died, after having resided in the house for nearly eighty years; the following year, her children donated the mansion to San Francisco Heritage (known at the time as the Foundation for San Francisco's Architectural Heritage), a non-profit organization.

The Haas–Lilienthal House was added to the U.S. National Register of Historic Places on July 2, 1973, and designated as a San Francisco Landmark on January 4, 1975. In 2012 it was named a National Treasure by the National Trust for Historic Preservation.

=== Haas–Lilienthal House Museum ===
In 1972, the Haas–Lilienthal House was opened to the public for tours. It is the only intact Victorian private home in the city that is open regularly as a museum, complete with original furniture and artifacts. Volunteer docents lead tours of the house which begin in the basement ballroom. The first floor, and the original principal bedchamber, one other bedchamber, a nursery, and one bathroom on the second floor are included in the house tour. The third story, or attic, which contained a spacious redwood-paneled playroom, gym, storage room, and servants' quarters for the cook and maids, started serving as offices and a library when the nonprofit organization San Francisco Heritage became stewards of the property, and until 2023 served as the residence of the house manager. The 1928 living quarters addition over the garage is a rented residence.

In November 2023, citing financial difficulties, SF Heritage closed the museum and terminated three of its four employees, envisaged a reopening for spring 2024. In May 2024, the organization resumed public tours at the Haas-Lilienthal House and celebrated the return of publicly-accessible events by hosting a large public book sale and open house in support of its historic preservation mission. As of July 2026, the Haas-Lilienthal House is available for private event rentals in addition to SF Heritage public events and house tours.

== Architecture ==
The house was built in the Victorian Queen Anne - Eastlake style. Built of redwood, the building follows the locally popular row-house plan, developed to maximise the use of space in deep, narrow hillside lots.

The 11,500 square foot house was designed by Peter R. Schmidt. The house stayed in the family until 1973, when the surviving children of the last owner entrusted it to The Foundation for San Francisco's Architectural Heritage (now SF Heritage). They made the Hass-Lilienthal House into their headquarters and converted it into offices, a house museum, and a venue for private events.

== Gallery ==
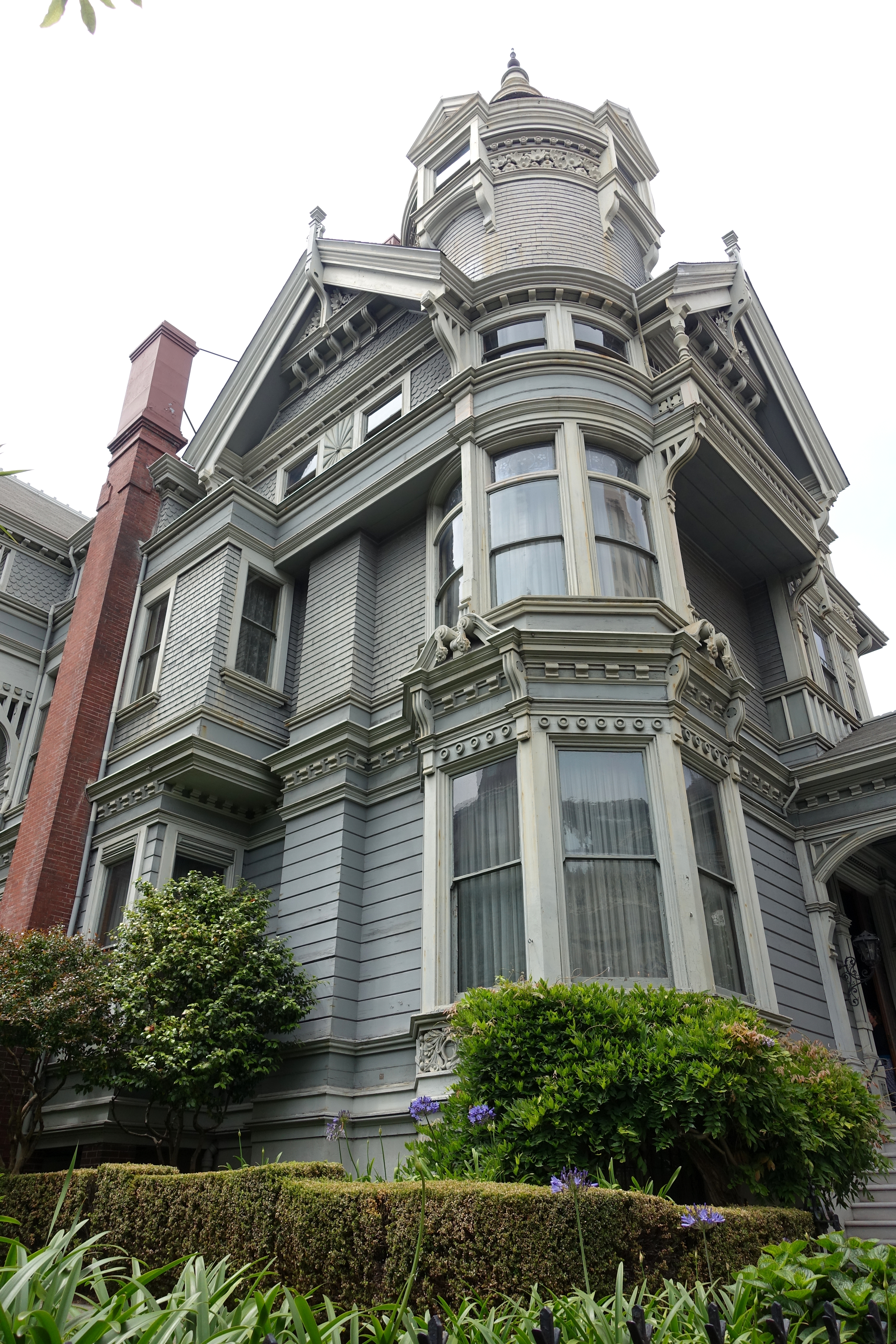

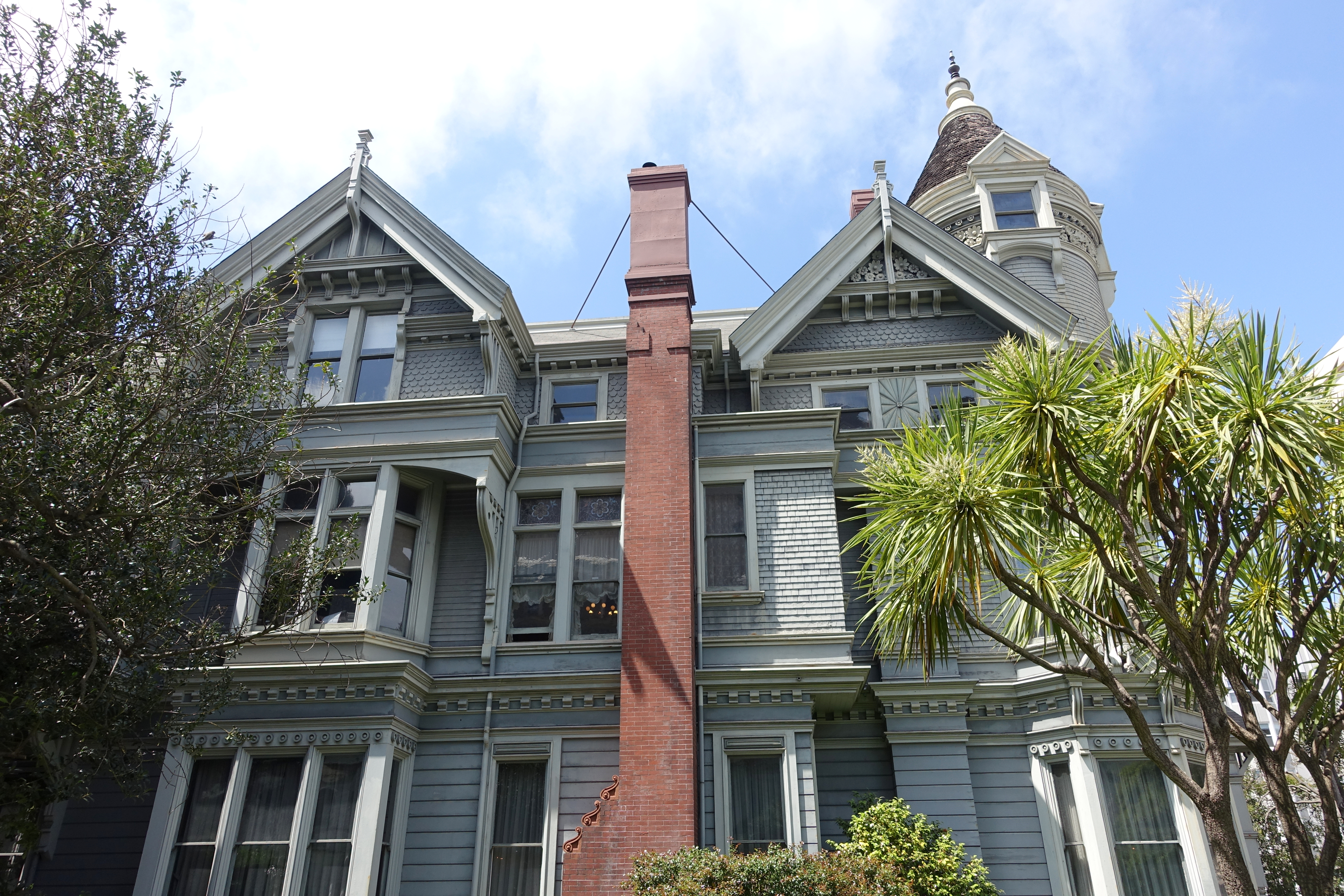

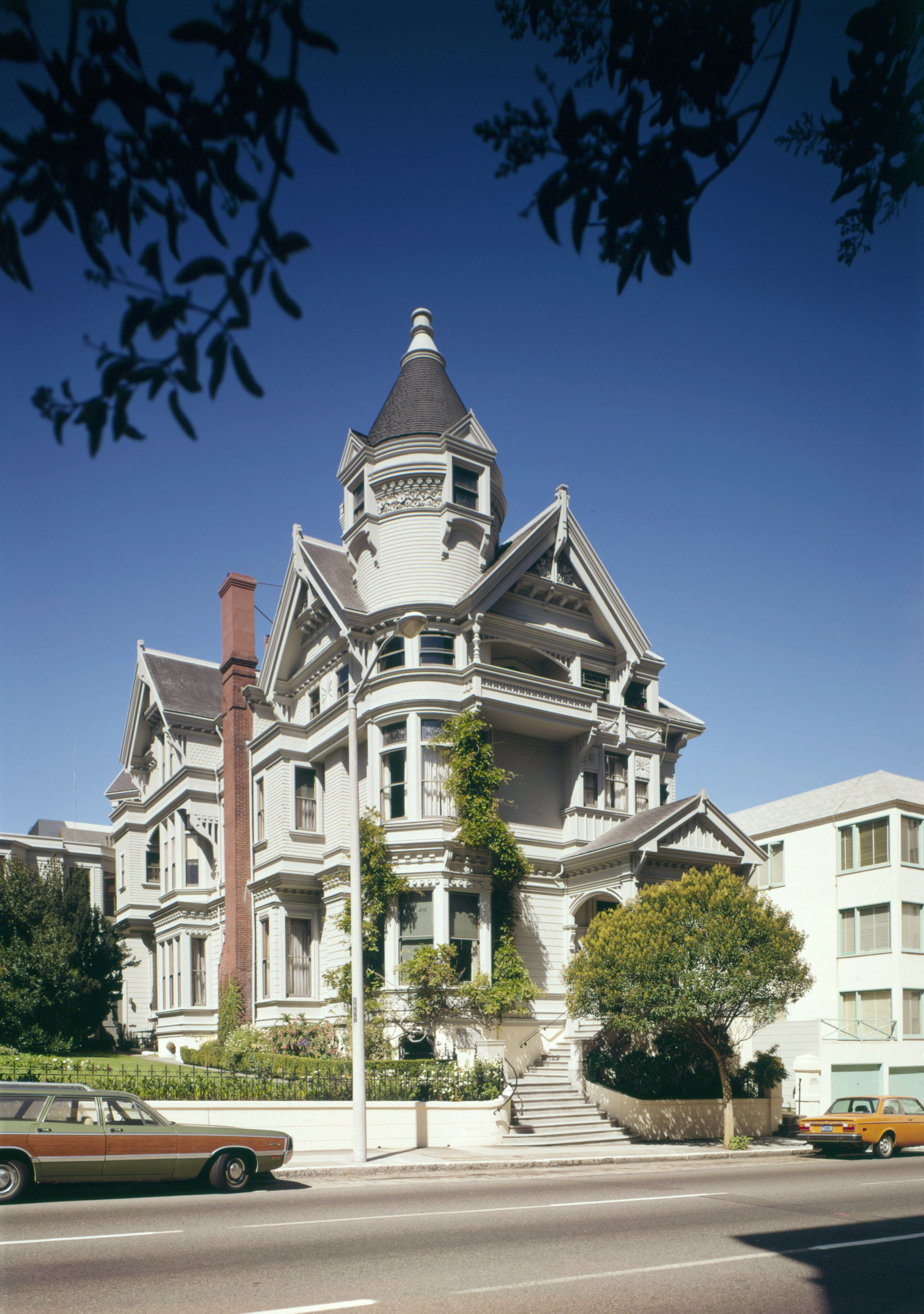

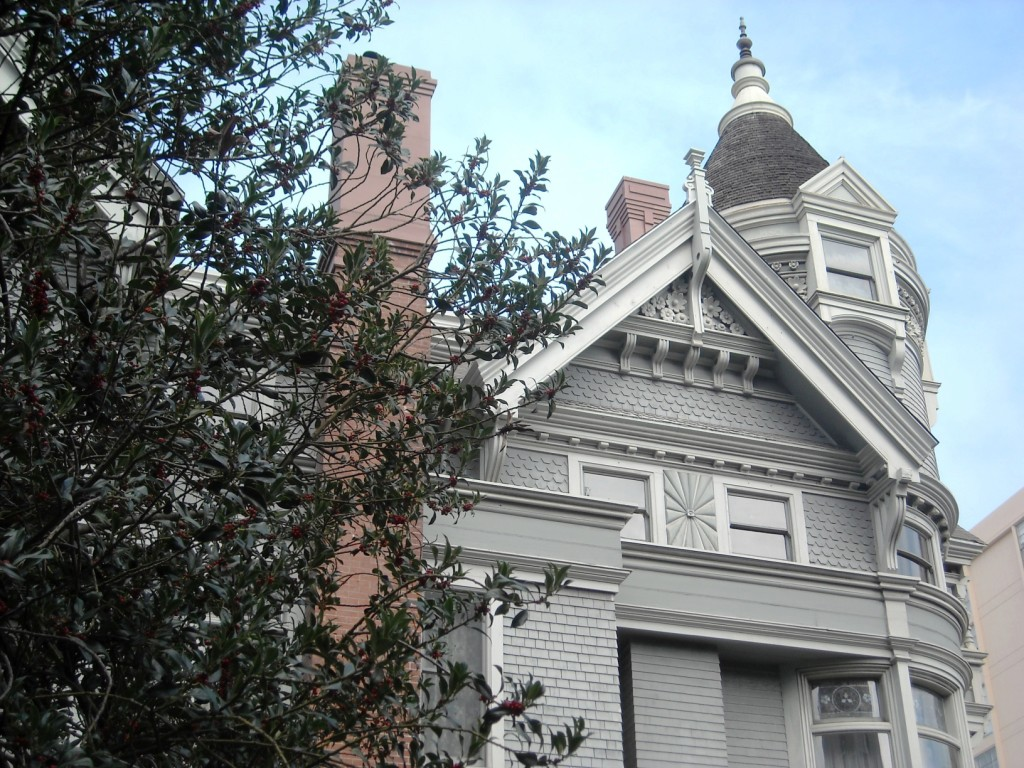

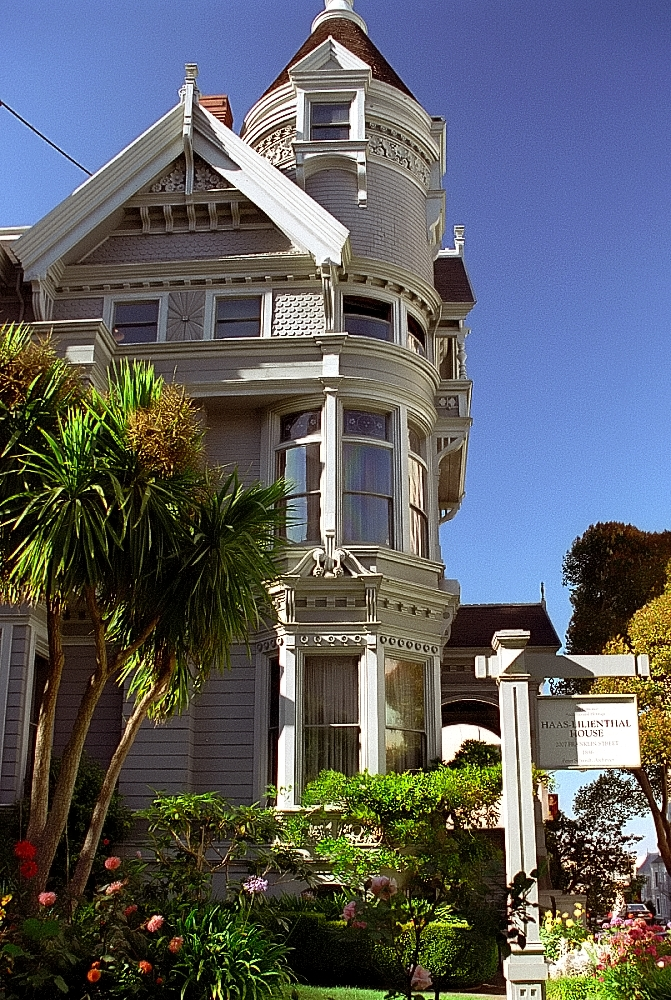
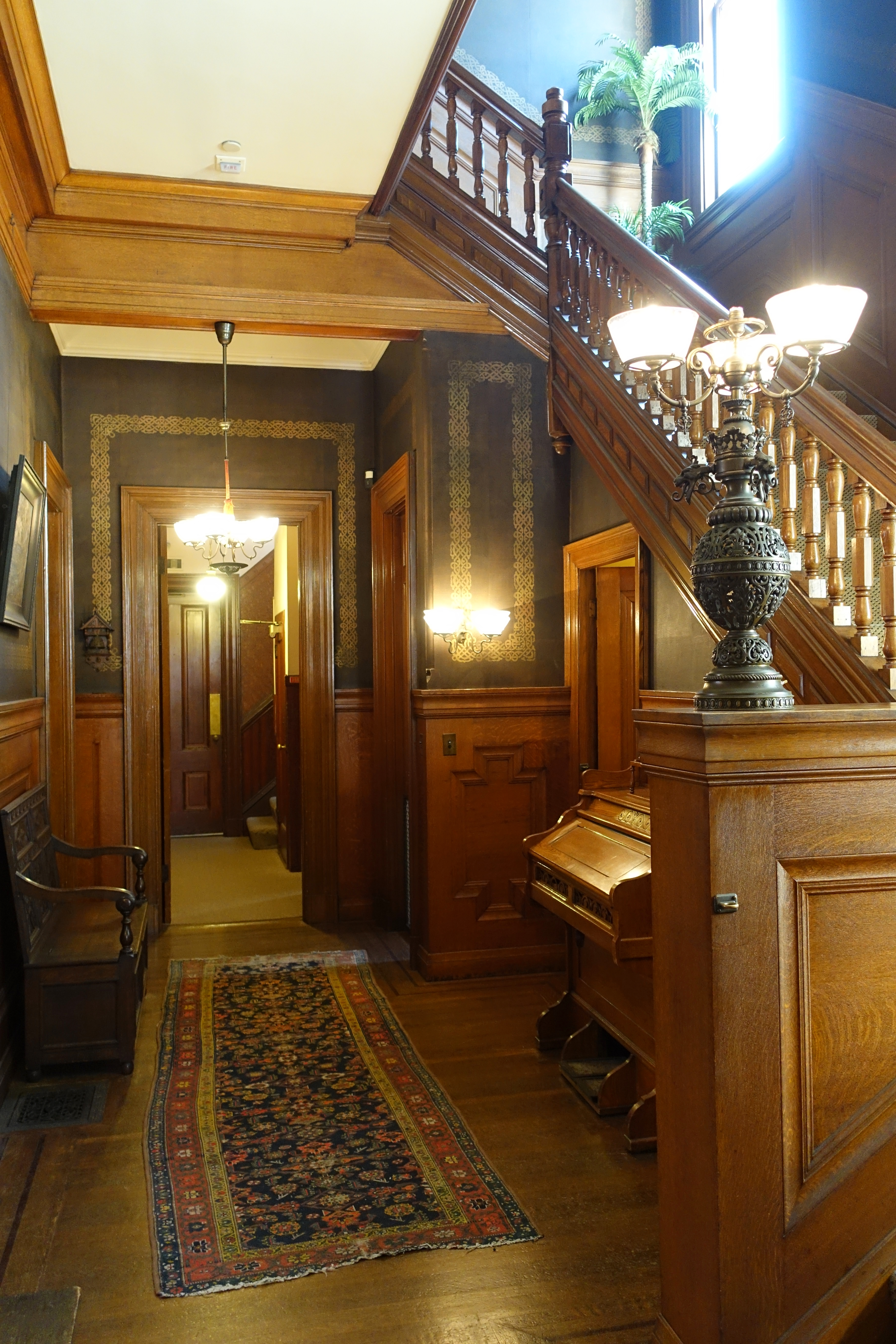
First floor hallway

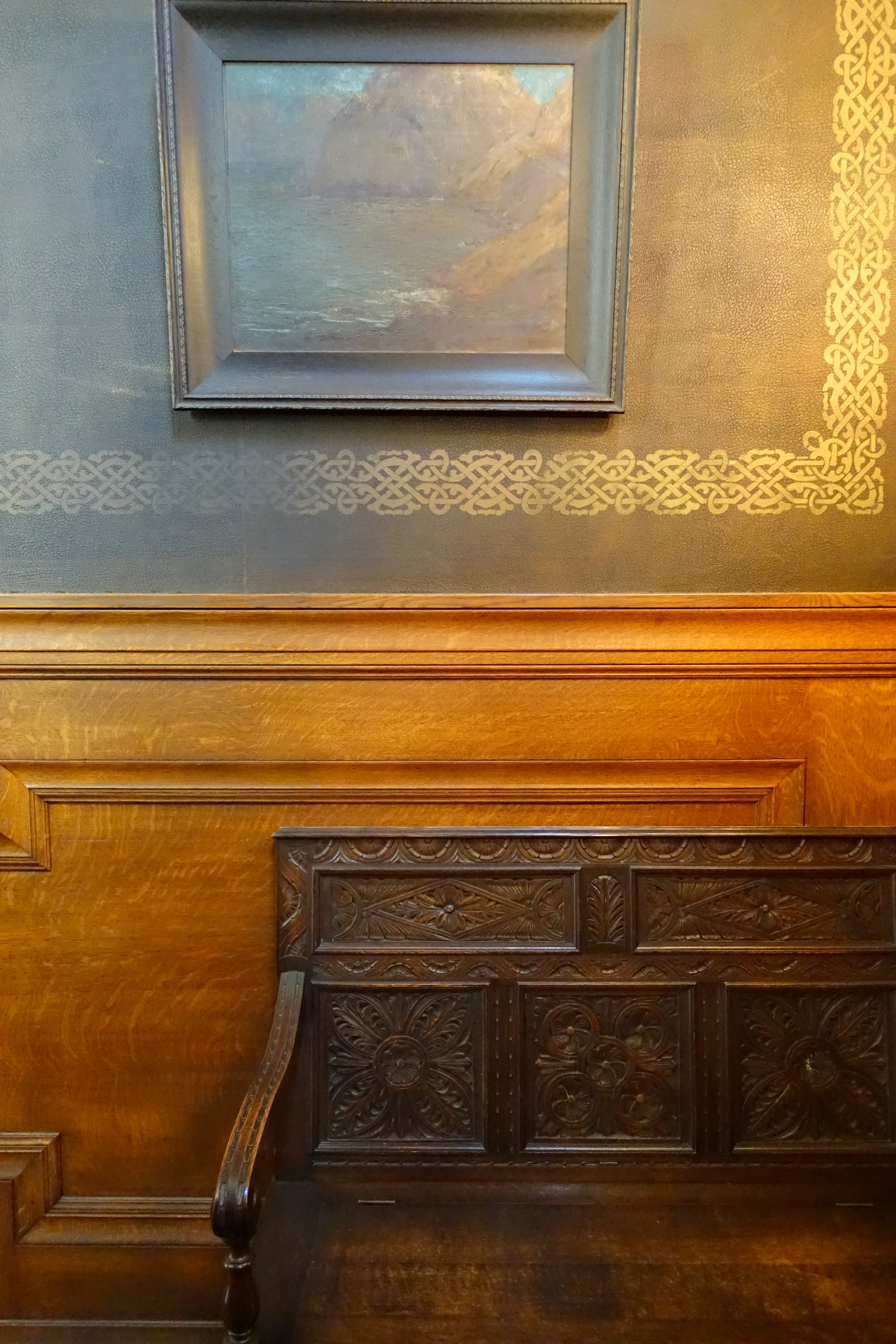
First floor hall detail

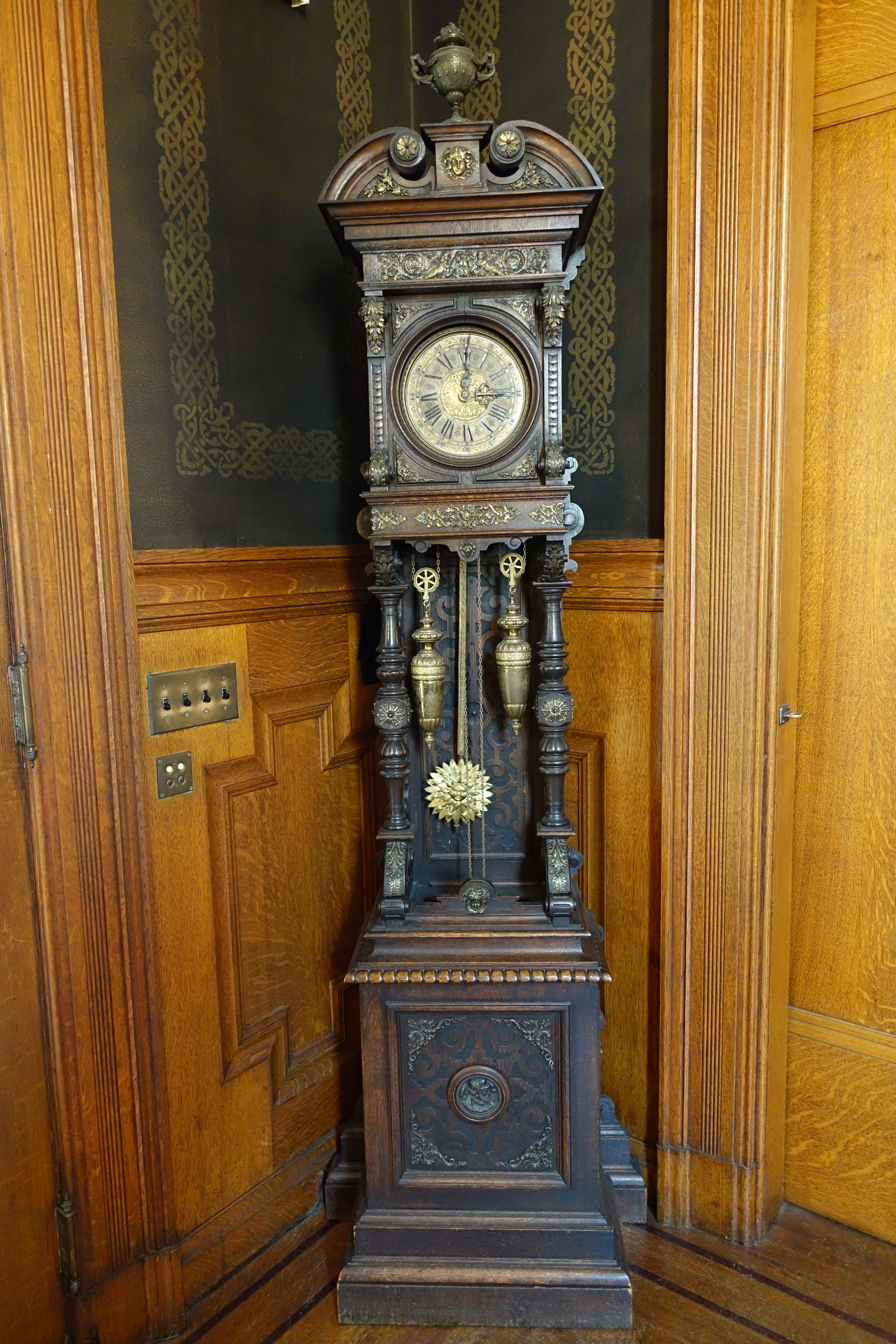
Hallway clock

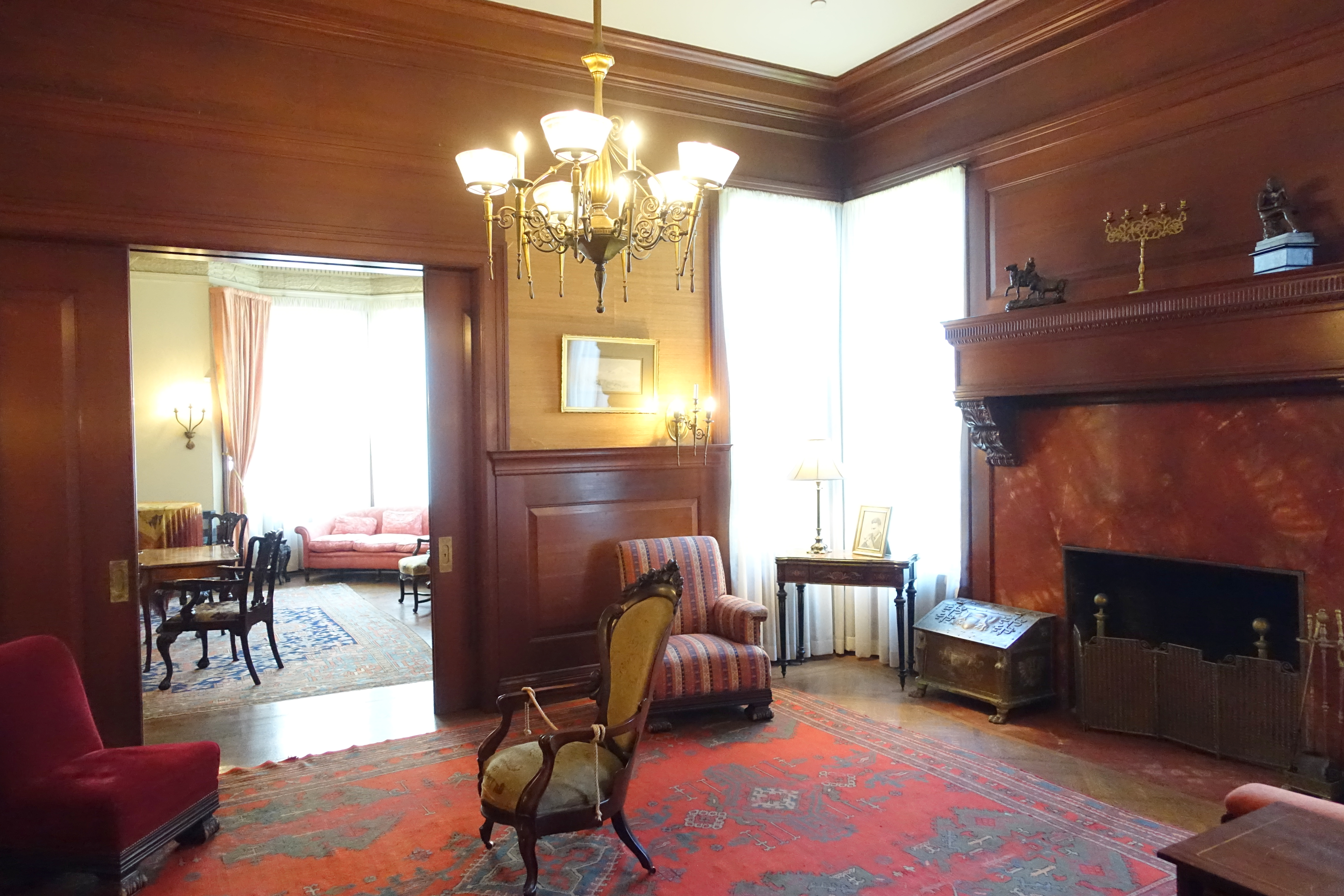
second floor parlor

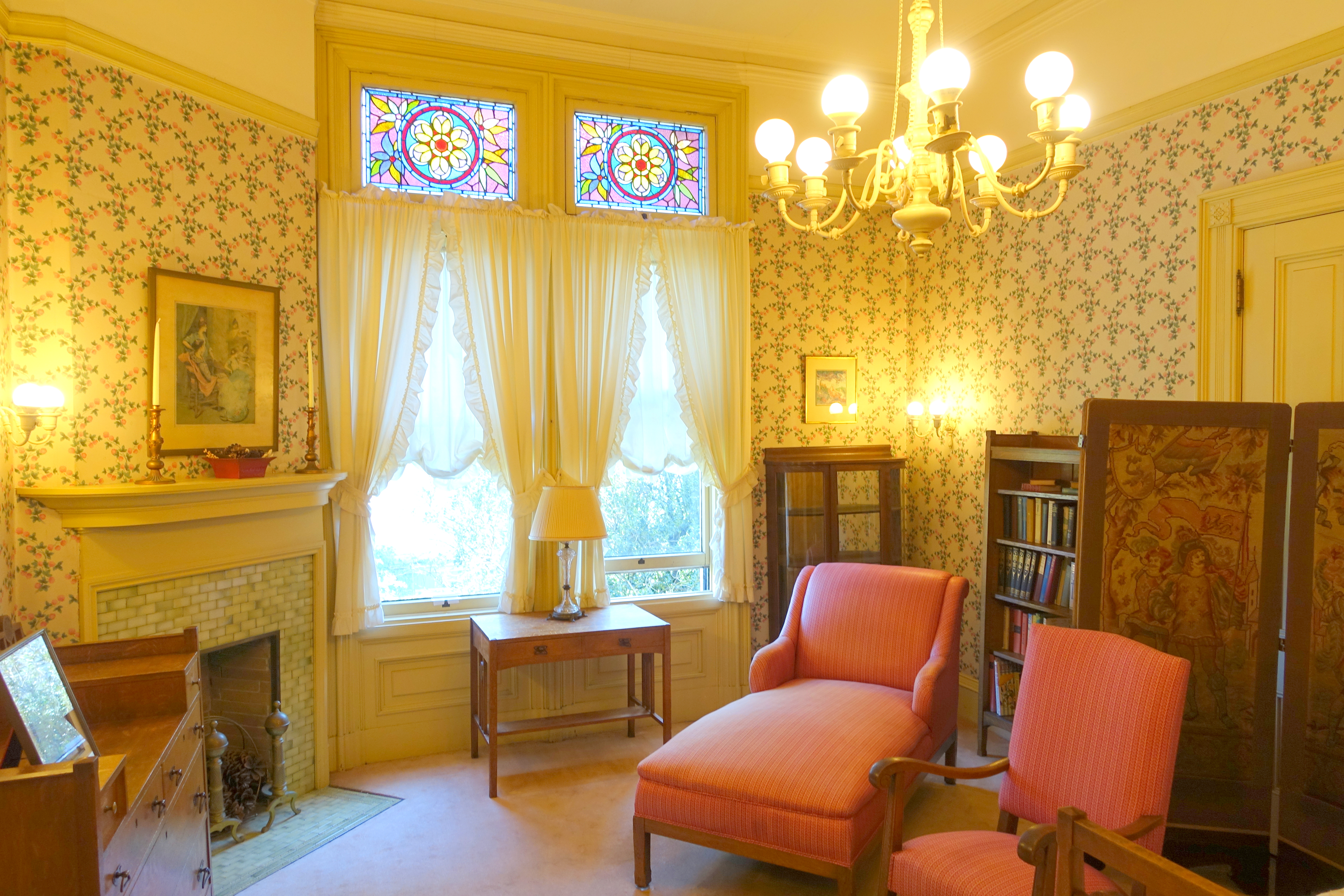
Back Bedroom

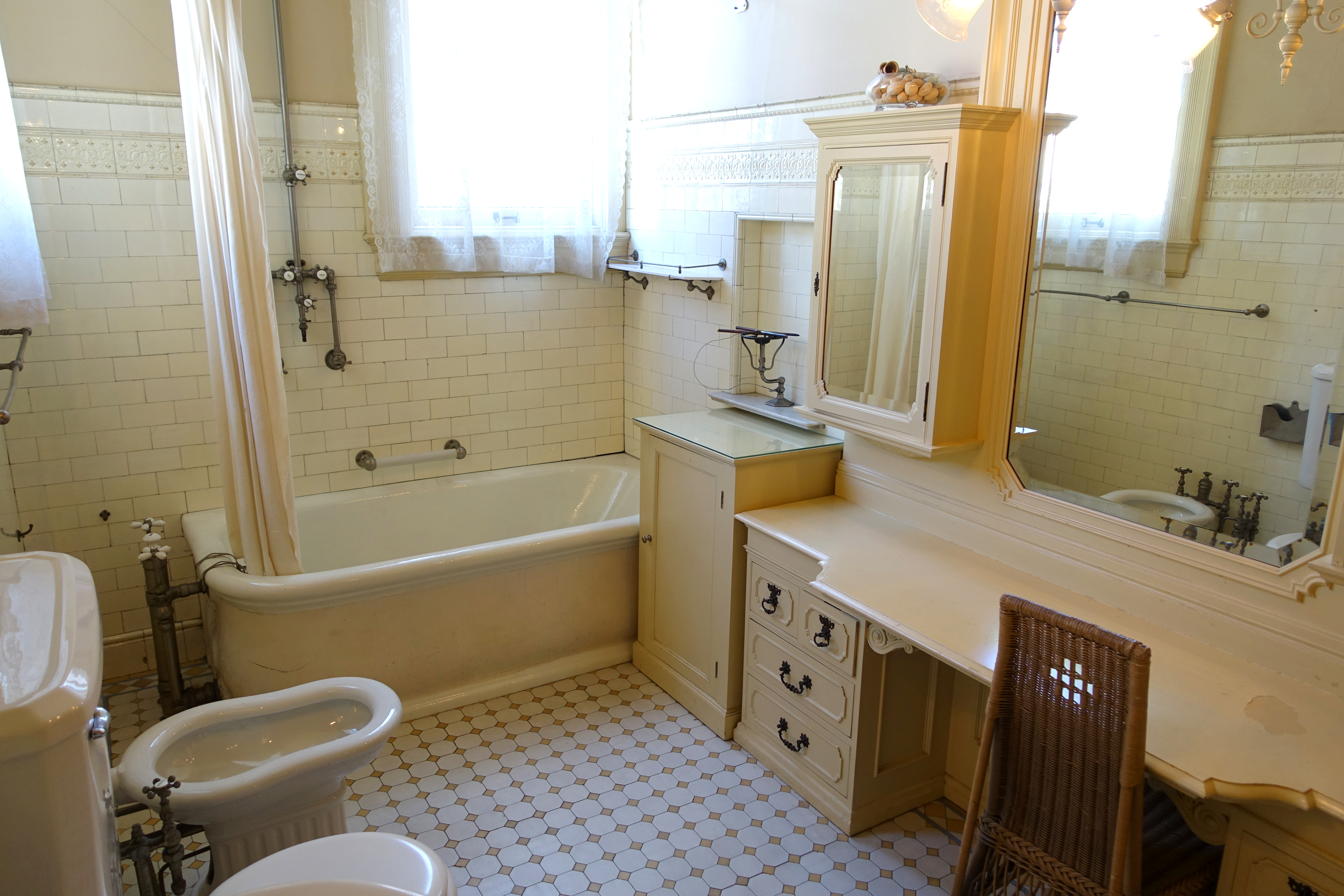
Bathroom

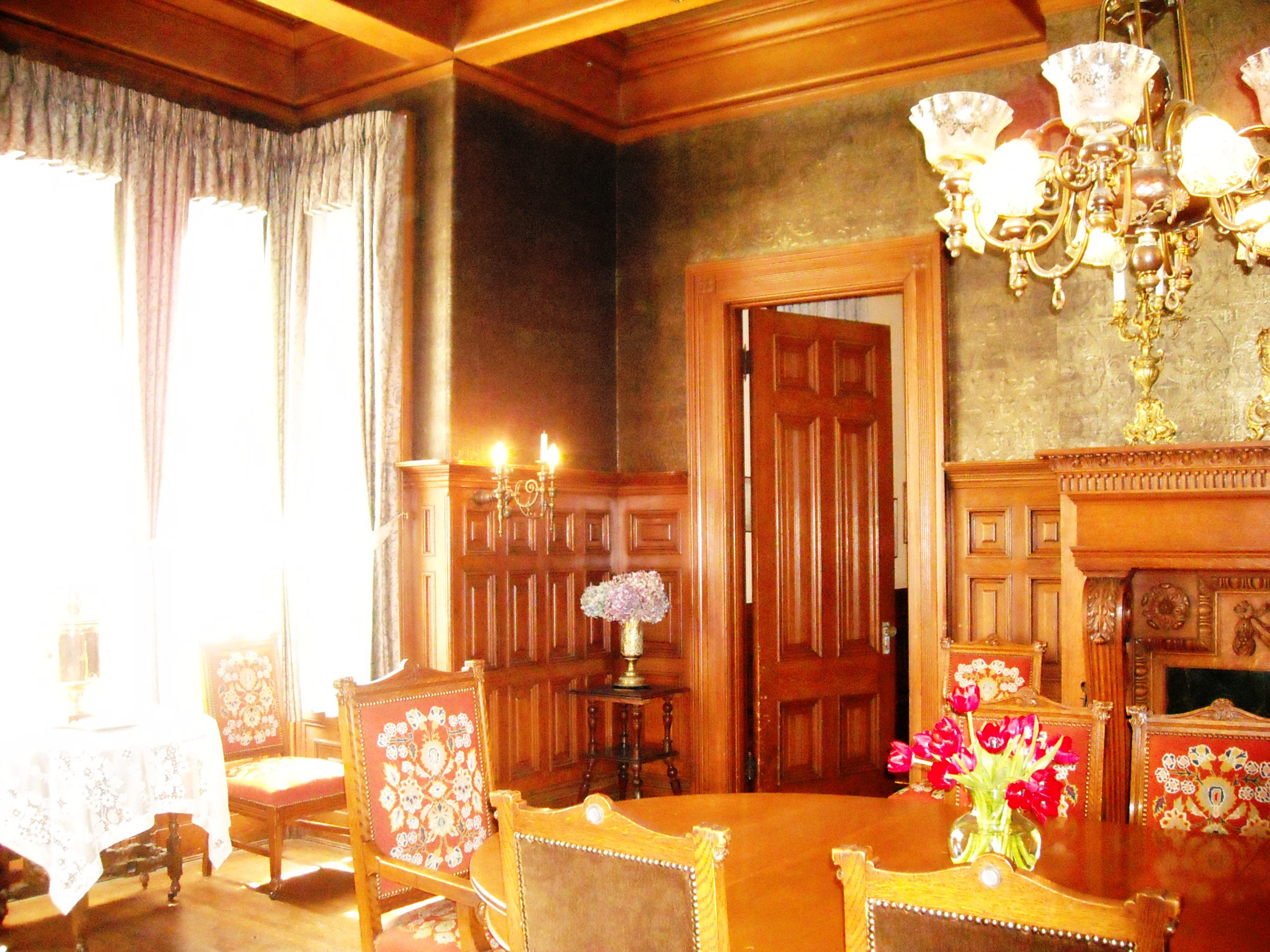
Dining Room

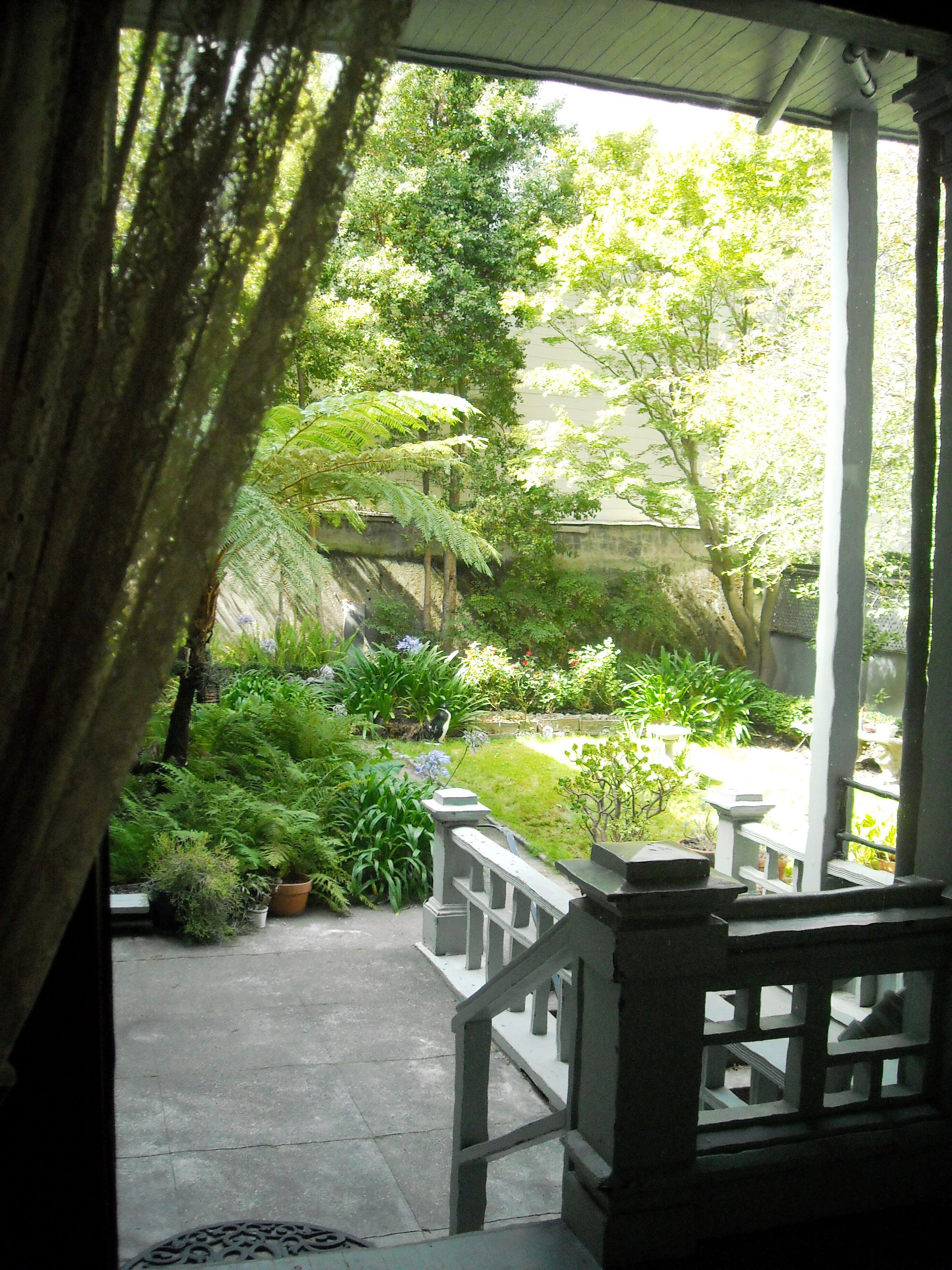
Garden

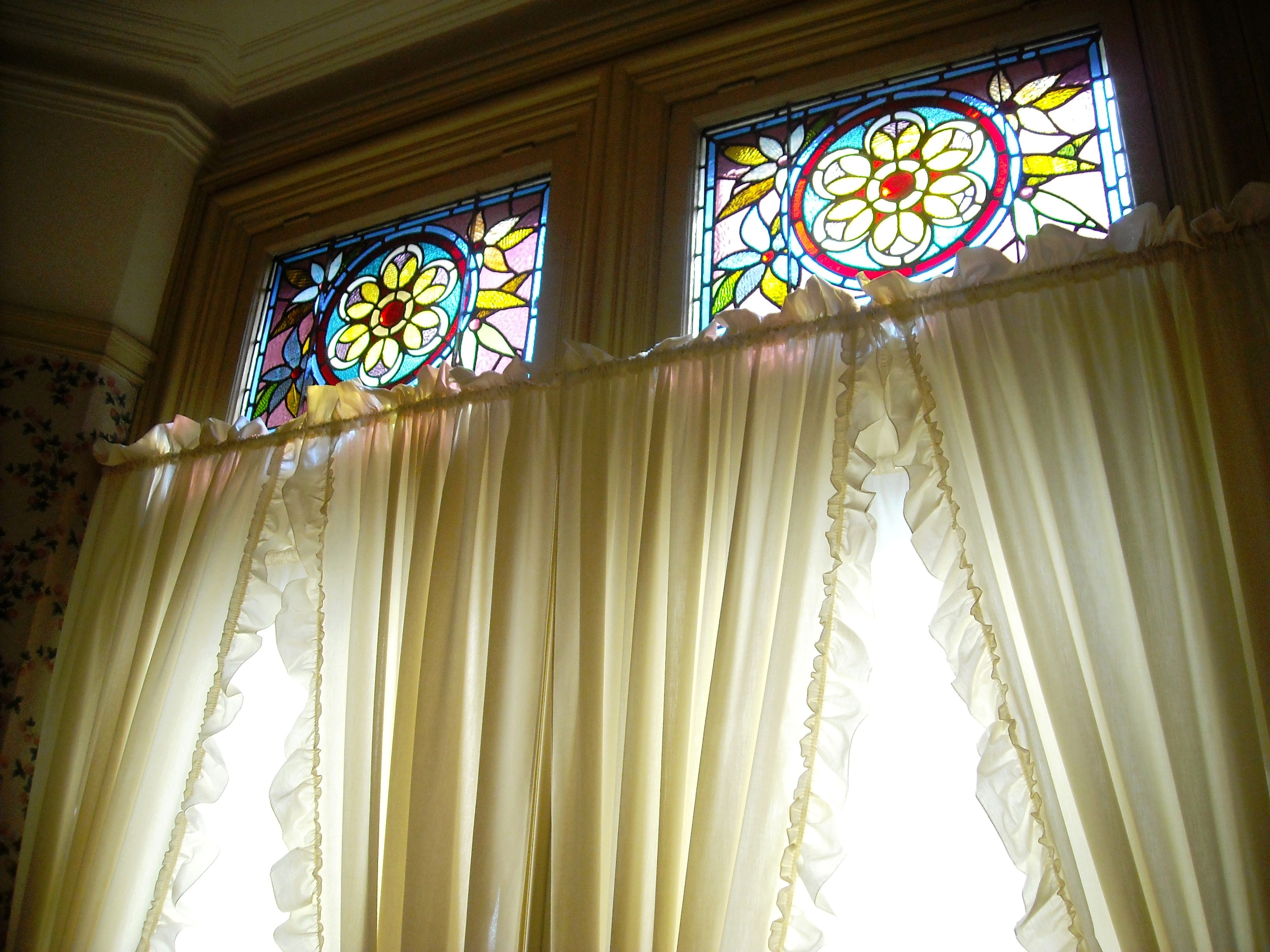
Stained glass on the windows

== See also ==
- List of San Francisco Designated Landmarks
