= A Very Peculiar Practice =

- Written by: Andrew Davies
- Directed by: David Tucker
- Starring: Peter Davison; Graham Crowden; David Troughton; Barbara Flynn; Amanda Hillwood; John Bird; Michael J. Shannon; Joanna Kanska
- Country of origin: United Kingdom
- No. of series: 2
- No. of episodes: 15

Production
- Producer: Ken Riddington
- Running time: 50 minutes

Original release
- Network: BBC2
- Release: 21 May 1986 – 6 September 1992

A Very Peculiar Practice is a British surreal black-comedy drama set in the health centre of a university, produced by the BBC, which ran for two series in 1986 and 1988. The two series were followed by a 90-minute made-for-television film, A Very Polish Practice (1992), following some of the characters to a new setting in Poland.

A Very Peculiar Practice was written by Andrew Davies and was inspired by his experiences as a lecturer at the University of Warwick, and it has been interpreted as a commentary on contemporary trends in education. It was one of only two original television series that he wrote.

In 2010, The Guardian ranked the series at number five in their list of "The Top 50 TV Dramas of All Time".

== Storyline ==
The series is a black comedy with surreal elements about an idealistic young doctor, Stephen Daker (Peter Davison), joining a university medical centre staffed by an ill-assorted group of doctors. These include the bisexual, ultra-feminist Rose Marie (Barbara Flynn), scheming to advance her career; brash, unempathetic Bob Buzzard (David Troughton), with his latest get-rich-quick scheme; and their leader, the genial but decrepit Scot Jock McCannon (Graham Crowden), with his ever-present bottle of whisky. Stephen Daker's predecessor is said to have left in dubious circumstances.

Most episodes begin in the same way. The camera pans across the college campus in the early morning, where a red dustbin lorry is seen, along with a pair of nuns, who do something odd each time - including playing hopscotch, carrying what is either a shop window dummy or a dead body wrapped in brown paper, or stealing the dustbin lorry. The nuns are only mentioned by the other characters once, very briefly, in Series 1 Episode 5.

A leitmotif is the commercialisation of higher education in Britain following the government cuts of the early 1980s, with the Vice-Chancellor Ernest Hemmingway (John Bird) trying to woo Japanese investors in the face of resistance from the academic old guard. Hugh Grant made one of his first television appearances as an evangelical preacher; Kathy Burke also had a bit part. In the second series, an American Vice-Chancellor, Jack Daniels (Michael J. Shannon), took over from Hemmingway, continuing the running joke of naming the VC after a famous American (although the whiskey distiller's name was Jack Daniel).

In the first series, Daker had a romance with a post-graduate policewoman, Lyn Turtle (Amanda Hillwood), after she rescued him from drowning in the swimming pool. In the second series Daker has been promoted to head of the centre, and falls in love with Polish academic Grete Grotowska (Joanna Kanska). Rose Marie also seeks romantic involvement with Grotowska, whilst at the same time sleeping with the VC Jack Daniels in her bid to oust Daker and become head of the medical centre herself. There is further complication when Mrs Daniels informs Rose Marie, who is her doctor, that she thinks her husband is having an affair.

In the sequel television film, A Very Polish Practice (1992), Daker and Grete live together in Poland, where he struggles with the former Communist country's antiquated health service. Grete encounters an ex-lover (Tadeusz Melnik, played by Alfred Molina), who helped her get out of Poland and to whom she had promised herself out of gratitude. She battles to decide whether to stay with Stephen and their child or to go with Melnik (with or without the child), confessing that she still loves him as well as Stephen. The idea for the second series was said to have come from the actress Joanna Kanska, who played Grete. Melnik eventually gives the couple his blessing.

== Production ==
Lowlands University (the fictional institution at which the series was set) was based on the University of East Anglia campus near Norwich.

The production wanted to film location sequences at UEA and also feature its campus skyline in the opening title sequence (which depicts an "apocalyptic vision of a university" which is then "illuminated by love") but the university was sensitive about its image and wary of television portrayals of universities in the wake of the 1981 TV adaptation of Malcolm Bradbury's The History Man, and so declined to be involved.

The locations for the series' filmed sequences were the universities of Keele and Birmingham. Most episodes of series 1 begin with sequences shot from the roof of the Arts Building tower at Birmingham, revealing the distinctive Ashley and Strathcona Buildings as the refuse truck drives along Ring Road North past the School of Education building and sometimes past residential block D at Keele. The scenes involving the lake were shot in the vicinity of the Vale halls of residence at Birmingham; the buildings that can be seen around the lake were demolished and replaced with modern student residences in 2006. Also used for exterior filming was the BT engineer training school at Yarnfield Park in Staffordshire. Most of the interiors were shot at BBC Pebble Mill (first series) and London (second), in the common combined film/video format.

The series had its genesis in writer Andrew Davies, then teaching at the University of Warwick, being commissioned and paid to write a series about three female mature students at university. By Davies' own admission, this idea "ran out of steam" after three scripts had been written and submitted; the BBC decided that it did not want to continue with the project and gave Davies the option of either paying back the money or writing a new series. Since Davies had already spent much of the money he realised there was only one avenue open to him, and A Very Peculiar Practice was subsequently written "quite quickly".

In a deliberate case of art imitating life, the final episode of the first series introduces a character named Ron Rust (Joe Melia), a writer who, for reasons that he does not quite understand, owes the BBC £17,000 and is trying to write a black comedy about a university to pay the debt. The Ron Rust character also appeared in Davies's A Few Short Journeys of the Heart (an adaptation of his short story collection Dirty Faxes), first shown in the Stages series on BBC2 on 10 August 1994.

The theme tune, "We Love You", was written by Dave Greenslade and performed by Elkie Brooks.

The first series was released on DVD (Region 2) in the UK in 2004. A DVD set of the first and second series, along with A Very Polish Practice, was released in the UK during October 2011. Davies novelised both series in A Very Peculiar Practice (1986, Coronet) and A Very Peculiar Practice: The New Frontier (1988, Methuen).

== Cast ==
| Actor | Character | Series 1 | | | | | | | Series 2 | | | | | | | Film |
| Actor | Character | 1 | 2 | 3 | 4 | 5 | 6 | 7 | 1 | 2 | 3 | 4 | 5 | 6 | 7 | Film |
|---|---|---|---|---|---|---|---|---|---|---|---|---|---|---|---|---|
| Peter Davison | Dr Stephen Daker | | | | | | | | | | | | | | | |
| Graham Crowden | Dr Jock McCannon | | | | | | | | | | | | | | | |
| David Troughton | Dr Robert "Bob" Buzzard | | | | | | | | | | | | | | | |
| Barbara Flynn | Dr Rose Marie | | | | | | | | | | | | | | | |
| Amanda Hillwood | Lyn Turtle | | | | | | | | | | | | | | | |
| Joanna Kanska | Grete Grotowska | | | | | | | | | | | | | | | |
| Lindy Whiteford | Nurse Maureen Gahagan | | | | | | | | | | | | | | | |
| John Bird | Ernest Hemmingway | | | | | | | | | | | | | | | |
| Takashi Kawahara | Chen Sung Yau | | | | | | | | | | | | | | | |
| James Grout | Professor George Bunn | | | | | | | | | | | | | | | |
| Michael J. Shannon | Jack Daniels | | | | | | | | | | | | | | | |
| Colin Stinton | Charlie Dusenberry | | | | | | | | | | | | | | | |
| Gillian Raine | Mrs Kramer | | | | | | | | | | | | | | | |
| Joe Melia | Ron Rust | | | | | | | | | | | | | | | |
| Kay Stonham | Daphne Buzzard | | | | | | | | | | | | | | | |
| Dominic Arnold | Sammy Limb | | | | | | | | | | | | | | | |
| Toria Fuller | Julie Daniels | | | | | | | | | | | | | | | |
| Frances White | Dorothy Hampton | | | | | | | | | | | | | | | |
| Thomas Wheatley | Professor Farris | | | | | | | | | | | | | | | |
| Elaine Turrell | Nuns | | | | | | | | | | | | | | | |
| Sonia Hart | Nuns | | | | | | | | | | | | | | | |

== Episodes ==
=== Series 1 ===
| No. | Title | Original release date |
|---|---|---|
| 1 | "A Very Long Way from Anywhere" | 21 May 1986 |
A fresh-faced young GP joins the medical practice at Lowlands University. He is soon disillusioned by his new colleagues, but is fortunate to be rescued from drowning by a nice research student.
| 2 | "We Love You: That's Why We're Here" | 28 May 1986 |
Stephen gives a disastrous speech at the welcome for new students, and soon has to start dealing with their sex lives. Featuring Hugh Grant and Peter Blake
| 3 | "Wives of Great Men" | 4 June 1986 |
Professor Furie (Timothy West) demands Stephen give him dexedrine so he can work harder.
| 4 | "Black Bob's Hamburger Suit" | 11 June 1986 |
Bob Buzzard tries to persuade his colleagues to start prescribing an experimental drug.
| 5 | "Contact Tracer" | 18 June 1986 |
Nongonococcal urethritis breaks out at Lowlands, which leads to some embarrassing conversations.
| 6 | "The Hit List" | 25 June 1986 |
The Vice-Chancellor wants to close a women's residence so it can be used by Japanese investors. But first he needs to discredit the warden (Jean Heywood).
| 7 | "Catastrophe Theory" | 2 July 1986 |
A trio of civil servants is sent to audit the university. Featuring Kathy Burke.

=== Series 2 ===
| No. | Title | Original release date |
|---|---|---|
| 1 | "The New Frontier" | 24 February 1988 |
Stephen is now head of the practice, there is a new medical centre, a new American Vice-Chancellor, but no girlfriend. He is accused of inappropriately touching a female academic during an examination.
| 2 | "Art and Illusion" | 2 March 1988 |
The Vice-Chancellor's wife wants an Art Gallery. Featuring Clive Swift, André Maranne, Tim Wylton and Simon Russell Beale.
| 3 | "May the Force Be with You" | 9 March 1988 |
Bob tries to turn the clinic into a massage parlour, Grete's boyfriend wants to kill her, Rose Marie starts a male sexuality group and the campus is invaded by animal rightists. Featuring Tim Preece and Chris Jury.
| 4 | "Bad Vibrations" | 16 March 1988 |
Students in the department of electro-acoustics are coming down with strange maladies. Featuring David Bamber and SLAB!.
| 5 | "Values of the Family" | 23 March 1988 |
Professor Bunn is opposing the Vice-Chancellor's policies. Bob Buzzard makes friends with a famous athlete.
| 6 | "The Big Squeeze" | 30 March 1988 |
Students are suffering from malnutrition owing to high rents. Professor Bunn is accused of exposing himself to two students. Featuring Robert Lang, Mark Addy and Perry Benson.
| 7 | "Death of a University" | 6 April 1988 |
Rioting breaks out on campus, which brings an old friend back into Stephen's life.

=== A Very Polish Practice ===
Broadcast as part of the Screen One strand on 6 September 1992.
