= Madson (TV series) =

- Genre: Crime drama
- Written by: Ian Kennedy Martin; Colin Shindler
- Directed by: Rob Walker
- Starring: Ian McShane; Joanna Kanska; Matthew Marsh; Charles Gray; Thomas Craig; Shirley Anne Field; Andrew Burt; Jonathan Coy
- Composer: Denis King
- Country of origin: United Kingdom
- Original language: English
- No. of series: 1
- No. of episodes: 6

Production
- Executive producer: Chris Parr
- Producers: Ian McShane; Colin Shindler
- Cinematography: Peter Chapman
- Editor: Anthony Combes
- Running time: 50 minutes
- Production company: McShane Productions

Original release
- Network: BBC1
- Release: 17 April – 22 May 1996

Madson is a British television crime drama series, first broadcast on 17 April 1996, that ran for a total of six episodes on BBC1. The series starred Ian McShane as the title character who, sentenced on forged evidence to life imprisonment, gains a law degree in prison and overturns his conviction. Suddenly freed again after eight years inside, he uses his contacts to secure a position as an outdoor clerk with a top firm of City Solicitors.

Produced by McShane's production company by McShane himself with Chris Parr, it co-starred Joanna Kanska, Jayne Ashbourne, Matthew Marsh, and Charles Gray. Each episode shows inefficiencies of the law, solves a crime, or helps those whom the law neglected. Filming took place in West London between 23 August and 29 November 1995. The series has not been released on DVD.

== Cast ==
- Ian McShane as John Madson
- Joanna Kanska as Magda Ostrowska
- Jayne Ashbourne as Sarah Madson
- Matthew Marsh as DI Rourke
- Charles Gray as Sir Ranald Hearnley
- David Arlen as Donald
- Thomas Craig as Gordon Berry
- Kate Beckett as Cheryl Berry
- Barney Craig as Dominic
- Shirley Anne Field as Elaine Dews
- Darren Brown as DC Lear
- Andrew Burt as Chief Supt. Walton
- Jonathan Coy as George Lodge
- Julius Grower as Dan Berry

== Episodes ==
No.	Title	Directed by	Written by	British air date
1	"Part One"	Rob Walker	Ian Kennedy Martin	17 April 1996
When John Madson is released from prison, after serving eight years for a murder he did not commit, he is determined to discover the truth behind his arrest and false imprisonment.
2	"Part Two"	Rob Walker	Ian Kennedy Martin	24 April 1996
Sir Ranald Hearnley hires Madson to investigate a case of blackmail.
3	"Part Three"	Rob Walker	Ian Kennedy Martin	1 May 1996
Madson helps a woman who is being threatened by her estranged husband.
4	"Part Four"	Rob Walker	Colin Shindler	8 May 1996
Madson is asked to help Gordon's sister-in-law, who is being evicted from her bedsit.
5	"Part Five"	Rob Walker	Colin Shindler	15 May 1996
Madson returns to prison to help a teenage boy who has been wrongfully convicted of theft.
6	"Part Six"	Rob Walker	Ian Kennedy Martin	22 May 1996
Madson helps an international footballer accused of the attempted murder of his former wife.
