= Leale House =

Coordinates: 37°47′35″N 122°26′09″W

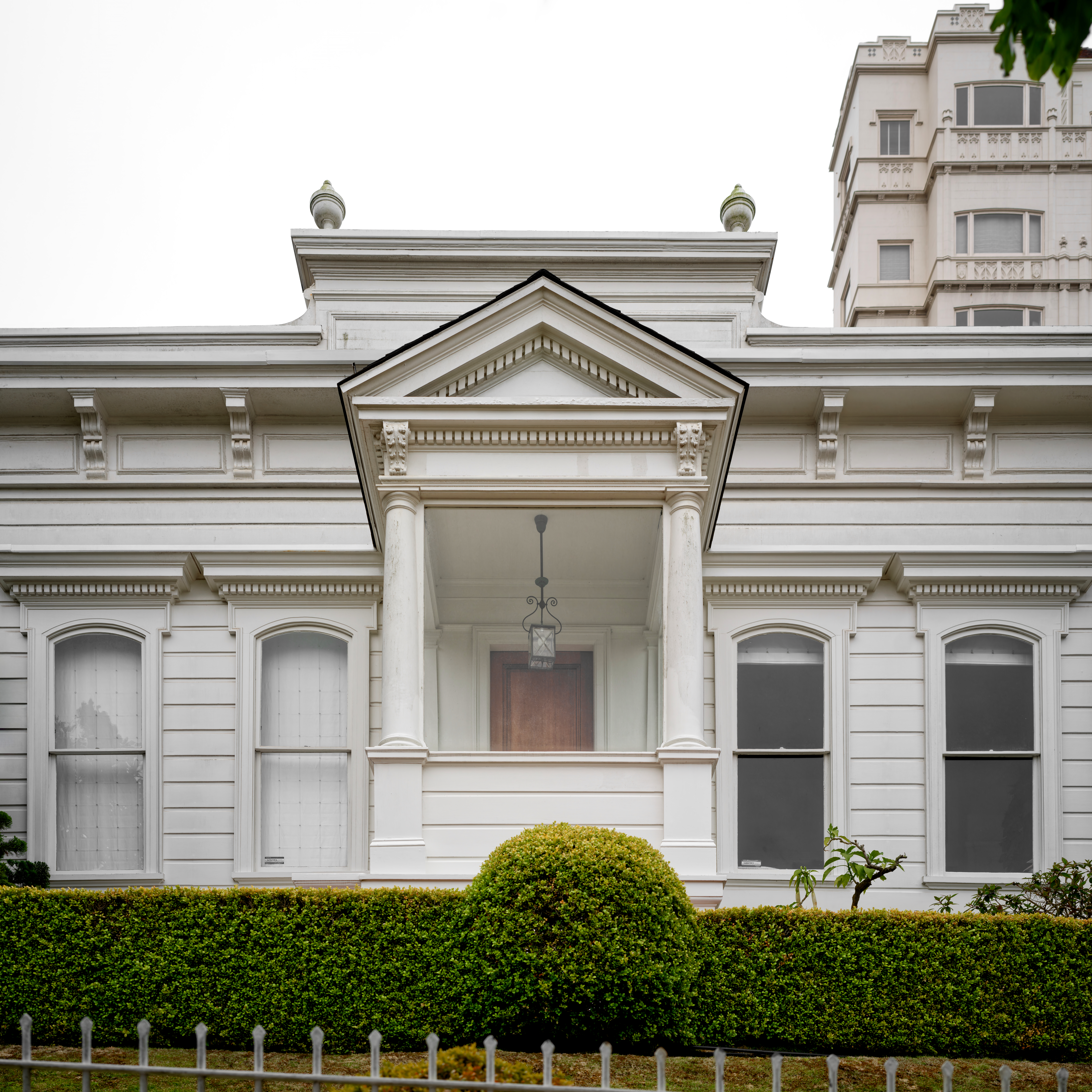
Leale House with "Susie's Building" in the background

The Leale House is a historic residence located at 2475 Pacific Avenue, between Fillmore Street and Steiner Street, in the Cow Hollow neighborhood of Pacific Heights, San Francisco, California in the United States.

As one of the oldest dwellings in the area, the exact origin of the Captain Leale House has been a subject of debate among scholars. Originally serving as the main house for a dairy farm, it is believed to have been constructed as early as 1853.

== History ==
The building was originally used as a farm house for a 25 acres (10 ha) dairy ranch. Captain Leale, a ferry boat captain, purchased the house in 1883. It is unclear whether he or the previous owner was responsible, but at some point, the facade was remodeled with a false front in the popular Italianate architectural style. Adjacent to the house, Captain Leale constructed a small study in the backyard, which was furnished and designed to resemble a pilot house, reflecting his nautical background.

== See also ==
- List of San Francisco Designated Landmarks
