= Joanna Kanska =

Polish-British actress (born 1957)

- Born: Joanna Osmakiewicz; 1 April 1957 (age 69); Nowy Sącz, Poland
- Known for: A Very Peculiar Practice

Joanna Kanska (born 1 April 1957) is a Polish-British actress who has worked in film, television, theatre and radio. She emigrated to the United Kingdom in 1984.

== Career ==
Born in Nowy Sącz, she attended the National Film School in Łódź from 1976 to 1980.

Kanska's best known roles on television were as a Polish academic, Grete Gretowska, in the second series of the BBC's A Very Peculiar Practice (1988) (and a sequel, A Very Polish Practice in 1992), as Ludmilla in The New Statesman, as Finnish bank trading floor dealer Sirkka Nieminen in Capital City (1990) and as KGB Major Nina Grishina in the BBC's mini-series Sleepers (1991). Kanska starred as lawyer Magda Ostrowska in the BBC series Madson (1995–1996). She also played the part of Greta Beaumont, a Sudeten German woman, in the first episode of Foyle's War.

== Personal life ==
Shortly after her arrival in the UK, Kanska married Polish artist Kaz Kanski after a romance of a few weeks. They divorced five years later, but she retained her married name (the feminine version of Kanski).
