= Hillwood Volcano =

Volcano in Tamar River, Tasmania

- Location within Tasmania

Highest point
- Elevation: 115 m (377 ft)
- Coordinates: 41.21°S 146.95°E

Geography
- Location: Hillwood, Tasmania, Australia
- Parent range: Tamar River

Hillwood Volcano is an extinct volcano located near Hillwood in Northern Tasmania Australia, with an elevation of 115 metres (377 ft) above sea level.

Located on private property, the site was accessible to local rock climbing groups. It is known as the Checkerboard by local climbers. The property owner erected signage prior to 2022 prohibiting access to the climbs. It is believed that some climbers were leaving unwanted rubbish and causing damage to the property with their vehicles.

== Geology ==
The Hillwood Volcano is a Tertiary Basaltic Outcrop to the Northwest of Murphys Hill. It features columnar basalts with small sparse vesicles containing zeolites.
