= Pacific Heights, San Francisco =

Pacific Heights
- Neighborhood
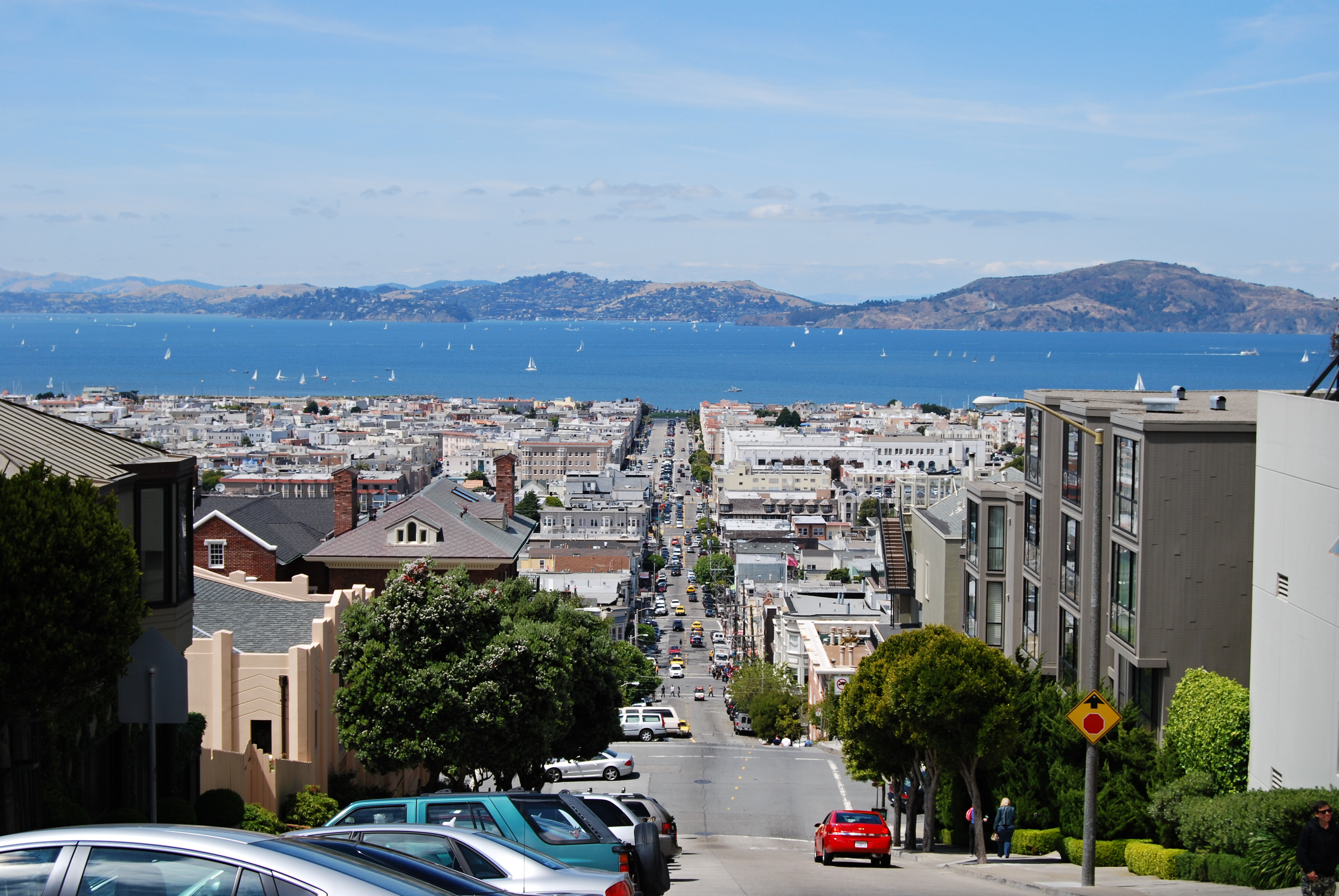
- San Francisco Bay as viewed from Fillmore Street, between Broadway and Vallejo.

- Location within Central San Francisco
- Coordinates: 37.7925°N 122.4346°W
- Country: United States
- State: California
- City-county: San Francisco

Government
  - Supervisor: Stephen Sherrill
  - State Assembly: Catherine Stefani (D)
  - State Senator: Scott Wiener (D)
  - U. S. Rep.: Nancy Pelosi (D)

Area
  - Total: 0.967 sq mi (2.50 km^{2})
  - Land: 0.967 sq mi (2.50 km^{2})

Population
  - Total: 21,925
  - Density: 22,677/sq mi (8,756/km^{2})
- Time zone: UTC−8 (Pacific)
  - Summer (DST): UTC−7 (PDT)
- ZIP codes: 94109, 94115, 94123
- Area codes: 415/628

Pacific Heights (often referred to as Pac Heights) is a wealthy neighborhood in San Francisco, California, United States. It has panoramic views of the Golden Gate Bridge, San Francisco Bay, the Palace of Fine Arts, Alcatraz, Presidio of San Francisco, and the Sutro Tower.

A 2013 article named Pacific Heights one of the most expensive neighborhoods in the United States. Since that year, Pacific Heights remains one of the ten most expensive neighborhoods in San Francisco.

== Geography and extent ==
"Pacific Heights" is the general term for the hilltop neighborhood found between Cow Hollow to the north, the Upper Fillmore or Lower Pacific Heights to the south, the Presidio and Presidio Heights to the west, and Polk Gulch to the east. However, definitions vary and there are several official designations by different city and neighborhood groups.

All definitions agree that the neighborhood extends westward from Van Ness Avenue to the vicinity of The Presidio. The San Francisco Association of Realtors (SFAR) and the San Francisco Mayor's Office of Neighborhood Services (MONS) generally designate the area between Green Street in the north, California Street in the south, and Lyon Street in the west as Pacific Heights. However, SFAR also includes the area south of The Presidio as extending a farther block west to Presidio Avenue, while MONS includes the stretch of Pine Street east of Fillmore as being in the neighborhood.

The Pacific Heights Residents Association defines the neighborhood more broadly, stretching from Union Street in the north to Bush Street in the south, with Lyon and Presidio Avenues being the western boundary. Additionally, the Cow Hollow Association includes the area north of Pacific Street and west of Pierce Street as belonging in their neighborhood, therefore including a considerable area usually considered Pacific Heights in Cow Hollow.

Pacific Heights is situated on a primarily east–west oriented ridge that rises sharply from the Marina District and Cow Hollow neighborhoods to the north to a maximum height of 370 feet (110 m) above sea level.

Lower Pacific Heights refers to the area located south of California Street down to Post or Geary Street. Historically, this area was previously considered part of the Western Addition. It was later called the Upper Fillmore, but the new neighborhood designation of Lower Pacific Heights became popularized by real estate agents in the early 1990s.

== History ==
The neighborhood was first developed in the 1870s, with small Victorian-inspired homes built. Starting around the beginning of the 20th century, and especially after the 1906 San Francisco earthquake, many were replaced with period homes. Still residential, the area is characterized by painted Victorian style architecture.

== Notable places ==
The oldest building in Pacific Heights, Leale House, located at 2475 Pacific Avenue, was built in 1853, though the majority of the neighborhood was built after the 1906 earthquake. The architecture of the neighborhood is varied; Victorian, Mission Revival, Edwardian, and Château styles are common.

There are numerous historic mansions in Pac Heights, including the Spreckels Mansion, the home of sugar tycoon Adolph B. Spreckels; the Whittier Mansion which served as the German Reich's West Coast headquarters during WWII, and many more.

Several countries have consulates in Pacific Heights. They include Italy, Greece, Vietnam, South Korea, China, and Germany.

Most of the neighborhood's boutiques and restaurants can be found along Fillmore Street, south of Pacific Avenue. Other businesses in Pacific Heights are located on California and Divisadero Streets, as well as on Van Ness Avenue.

Pacific Heights is home to several schools, including the San Francisco University High School; Drew School (formerly Drew College Preparatory School); the Hamlin School; Convent of the Sacred Heart High School; Stuart Hall High School, San Francisco Waldorf School, Academy of Thought and Industry, and Town School for Boys, among others. The celebrated Grant Elementary School was open on Pacific Ave from 1922 to 1972. Its students included children of diplomats, the well to do, and the adjacent Presidio military base. Current elementary schools include Hillwood Academic Day School, which opened in 1949.

== Parks ==
Pac Heights is home to numerous parks, including Lafayette Park, Alta Plaza Park, the Bush/Broderick Mini Park, the Cottage Row Mini Park, and the Hamilton Recreation Center.

== Events ==
Pac Heights has played host to many notable events -- both ongoing and one time -- such as:

- The annual Fillmore Jazz Festival
- A one time ski jump event, featuring an artificial snow jump at the corner of Broadway and Fillmore, which was hosted by Johnny Mosley, San Francisco’s Norwegian Consulate, and others.

== Government and infrastructure ==
The San Francisco Police Department Northern Station serves Pacific Heights. The neighborhood is in San Francisco's District 2, and is represented by former Stephen Sherrill, a former policy advisor to Mayor Bloomberg. Sherrill was appointed by outgoing mayor London Breed after Catherine Stefani, who served from January 30, 2018 – December 2, 2024, was elected to the California State Assembly, representing the 19th district.

== Notable people ==
- Larry Ellison, co-founder and chairman of Oracle Corporation
- Gordon Getty, billionaire businessman and composer
- Ann Getty, philanthropist, publisher, anthropologist, socialite
- Dagmar Dolby, widow of Dolby Laboratories founder Ray Dolby
- Jonathan Ive, former chief designer at Apple Inc.
- Jay Paul, billionaire real estate developer
- Nancy Pelosi, former Speaker of the United States House of Representatives, and her husband Paul Pelosi
- Noah Pritzker, member of the Pritzker family
- David O. Sacks, venture capitalist
- Danielle Steel, author
- Peter Thiel, co-founder of PayPal

== Gallery ==
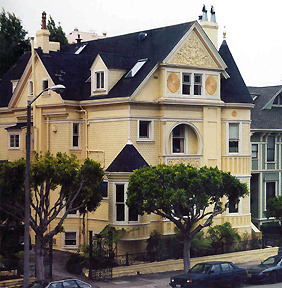
The C. A. Belden House on Gough Street is a late Revival Style home with Queen Anne and Beaux Arts features. The house is on the National Register of Historic Places in San Francisco.

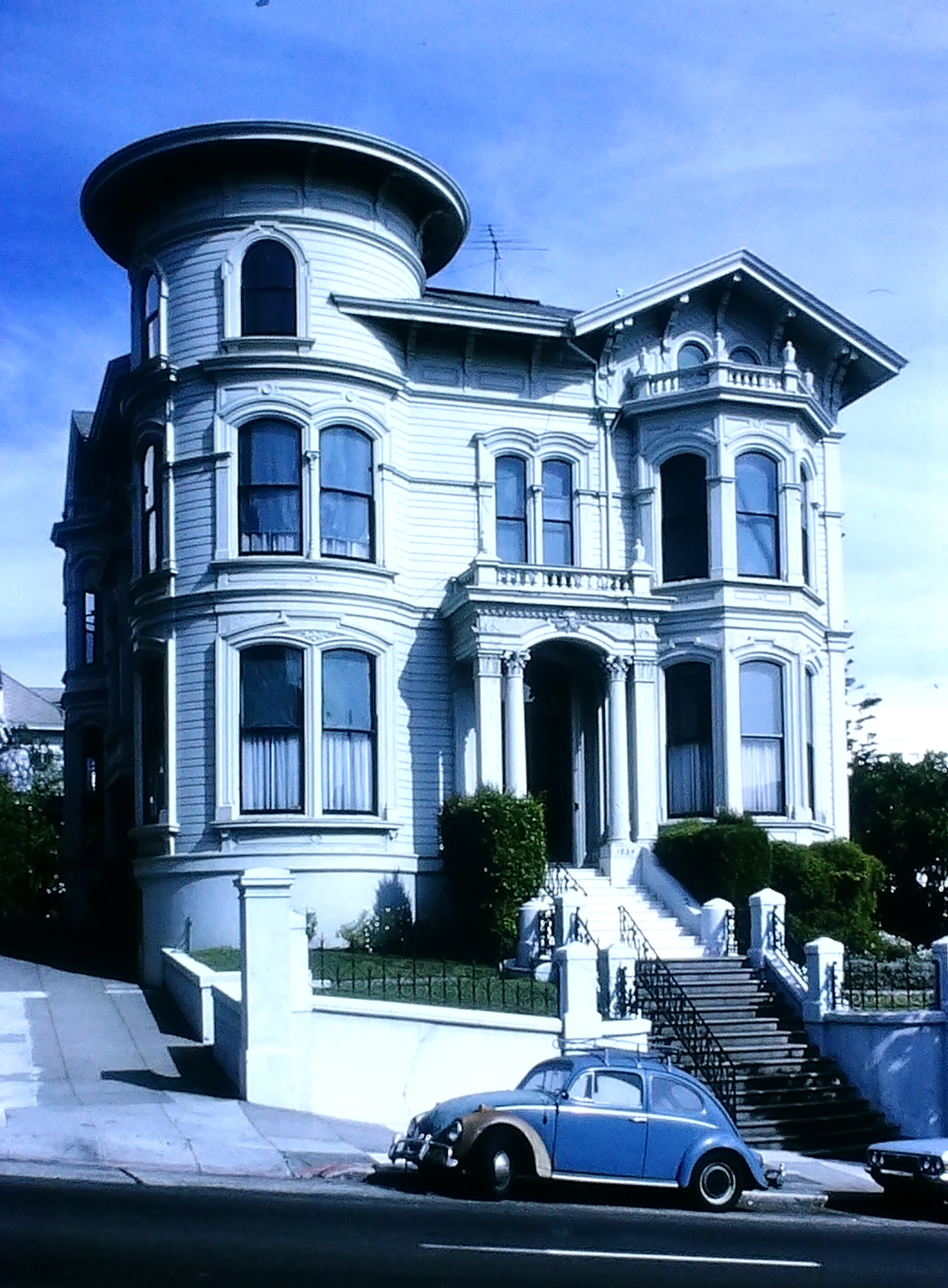
Wormser-Coleman House, California St., October 1979

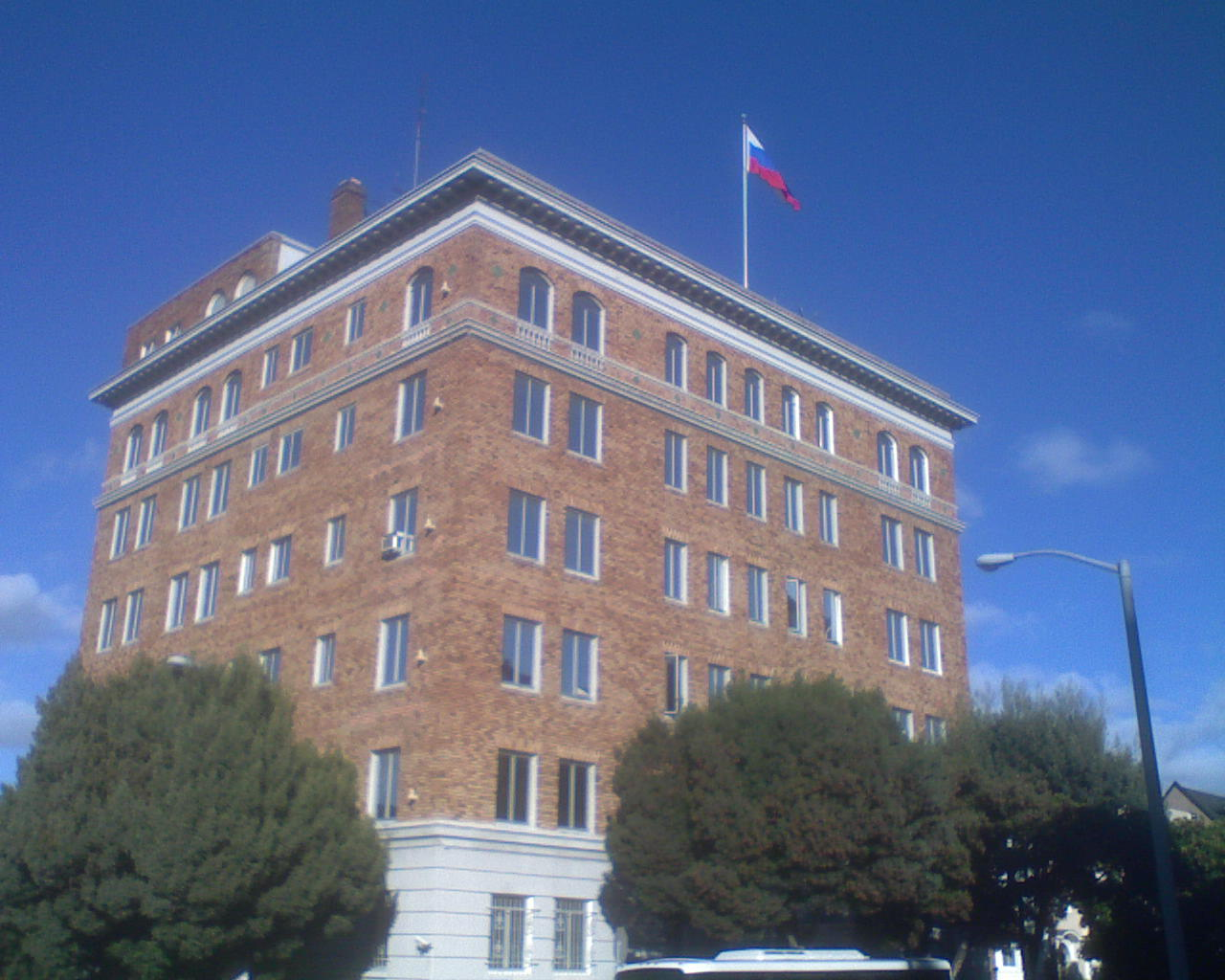
Consulate-General of Russia in San Francisco

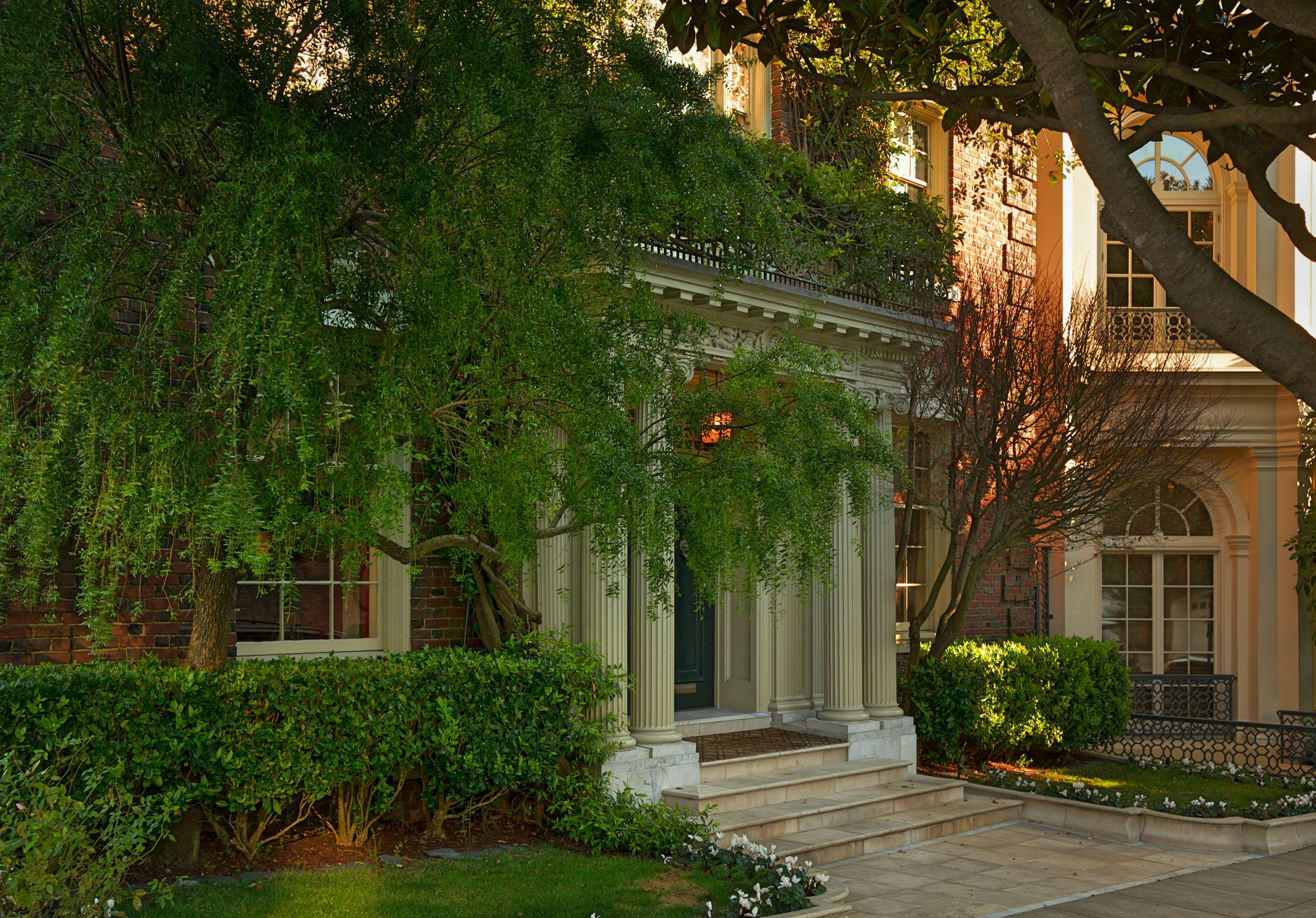
Typical house entrance in Pacific Heights

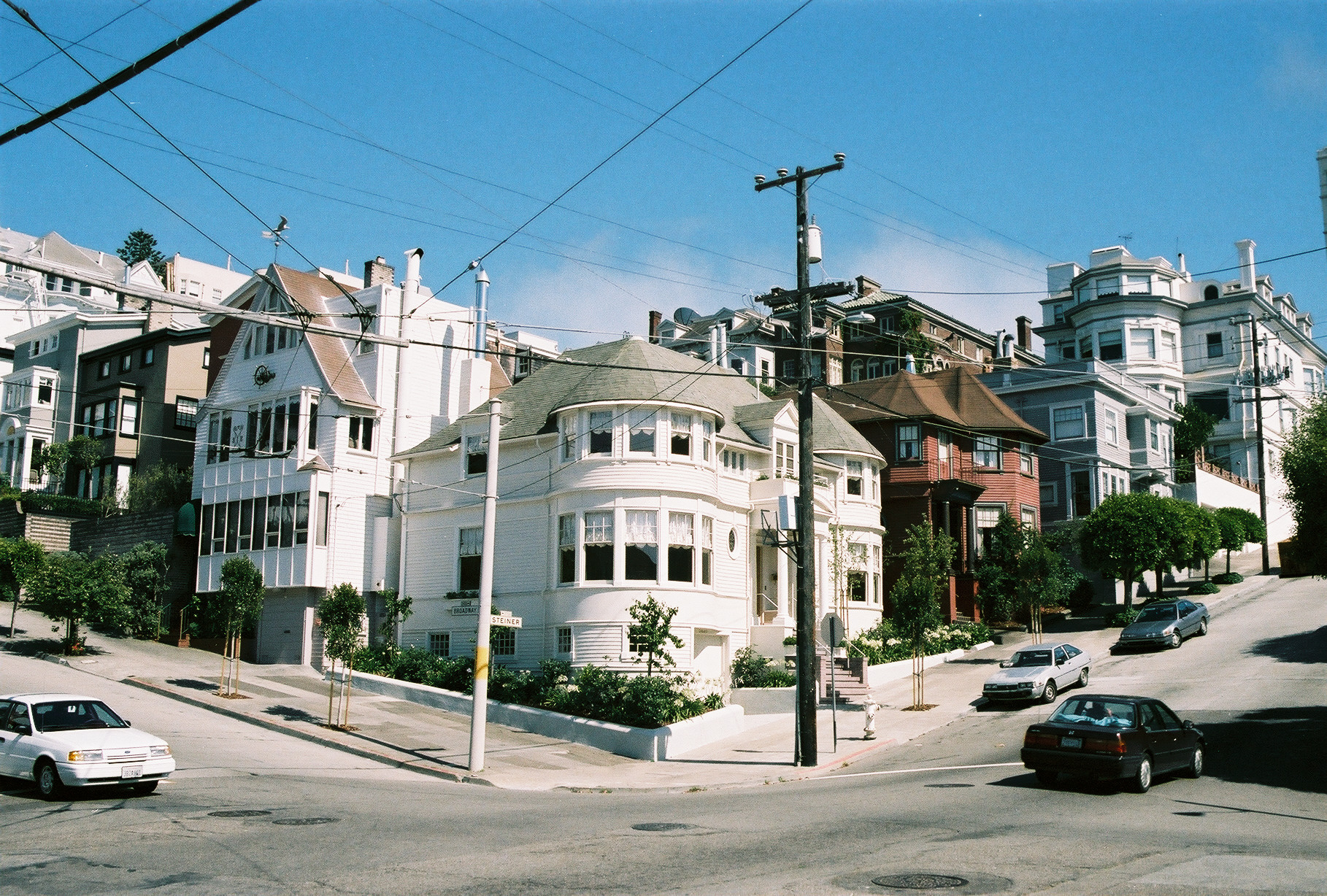
The house used for exterior shots of Mrs. Doubtfire, in 1993

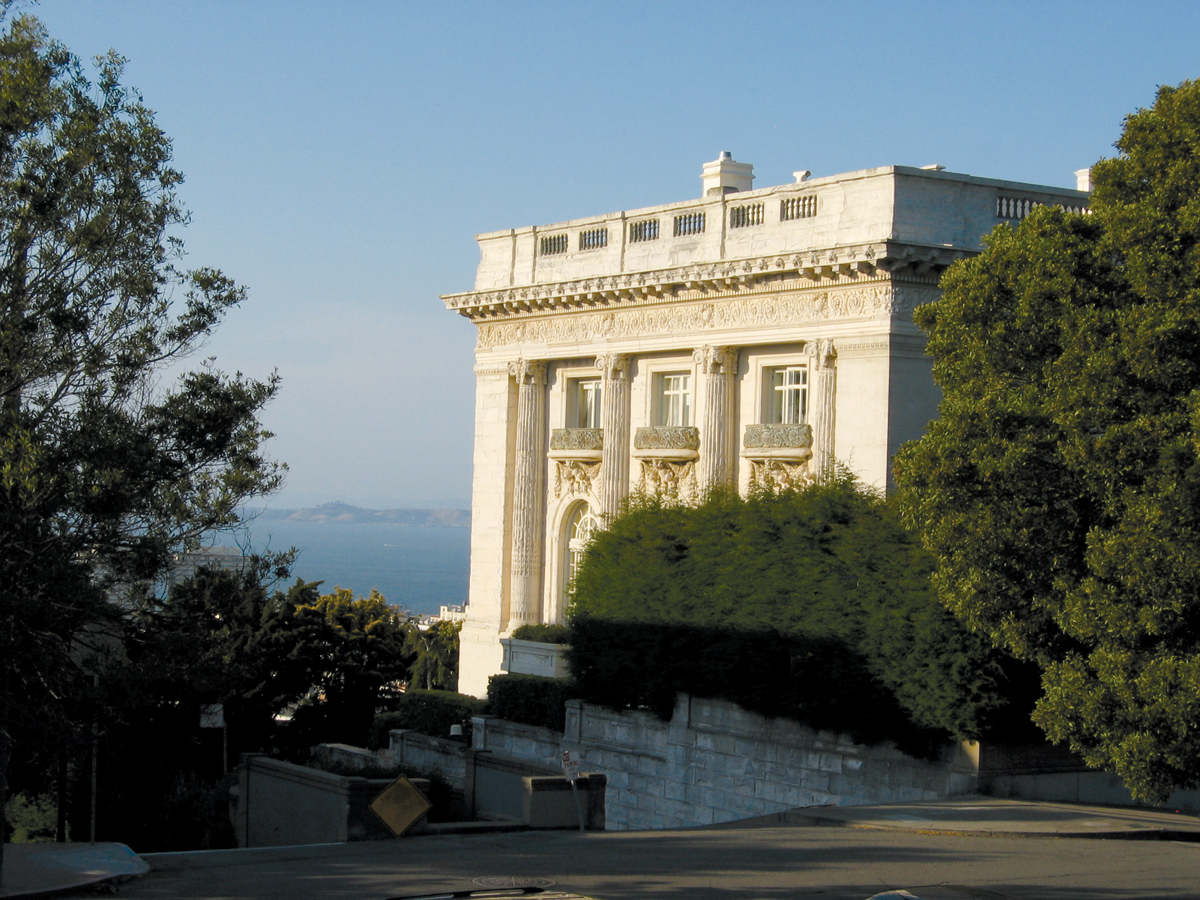
Spreckels Mansion

== See also ==
- List of hills in San Francisco
