= Amanda Hillwood =

English actress

- Born: Amanda Mary Smith; 26 February 1957 (age 69)
- Occupation: Actress
- Years active: 1982–1996
- Spouse: Matt Frewer (m. 1984)
- Children: 1

Amanda Hillwood (born Amanda Mary Smith; 26 February 1957) is an English actress.

== Biography ==
Hillwood is the daughter of Mark and Angela Smith (née Angela Hill-Wood, granddaughter of Sir Samuel Hill-Wood, 1st Baronet). Through her mother, she is a descendant of James Hamilton, 5th Duke of Hamilton and thus, because of the special remainder of that title, is distantly in line for the Dukedom of Hamilton.

Hillwood is best known for her roles as Lyn Turtle in the BBC TV series A Very Peculiar Practice and as Dr Grayling Russell in the ITV detective series Inspector Morse. She also appeared in the HTV drama Robin of Sherwood in May 1986, portraying the Sheriff of Nottingham's sister-in-law, Lady Isobel.

She is married to Canadian-American actor Matt Frewer (best known for his title role in Max Headroom). They have one daughter.

Hillwood and Frewer divide their time between Malibu, California, and the Gatineau Hills of Quebec.

== Film & TV ==
Year	Title	Role	Notes
1986–1988	A Very Peculiar Practice	Lyn Turtle	9 episodes
1986	Robin of Sherwood	Lady Isobel de Rainault	1 episode
1987	The Happy Valley	Lady Diana Delves Broughton	
1989	Inspector Morse	Dr Grayling Russell	4 episodes
1990	Die Hard 2	Stewardess #1 (Windsor Plane)	
1996	Lawnmower Man 2: Beyond Cyberspace	News Anchor	
