= Lafayette Park (San Francisco) =

Park in San Francisco, California

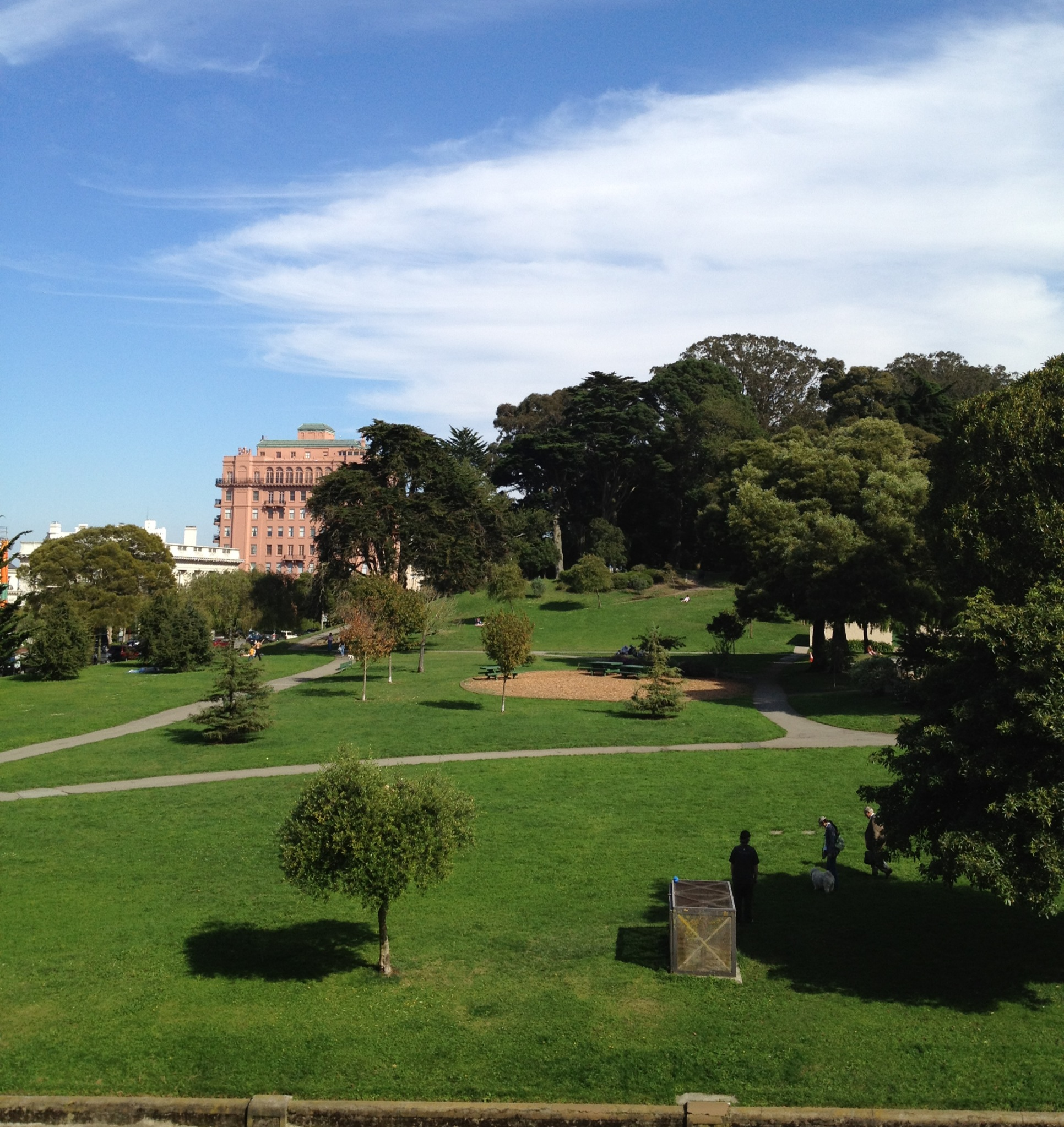
- Lafayette Park from the park's western edge

- Location within San Francisco County Location within California Location within the United States
- Type: Municipal
- Location: San Francisco, California
- Coordinates: 37°47′29″N 122°25′41″W
- Area: 12.5 acres (5.1 ha)
- Created: 1936
- Owner: San Francisco Recreation & Parks Department
- Operator: San Francisco Recreation & Parks Department

Lafayette Park is an 12.5 acres (5.1 ha) park in San Francisco, California, United States.

== Location ==
Originally created in 1936, it is located in the neighborhood of Pacific Heights between the streets of Washington, Sacramento, Gough, and Laguna.

== Amenities ==
Located on a hill, the park offers views of many areas, including the city's Marina district, Alcatraz Island and the San Francisco Bay, Buena Vista Park, and Twin Peaks. In addition to both open and treed green spaces, the park includes two tennis courts, a children's playground, an off-leash dog area, restroom facilities, and a picnic area.

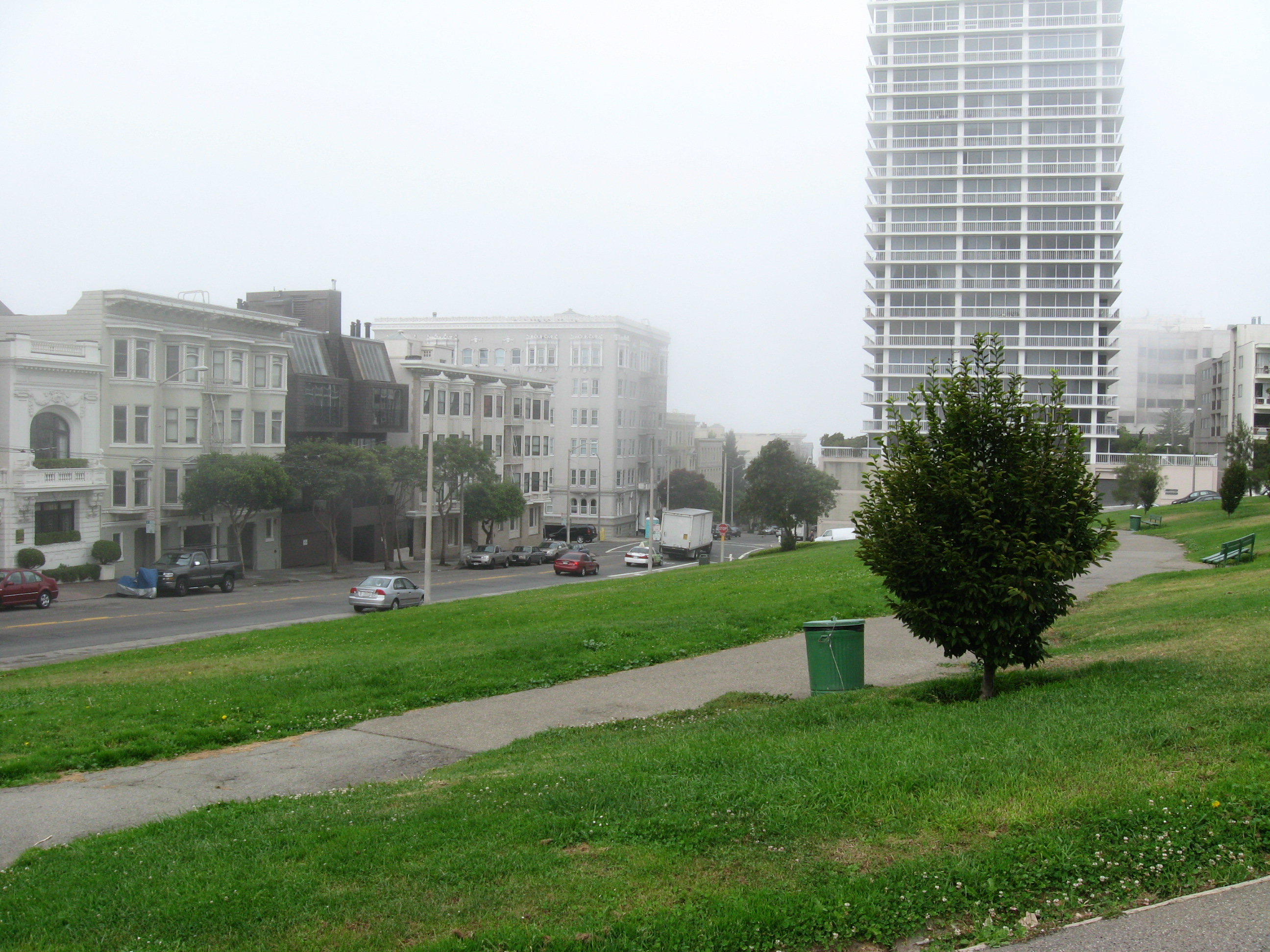

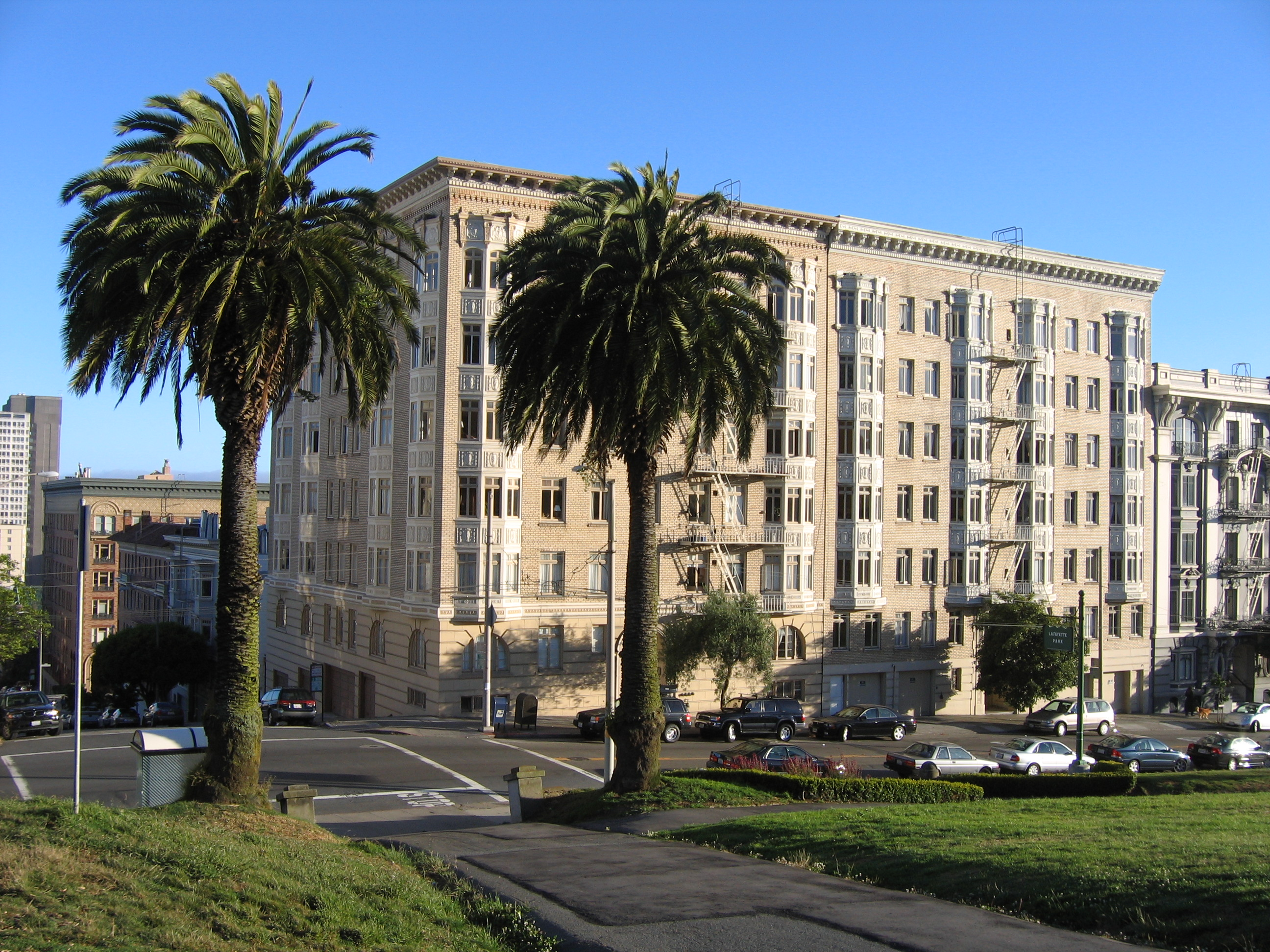

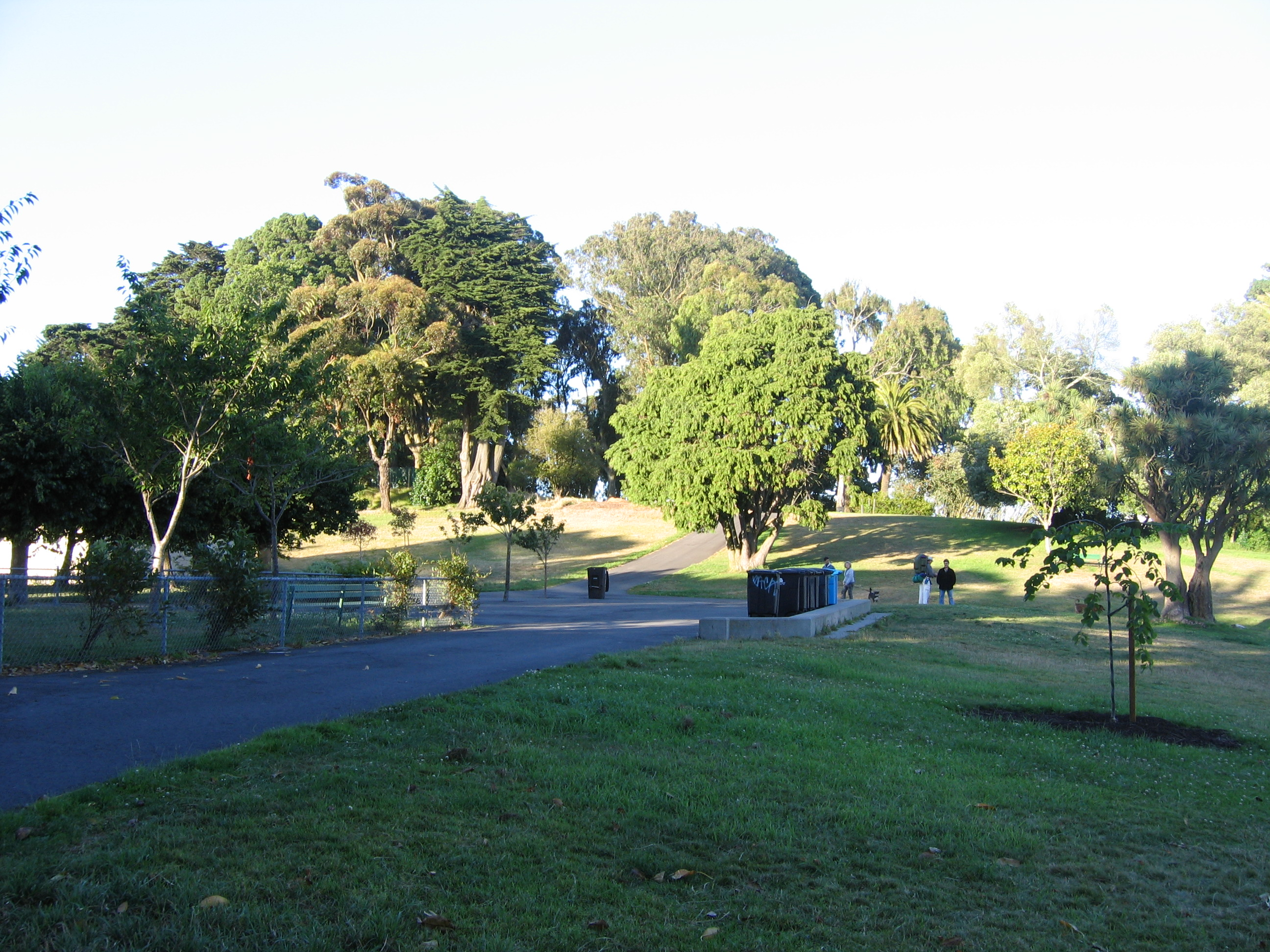

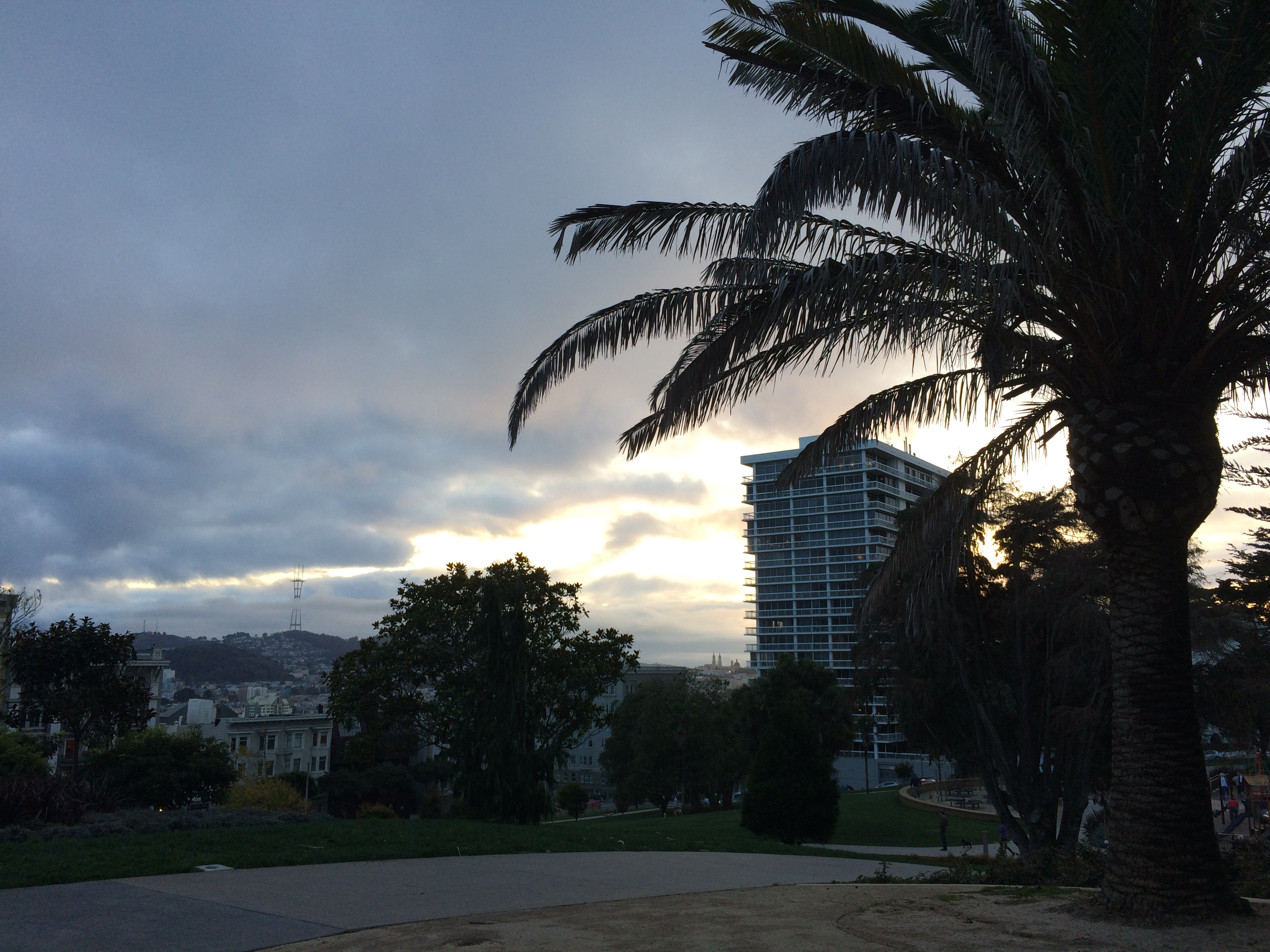
