= Hillwood Academic Day School =

Coordinates: 37°47′36.1″N 122°26′24.4″W

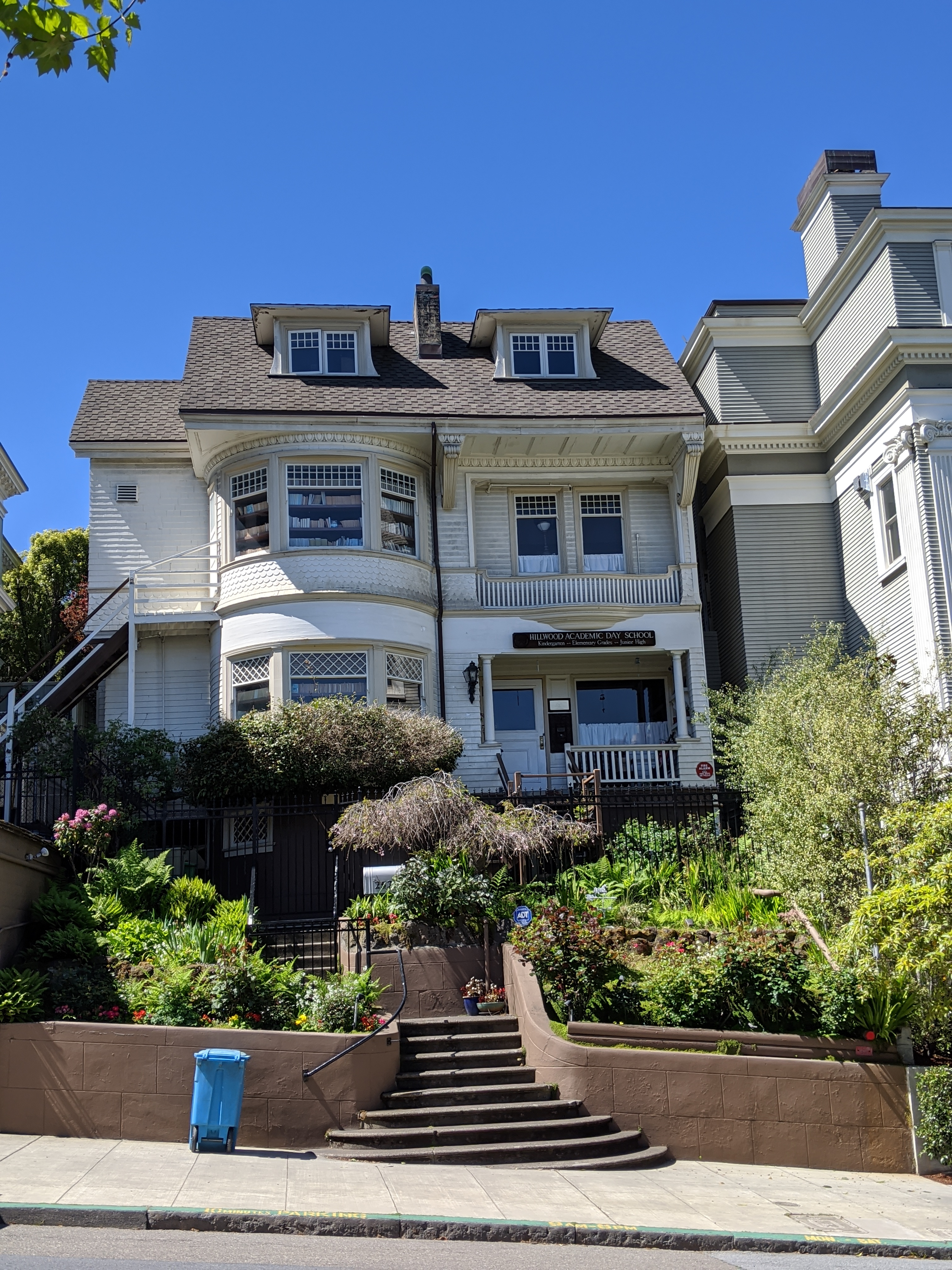

Location
- 2521 Scott Street; San Francisco, California 94115; United States

Information
- Established: 1949
- Founder: Mary Libra
- Director: Eric Grantz
- Teaching staff: 5.4 (FTE) (as of 2017/2018)
- Grades: K-8
- Enrollment: 21 (as of 2017/2018)
- Student to teacher ratio: 3.9 (as of 2017/2018)
- Hours in school day: 6
- Publication: The Hillwood Herald
- Website: www.hillwoodschool.com

Hillwood Academic Day is a small, independent school for boys and girls in the kindergarten through the eighth grade. The non-denominational school is located at 2521 Scott Street in San Francisco's Pacific Heights neighborhood. It was started in 1949 by Mary Libra and includes a summertime outdoor education program with a lodge in Muir Woods. Eric Grantz, the grandson of Libra and a Hillwood graduate, now runs the school, which has approximately 48 students. Hillwood's mascot is a black Labrador Retriever named Max, and the school's colors are forest green and blue. The student publication is The Hillwood Herald, a blog published by the fifth through eighth graders.

== History ==
Hillwood Academic Day School is included in the historical picture book San Francisco's Pacific Heights and Presidio Heights by Tricia O'Brien.

== Campus ==
Hillwood Academic Day School is located inside of a three-story Victorian home in the Pacific Heights neighborhood of San Francisco.

== Extracurricular activities ==
Throughout the school year, students participate in a variety of activities after the school day. While the school does not offer organized sports teams, students regularly play basketball and dodgeball.
