= Sea Cliff, San Francisco =

Neighborhood in California, United States

Sea Cliff
- Neighborhood of San Francisco
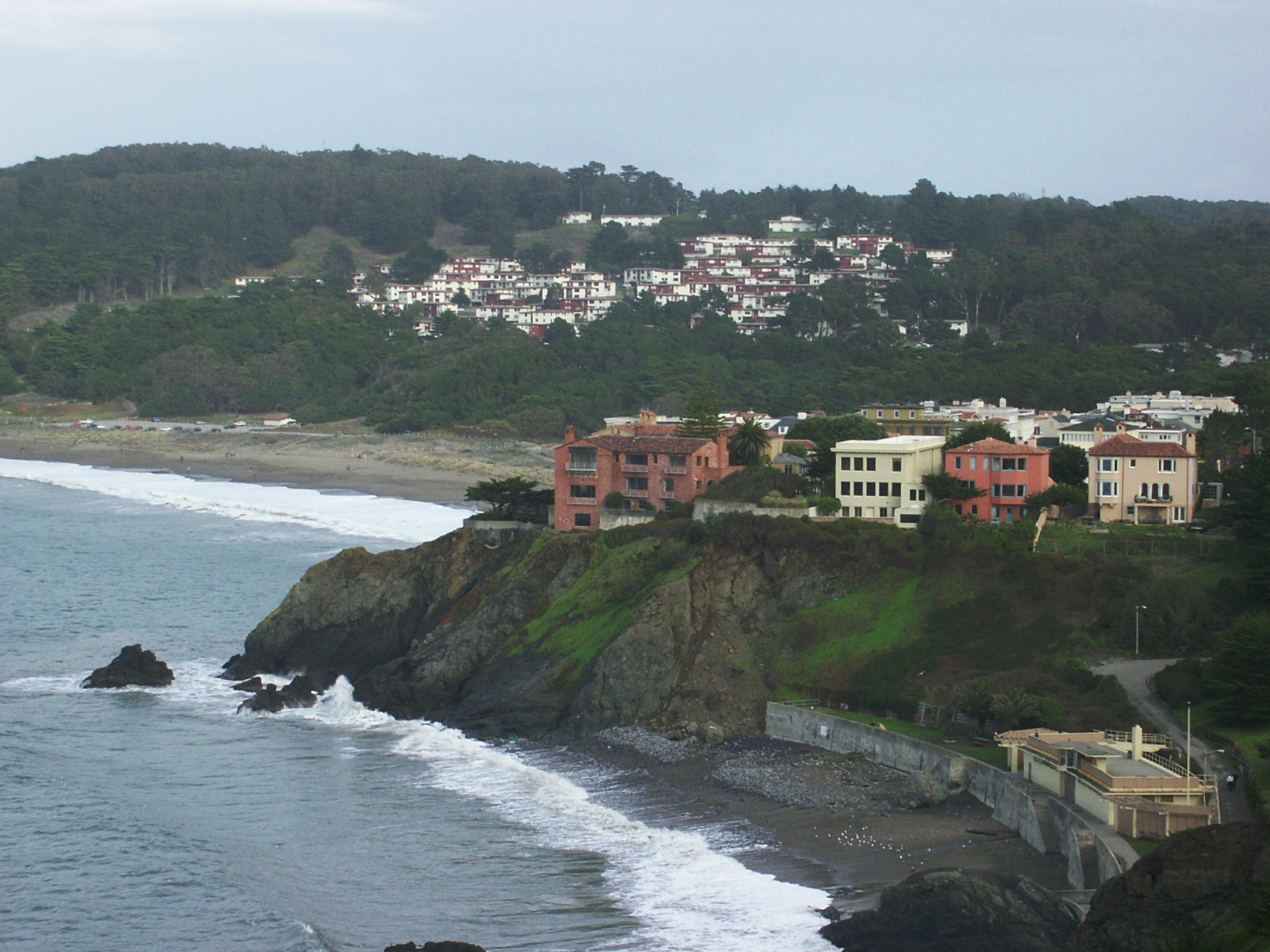
- China Beach is seen in the foreground with the sea wall. Baker Beach can be seen in the distance

- Location within San Francisco
- Coordinates: 37°47′15.08″N 122°29′22.86″W

Government
  - Supervisor: Connie Chan
  - Assemblymember: Catherine Stefani (D)
  - State Senator: Scott Wiener (D)
  - U. S. Rep.: Nancy Pelosi (D)

Area
  - Total: 0.37 km^{2} (0.143 sq mi)
  - Land: 0.37 km^{2} (0.143 sq mi)

Population
  - Total: 928
  - Density: 2,510/km^{2} (6,490/sq mi)
- ZIP Code: 94121, 94129
- Area codes: 415/628
- GNIS feature ID: 1655550

Sea Cliff (sometimes spelled Seacliff) is an affluent neighborhood located on the West Side of San Francisco. Known for its large houses and ocean views, Sea Cliff is one of nine master–planned residence parks in San Francisco; its master plan was developed by landscape architect Mark Daniels. Sea Cliff has become one of San Francisco's most elite residential areas.

== Location and history ==
Sea Cliff is adjacent to the Golden Gate Strait and Baker Beach, southwest of the Presidio of San Francisco, and east of Lincoln Park. Prior to the founding of San Francisco, the Spanish called the area now known as Sea Cliff, Coyote Gulch, which is also the name of the creek that flows from Mountain Lake in the Presidio to Baker Beach.

== Characteristics ==
Houses in the Sea Cliff neighborhood are large and many offer views of the Pacific Ocean, the Golden Gate Bridge, and the Marin Headlands. A small public beach named China Beach is located in the neighborhood, as well as the head of a trail to Lands End, a park within the Golden Gate National Recreation Area.

There are several buildings in Sea Cliff by notable architects:

- 9, 25 and 45 Scenic Way, built in 1914; architect, Willis Polk (1867–1924)
- The Hanson House at 126 27th Avenue, built in 1907; architect, John Charles Flugger (1865–1930)
- 50 Scenic Way, built in 1921 for Maude Strowbridge; architect, Julia Morgan (1872–1957)
- 60 McLaren Avenue and 455 Sea Cliff Avenue; architect, Albert L. Farr (1871–1947)
- 8 Sea Cliff Avenue; architect, Edward G. Bowles (1871–1939).

== Residents ==
Sea Cliff contains the residences for the consuls general of Switzerland, South Korea, and The Netherlands.

Some of the neighborhood's more famous current and past residents include:

- Ansel Adams, photographer
- Larry Baer, San Francisco Giants CEO
- Marc Benioff, co-founder of Salesforce
- Luke Brugnara, real estate tycoon convicted of tax evasion and mail fraud
- Jack Dorsey, founder of Twitter and Square, Inc.
- Donald Fisher, Gap founder
- Kevin Gausman, former San Francisco Giants pitcher
- Eileen Gu, freestyle skier
- Kirk Hammett, Metallica guitarist
- Paul Kantner, Jefferson Airplane guitarist
- Eugene Levy, actor
- Cheech Marin, actor
- Halsey Minor, founder of CNET
- Clinton Reilly, real estate mogul
- Linda Ronstadt, singer
- Walter Shorenstein, real estate investor
- George Soros, hedge fund investor
- Tom Steyer, hedge fund manager and 2020 presidential candidate
- Sharon Stone, actress
- Robin Williams, comic actor

== See also ==
- 49–Mile Scenic Drive
