= Lobos Creek =

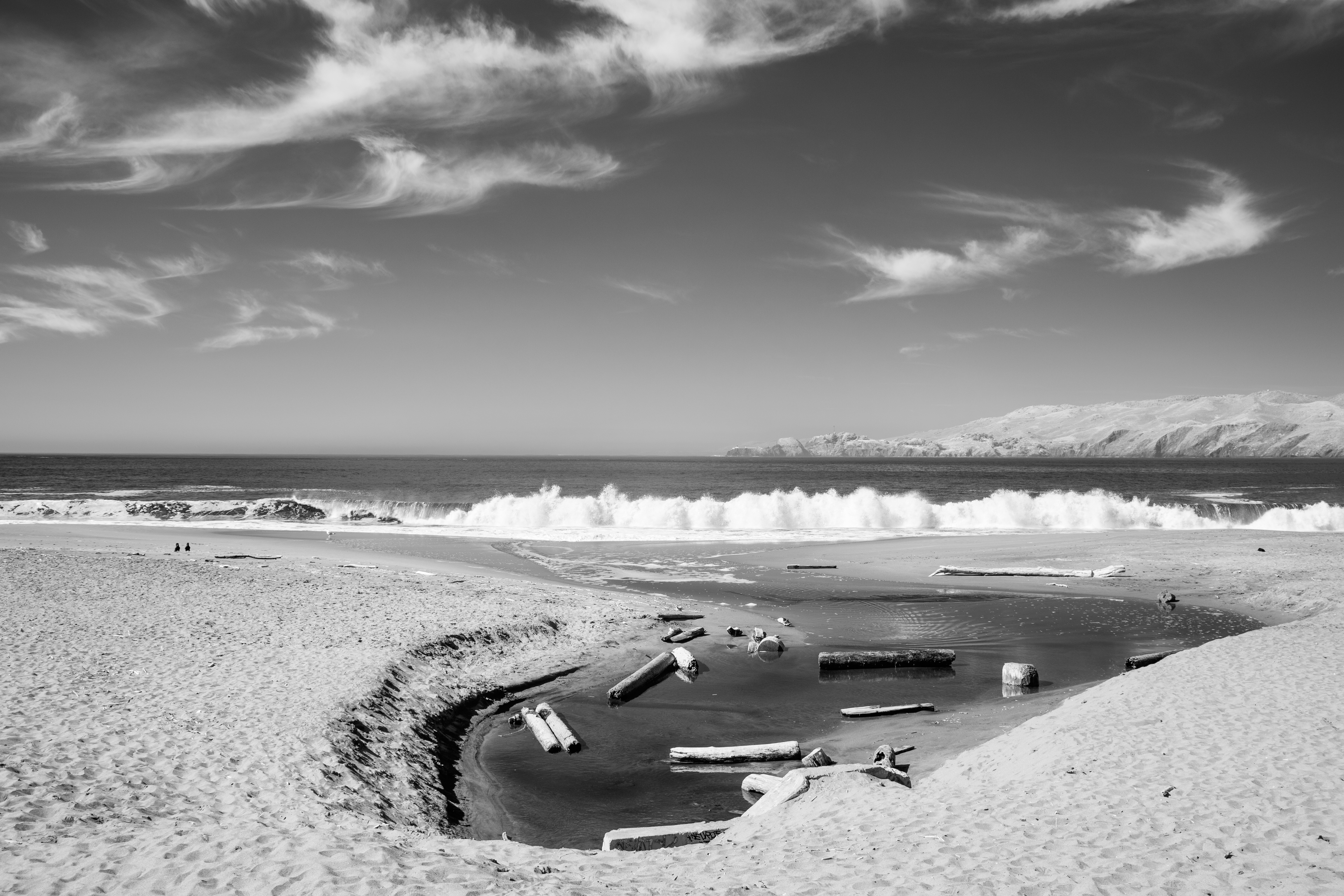

Location
- Country: United States
- State: California
- Region: San Francisco County
- City: San Francisco, California

Physical characteristics
- Source: The Presidio
  - location: The Presidio
- Mouth: Baker Beach, Pacific Ocean.
  - location: San Francisco, California
  - coordinates: 37.79093° N, 122.48534° W
  - elevation: 0 ft (0 m)

Lobos Creek (from the Spanish for sea lion, lobo marino — literally, "sea wolf") is a stream in the Presidio of San Francisco in San Francisco, California.

== Overview ==
Lobos Creek runs from runoff in the Presidio and Seacliff areas and underground seepage from springs that form Mountain Lake to the Pacific Ocean, marking the division between Baker Beach and China Beach. Conservation and restoration efforts are under way to remove invasive vegetation and improve water flow, in addition to deculverting.

Lobos Creek is the Presidio's primary source of potable water. About a million gallons per day—half the average flow of the creek—is diverted to a water treatment facility in the Presidio.

== See also ==
- List of watercourses in the San Francisco Bay Area
