= Ed Wheelan =

American comic strip artist

- Born: 1888 San Francisco, California, U.S.
- Died: 1966 (aged 77–78) Fort Myers, Florida, U.S.
- Area: Cartoonist
- Notable works: Minute Movies

Edgar Stow Wheelan (1888–1966), who signed his work Ed Wheelan, was an American cartoonist best known for his comic strip Minute Movies, satirizing silent films, and his comic book Fat and Slat, published by EC Comics. He was one of the earliest writer-artists to introduce daily narrative continuity and cinematic techniques to comic strips.

Born in San Francisco, Wheelan was the son of costume designer Albertine Randall, who drew the 1920s strip The Dumbunnies, and businessman Fairfax Henry Wheelan, a political reformer.

== Comic strips ==
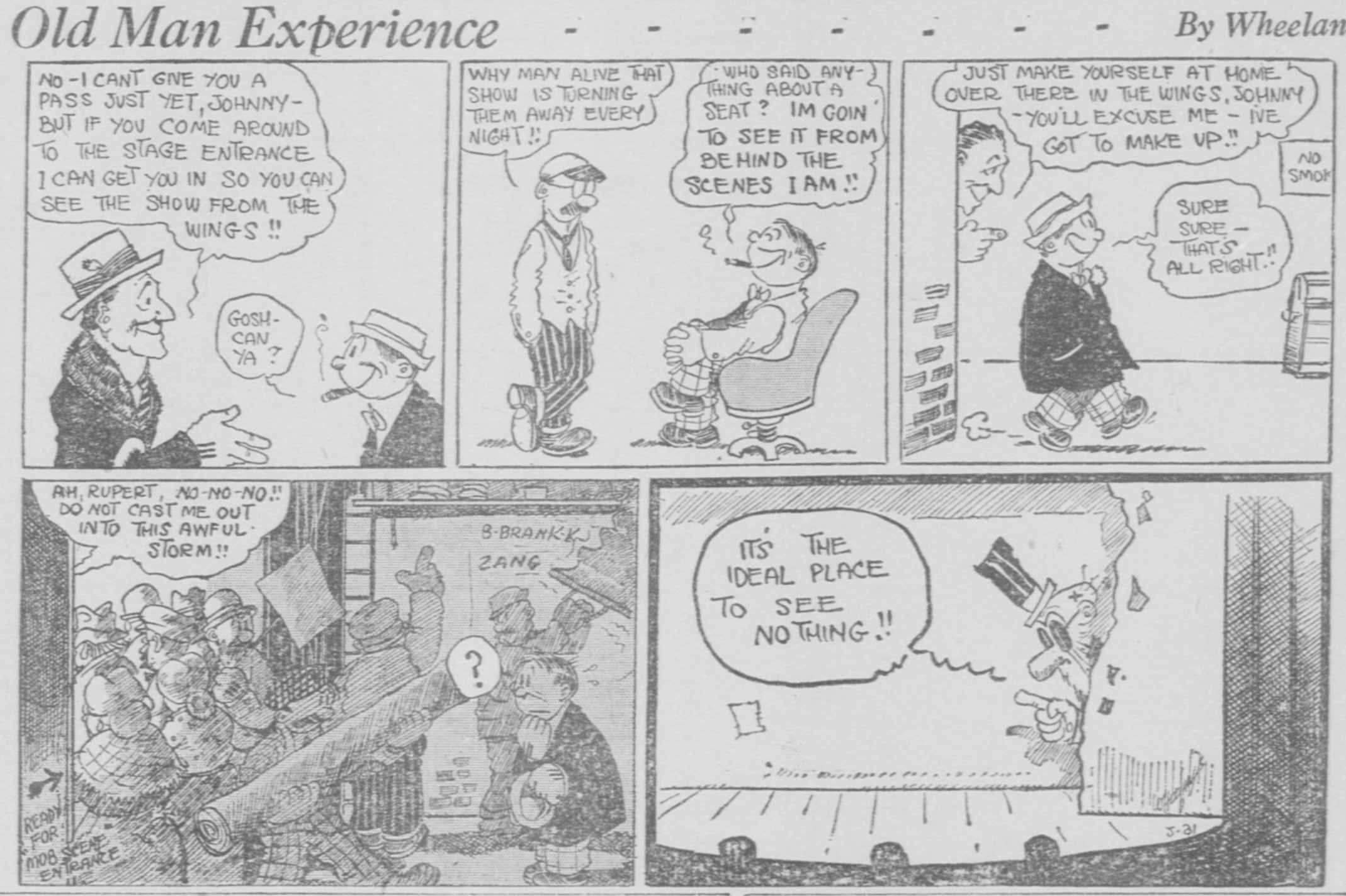
Installment of Wheelan's comic strip Old Man Experience.

Prepared at the Thacher School and Phillips Exeter Academy, then graduating from Cornell University in 1911, Wheelan found employment at the San Francisco Examiner, moving on to the New York American, where he drew an eight-column comic strip about sports.

For William Randolph Hearst's King Features, he created the strip Midget Movies in 1918, but he left in 1920 after a dispute with Hearst. To replace Midget Movies, Hearst launched The Thimble Theatre, drawn by Elzie Crisler Segar.

Wheelan continued to mock movies in his Minute Movies for the George Matthew Adams Service. He drew the two-tiered Minute Movies from the early 1920s until 1935, developing one of the characters into a spin-off strip, Roy McCoy. Near the end of the 1930s, Wheelan teamed with Bill Walsh on Big Top, a circus strip.

== Comic books ==
In the early 1940s, DC Comics brought back Minute Movies as a feature in 58 issues of Flash Comics. In 1944, Max Gaines published the Edgar Wheelan Joke Book with Wheelan's Fat and Slat characters, who returned in their own title, Fat and Slat, which ran for four quarterly issues in 1947 and 1948. The book also featured Wheelan's "Comics" McCormick ("The World's #1 Comic Book Fan").

In the late 1940s, Wheelan drew Foney Fairy Tales, fairy tale parodies that ran as a feature in Wonder Woman and Comic Cavalcade.

After leaving comics, Wheelan created paintings of clowns. He died in 1966 in Fort Myers, Florida.

== Reprints ==
In 1972, Woody Gelman reprinted Minute Movies in his Nostalgia Comics.

Other reprints include:

- Minute Movies 1977 Hyperion Press, ISBN 0-88355-671-5 (reprints from 1927 & 1928).
- Let's Go to the Movies aka Murder City 1990 Malibu Graphics ISBN 0-944735-74-6 (reprints April 30, 1934 to August 4, 1934).
