= William Hammond Hall =

American civil engineer (1846–1934)

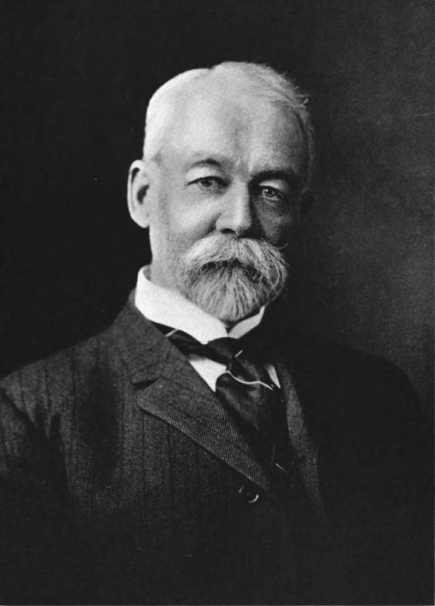
- Born: February 12, 1846; Hagerstown, Maryland
- Died: October 16, 1934 (aged 88); San Francisco, California
- Occupation: Civil engineer

William Hammond Hall (1846–1934) was a civil engineer who was the first State Engineer of California, and designed Golden Gate Park in San Francisco, California.

== Biography ==
William Hammond Hall was born in Hagerstown, Maryland, on February 12, 1846.

After serving with the U.S. army engineers in the Civil War, Hall was assigned in the latter part of the 1860s to surveying the Western regions of the United States and preparing topographical maps.

During this same time, the citizens of San Francisco were considering building a grand park for their new and growing city. The city designated a tract of 1,013 acres (4.10 km^{2}) stretching out to the ocean that was known as the "outside land." In 1870 the Park Commission solicited bids for a topographical survey which was awarded to Hall. After the successful completion of that task, he was appointed Golden Gate Park's first superintendent in 1871.

Hall devised a plan to improve the Park. The design included a Panhandle along with two main drives. Additionally, the outside land was covered with sand dunes which needed to be reclaimed and replaced by forest trees. 60,000 trees had been planted by 1875 (blue gum Eucalyptus, Monterey pine and Monterey cypress). Plantings continued and there were 155,000 trees planted by 1879.

In 1876, Hall was elected a member of the California Academy of Sciences, and was appointed California's first State Engineer. Despite his new responsibilities, he retained the position of consulting engineer to Golden Gate Park until he resigned in 1890, and was replaced by his assistant John McLaren.

As California's State Engineer, Hall worked on a comprehensive water supply and flood control system for the Sacramento Valley. Hall's study of California's hydrology lasted from 1878 through 1883. In that time, his staff installed an extensive flow gauging system along some of California rivers. He was also instrumental in designing projects to help San Francisco acquire adequate supplies of water from the western watershed of the Tuolumne River. Following the earthquake of 1906, San Francisco was able to secure the rights to the water, and it flooded Hetch Hetchy Valley.

== Personal life ==
Hall married Emma Kate Fitzhugh in 1870, and they had three daughters.

He died in San Francisco on October 16, 1934.

== List of projects ==
- Golden Gate Park (Urban park in San Francisco, California)
- Mountain Lake Park (Urban park in San Francisco, California)
- Gardens of 86 Sea View, Piedmont, California
