= House of Air =

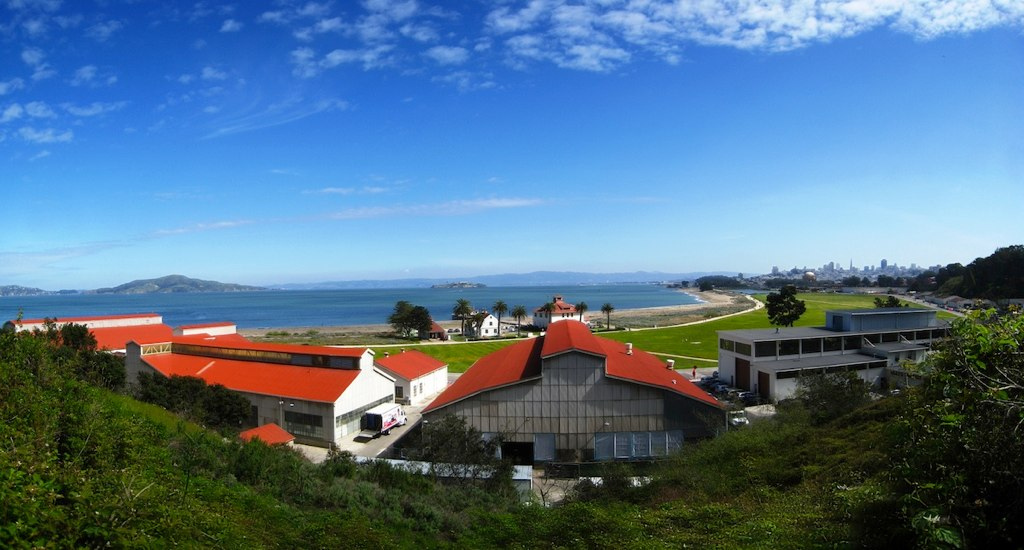
House of Air, a trampoline park in a converted airplane hangar in Crissy Field

House of Air is an indoor trampoline park located in San Francisco's Crissy Field. Opened in 2010, it is located in a converted Presidio air hangar. The facility features over 8,000 square feet (740 m^{2}) of trampoline space. Its creation is a result of the Presidio Trust, an agreement to restore and create recreational facilities in San Francisco's national park.

== Facility ==
Built in 1921 the building originally served as a Crissy Field airplane hangar, which helped launch De Havilland DH-48 biplanes as part of the United States Army 91st Observation Squadron. Later it was used as a motor vehicle paint shop and office and storage space for the Army and is a contributing feature to the park's National Historic Landmark status. The hangar was redesigned by San Francisco architect, Mark Horton, and features 42-foot (13 m) wide by 20-foot (6.1 m) tall bi-folding glass hangar door and a second story catwalk overlooking the trampoline structures. Historic photography of the building and the surrounding Presidio are showcased in a 35-foot (11 m) display wall at the entrance of the building.

== The Park ==
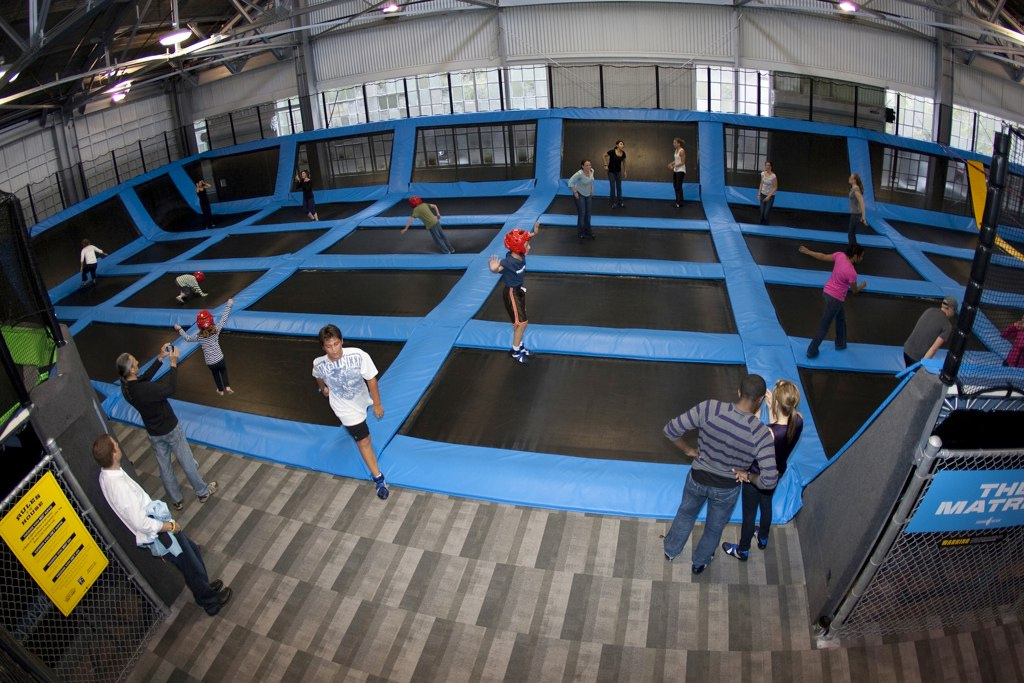
42 conjoined trampolines form "The Matrix", in San Francisco's House of Air

"The Matrix" measures 110 feet (34 m) by 45 feet (14 m) and contains 42 conjoined rectangular trampolines. The north end of "The Matrix" features a "2X Bowl", a freestyle trampoline obstacle modeled after skatepark designs, which includes two three-sided bowls separated by a low wall called a spine. "The Colosseum", measuring 45 feet (14 m) by 45 feet (14 m), consists of 22 conjoined trampolines and is used for organized trampoline dodgeball. "The Training Ground", composed of five string-bed trampolines, and booked by appointment or group class only, is a professional aerial training area. Finally, "The Fort" is an area made up of 15 connected trampolines for children aged three to six.

The park is frequented by professional athletes including Olympic Gold Medalist Jonny Moseley, Red Bull parkour team member Ryan Doyle and others. It has been featured several times in trend stories about trampoline fitness, including CBS's The Doctors. The park also holds organized dodgeball tournaments and a summer camp sessions. Programs offered to customers are open trampoline use on an hourly basis, fitness classes and aerial training classes.
