= Fairfax Henry Wheelan =

Wheelan in 1905

Fairfax Henry Wheelan (September 27, 1856 – March 26, 1915) was an American businessman, philanthropist, and political reformer. As the chief complaining witness of voter fraud in 1904, he played a primary role in the eventual downfall of San Francisco Mayor Eugene Schmitz and his attorney and political boss Abe Ruef.

== Early life and education ==
Wheelan was born in San Francisco, California, the son of Peter Wheelan and Catherine Frances Baker. Wheelan¹s father built and operated one of the first flour mills in California and was elected to the San Francisco Board of Supervisors and was member of California State Assembly 11th District, 1883-85. His grandfather, John Henry Baker, was the owner of Golden Gate Ranch, later to be known as Baker Beach in San Francisco.

He was educated McClure Military Academy in Oakland, Christian Brothers School and Catholic University School in Dublin.

Wheelan at Harvard College

He entered Harvard College in 1875 and graduated in the Class of 1880, which included friendships with future president Theodore Roosevelt and Secretary of State Robert Bacon, New York City reformer Richard Welling, Boston Mayor Josiah Quincy and William George Pellew. He served as business manager for the Harvard Crimson and the Hasty Pudding Theatricals at Harvard.

== Career ==
After college, he returned to San Francisco in 1881 and started a new operation for Wheelan's Mills in West Berkeley. During this time, he served as editor for the Berkeley Beacon and was elected School Director for the Town of Berkeley. In 1886, he opened a new flour mill in San Luis Obispo and eventually settled in Santa Barbara. He later sold his business to the Central Milling Company in San Jose.

In Santa Barbara, Mr. Wheelan became the first president of the Santa Barbara Club in 1892. In 1893, he developed 2 patents related to flour mill operations.

By 1888, he had left Central Milling to become general manager of Southern Mill and Warehouse Company. He eventually returned to San Francisco in 1894 as vice president of Southern Pacific Milling Company and director of the Salinas Valley Lumber Company.Serving on the board with his friend Timothy Hopkins.

In 1887, Wheelan married Albertine Randall, the daughter of Albert Gallatin Randall, an original San Francisco 49'er, and member of the San Francisco Committee of Vigilance of 1851 and Anne Soule, in San Francisco May 18, 1887, at Trinity Church.

While in Santa Barbara, Mr. Wheelan was the first president of the Santa Barbara Club in 1892. In 1893, he developed 2 patents related to flour mill operations.

He and his wife, Albertine, had two sons, Edgar Stow Wheelan, born in San Francisco on April 7, 1888, and Fairfax Randall Wheelan, born in Santa Barbara on August 1, 1891. Wheelan's wife, Albertine Randall Wheelan, began what would be a long career as a fine artist, the costume director for stage producer David Belasco, and book illustrator. She is considered to be one of first women cartoonists in America.

== Political reformer ==
As a director of the San Francisco Merchants’ Association, Wheelan helped led the organization's efforts to end voter fraud, and in 1904 personally challenged illegal ballot stuffing at San Francisco's Almshouse which had been orchestrated by the then Mayor Schmitz's brother and backed by Ruef. The incident eventually led to the indictment and conviction of several election fraud perpetrators.

In July 1905, Wheelan wrote to President Theodore Roosevelt about political corruption in San Francisco and the effort to defeat Mayor Eugene Schmitz, arguing that “the cause of good government throughout the Union demands that Mr. Schmitz should not be re-elected to office.”

This influence was noted by then Republican leader George Knight when he was quoted in the Oakland Tribune that, "It is funny that Pres. Roosevelt cannot find anyone in California to consult with except Fairfax Wheelan and Benjamin Ide Wheeler. Both are good men, but are they the only honest citizens of California?"

=== San Francisco Republican League and 1905 Fusion Party ===
As part of his reform activities, Wheelan helped form and led the San Francisco Republican League which was made up of the city’s more progressive wing of the Republican Party.

The Republican League consequently joined with the Democratic Party, under the leadership of lawyer Gavin McNab, the Southern Pacific Railroad's Republican organization, and other local leaders, including Fremont Older, editor of the San Francisco Bulletin, in 1905 to create a fusion movement which would challenge Union Labor Party’s Eugene Schmidt, to a two-party race rather have the incumbent mayor win in a "three-corner" fight.

Wheelan and McNab led the effort to identify a consensus candidate for the mayoral election which led to the selection of Harry Baer, the then auditor of the city of San Francisco, who was a Republican. They presented their recommendation to Older, a major power broker, for his approval. Older, fearing a railroad-led pushback, and accused both of unstated illegalities, and, according to historian Walton Bean, Older used "blunt political blackmail" to have Baer's nomination withdrawal and endorse his own choice, John Partridge, a young and inexperienced lawyer with strong support from the railroad leaders.

During the 1905 campaign, Wheelan directed that Chinese and Japanese workers not be employed to distribute Republican League campaign literature. The decision came amid intense anti-Asian labor politics in San Francisco. Mayor Eugene Schmitz publicly advocated the exclusion of Japanese laborers, while local labor organizations formed the Japanese and Korean Exclusion League in 1905 to campaign against Asian immigration and employment. After the election, Wheelan wrote to President Theodore Roosevelt that much of the difficulty faced by the unsuccessful reform campaign had resulted from tensions with organized labor.

The Partridge selection, as Ruef had predicted, led to the breakdown of the fusion coalition and caused a landslide victory for Schmidt's bid for reelection.

== San Francisco Earthquake ==
Following the 1906 San Francisco earthquake, Wheelan joined the city's emergency relief effort despite having opposed Mayor Eugene Schmitz politically before the disaster. As a member of the Committee of Fifty, Wheelan chaired the subcommittee on Roofing the Homeless, while Katharine "Kitty" Felton, director of Associated Charities of San Francisco, chaired relief efforts for the sick and wounded. Wheelan, Felton and Schmitz were also among the San Francisco relief leaders who signed an April 24, 1906 telegram to President Theodore Roosevelt concerning care for the city's homeless, sick and destitute.

As part of the emergency response, Wheelan also helped assess the disaster's death toll. On April 25, 1906, the Morning Oregonian reported that he estimated the loss of life at fewer than 300, substantially below estimates then being cited by the San Francisco coroner's office. Wheelan continued working with Felton after the disaster, later serving on the board of Associated Charities and chairing its Municipal and Legislative Committee. In 1907, Wheelan and Felton helped establish a program supported by the Native Sons and Native Daughters of the Golden West to place homeless and dependent children in private family homes.

== Civic life ==
Wheelan was also a creative force in San Francisco and a popular public speaker. He was a founding member of the University Club of San Francisco[6] and served as president from 1901 to 1903. He was the primary officer of the city's exclusive literary club, the Chit-Chat Club, for sixteen years, and was its leader at the time of the earthquake in 1906. He reported to members that their monthly meeting would continue, nonetheless saying, "We see no reason why geology should be permitted to interfere with literature and the pursuit of truth." He was also a founding board member of the Archaeological Society of San Francisco in 1903 at the invitation of Phoebe Hearst, who was its first president.

In recognition of Mr. Wheelan, the Native Daughters and Native Sons presented the Fairfax H. Wheelan Memorial Fountain to the City of San Francisco on March 4, 1928. The dedication of a children¹s drinking fountain in Jefferson Square, San Francisco, paid tribute to “the late Fairfax Henry Wheelan, originator of an effort which has resulted in those orders finding permanent homes for thousands of homeless children”.

Wheelan died of stomach cancer in San Francisco on March 26, 1915 at the age of 58.
