= Coyote Gulch (California) =

Stream in San Francisco, California, US

Coordinates: 37.7977°N 122.4818°W

Coyote Gulch is a stream in San Francisco, California. It is one of the last remaining free flowing, unculverted creeks in San Francisco. It runs from the foothills of the Presidio to the Pacific Ocean. The stream often is confused with another stream that defines the boundary of Baker Beach and China Beach that is basically Lobos Creek after it goes through the filtration system.

The Name Coyote Gulch also was used to refer to the area surrounding Baker Beach (present-day Sea Cliff neighborhood) around the time of Yerba Buena.

1997, "Kern" and others on the advisory board found the toxic-waste landfill that has now been transformed to Coyote Gulch. The Army had described it as a disturbed area.

"It's a site hardly anybody knew about it," Kern said.

"We went down in the poison oak, found the concrete and the debris, and asked the Army to go in and test it," he said. "They found contamination. Eventually everyone agreed that it needed to be excavated. Now it's a beautiful ravine with a creek running through it and open views down to the crashing waves along Baker Beach. It's a fantastic addition to the Presidio rather than a waste dump."

== Notes ==
2. Miracle of Coyote Gulch 2006-02-09
