= China Beach, San Francisco =

Small cove in San Francisco, California

China Beach
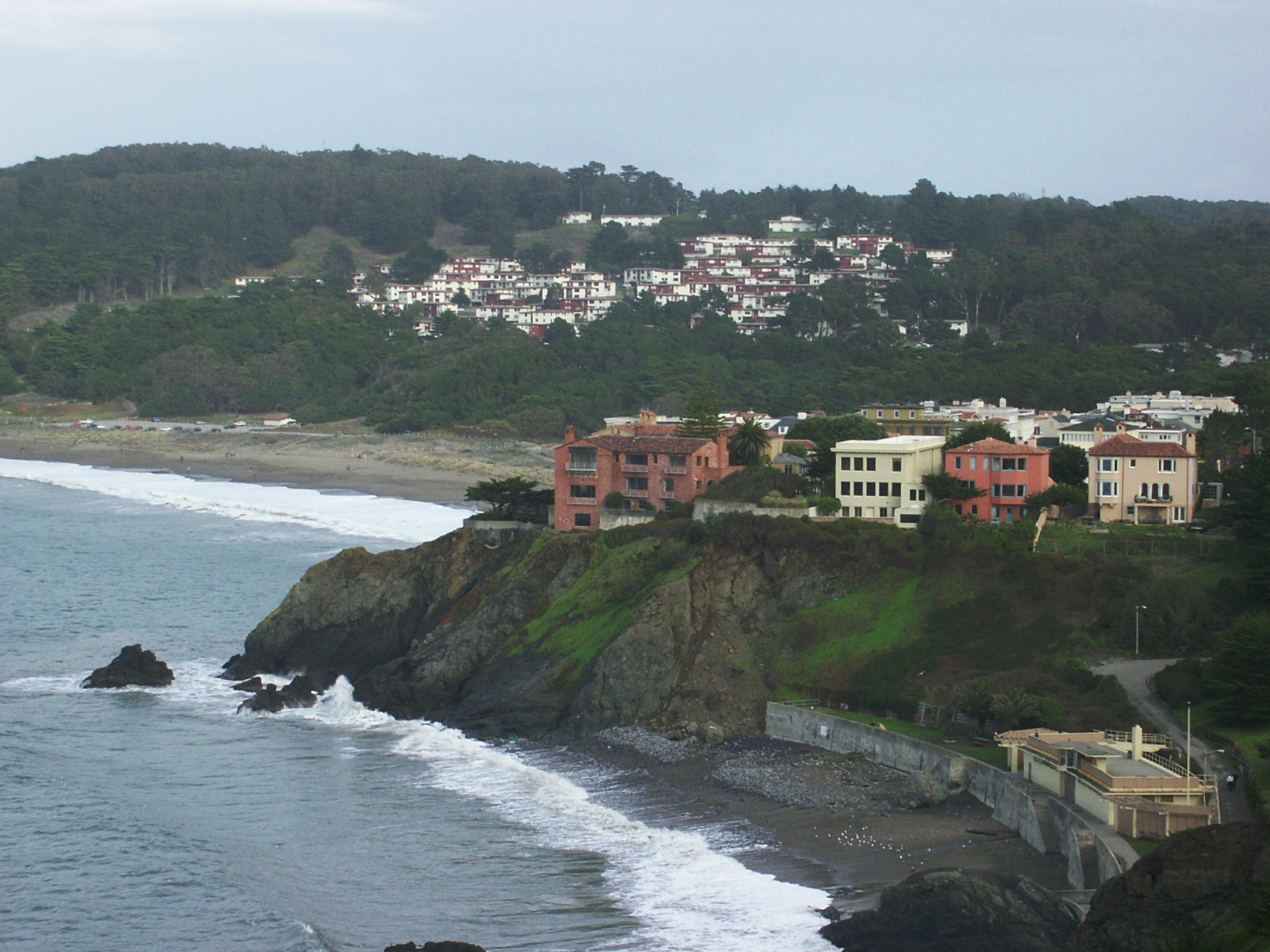
- China Beach is seen in the foreground with the sea wall.

- Location within San Francisco County Location within California Location within the United States
- Interactive map of China Beach
- Location: San Francisco, California, United States
- Coordinates: 37°47′16″N 122°29′35″W
- Operator: Golden Gate National Parks Conservancy
- Website: Official website

China Beach is a small cove in located on the West Side of San Francisco in the city's Sea Cliff neighborhood. It lies between Baker Beach and Lands End and is part of the Golden Gate National Recreation Area. It was once used as a campsite for Chinese fishermen who anchored their boats in the cove. There is a monument to them at the trailhead by the parking area by Sea Cliff Avenue.

It was previously known as James D. Phelan State Beach Park. Swimming is not safe at China Beach because of many possible dangers and the lack of lifeguards in the area. At low tides, there are tide pools, and it is sometimes possible to walk to Baker Beach. China Beach offers a view of the Golden Gate Bridge and the Marin Headlands.

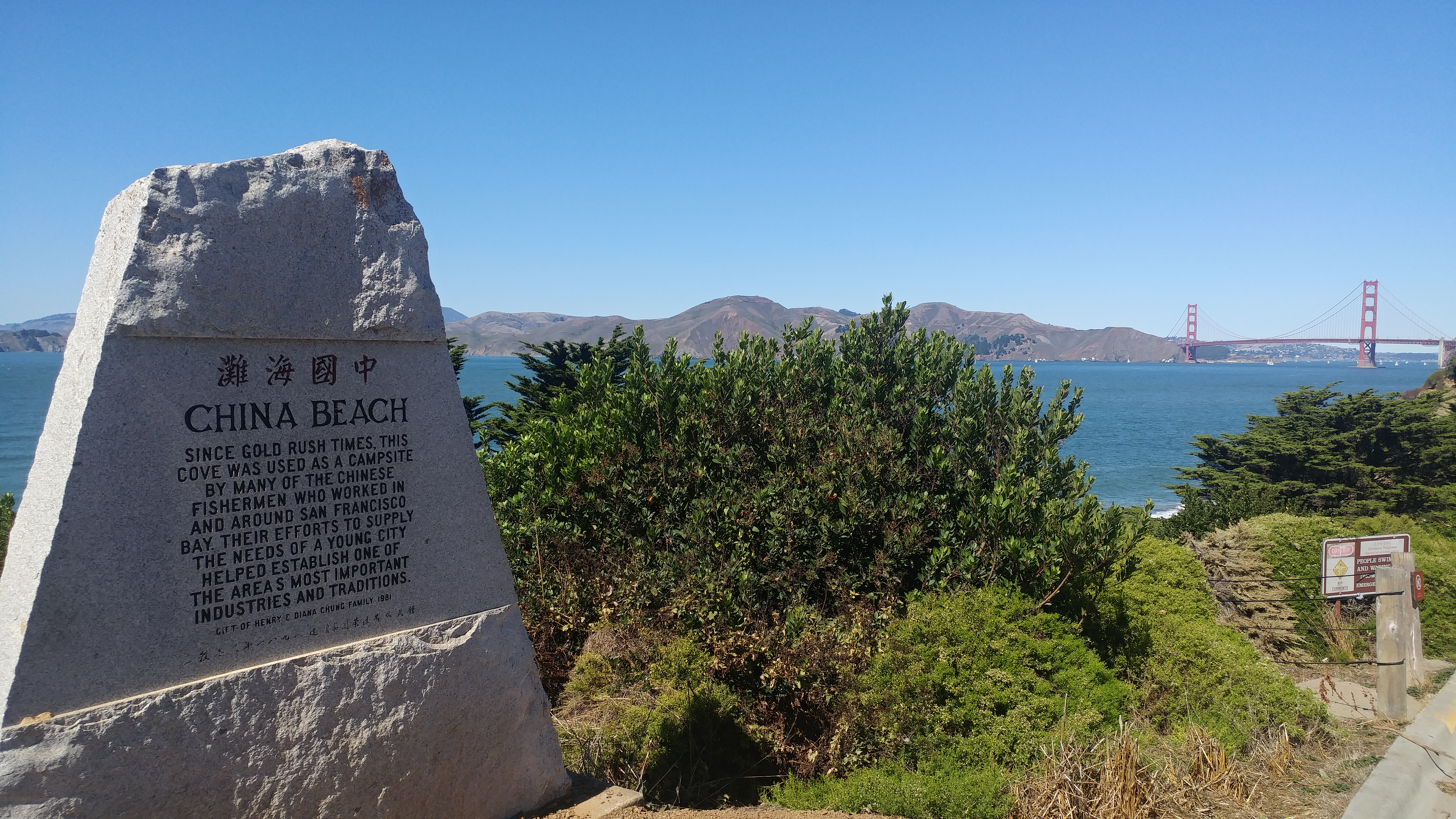
China Beach with Golden Gate Bridge

A marker on the trailhead leading down to the beach reads "CHINA BEACH Since gold rush times, this cove was used as a campsite by many of the Chinese fishermen who worked in and around San Francisco Bay. Their efforts to supply the needs of a young city helped establish one of the area's most important industries and traditions. Gift of Henry & Diana Chung Family 1981."

China Beach is also home to Coyote Gulch, a stream defining the boundary of Baker Beach and China Beach. The stream is constantly changing due to human activities, and natural causes contribute in making the boundary unclear. Children are sometimes seen playing in the stream, but there are concerns of contamination despite conversation efforts.

== See also ==
- List of beaches in California
- List of California state parks
