= Mountain Lake Park =

Park in San Francisco, California

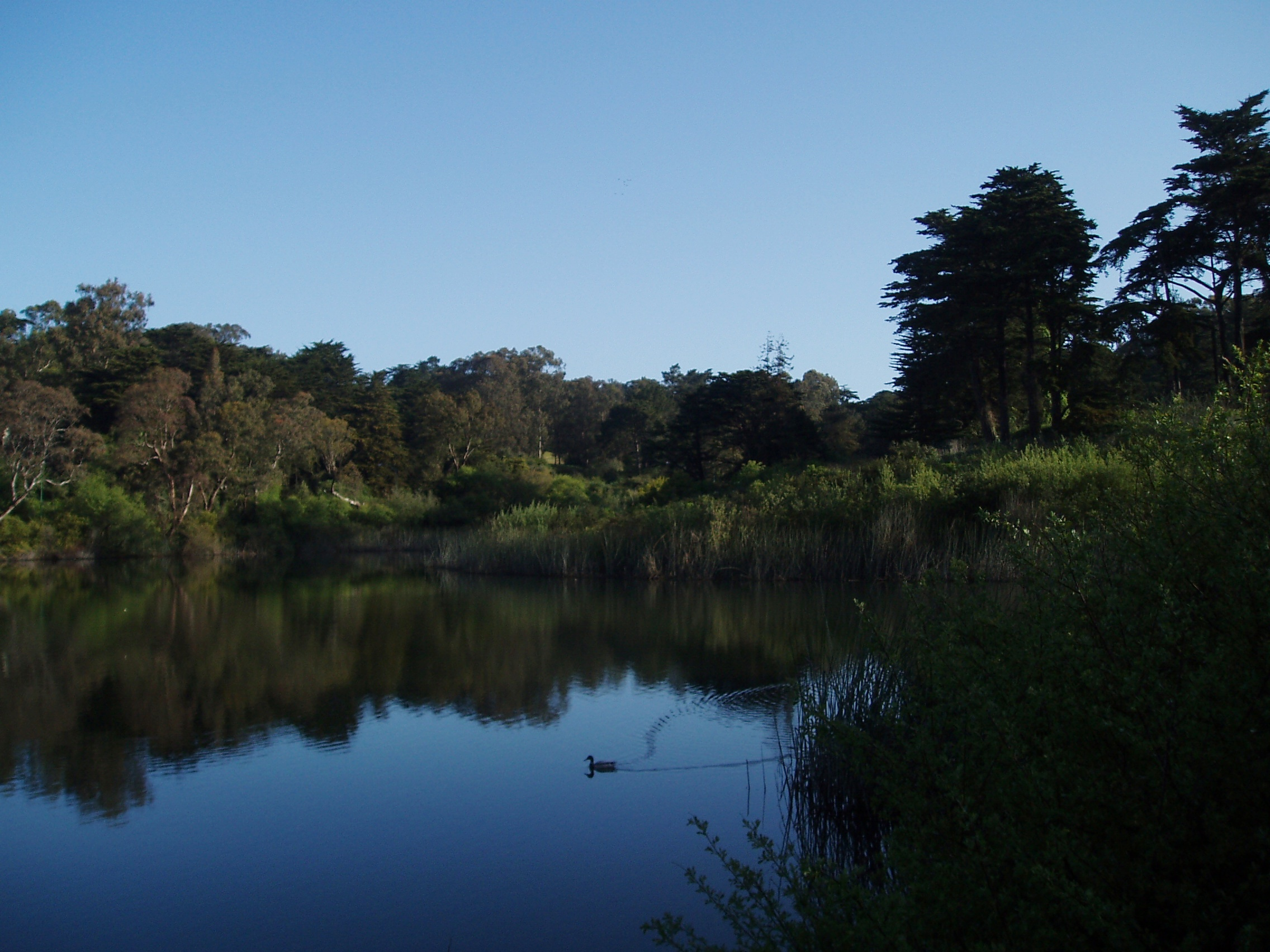
- Mountain Lake at Mountain Lake Park

- Location within San Francisco Location within California Location within the United States
- Type: Municipal (San Francisco)
- Location: 9th and Lake Streets, San Francisco
- Coordinates: 37°47′13″N 122°28′5″W
- Area: 14 acres (5.7 ha)
- Created: 1875
- Status: Open all year
- Website: Official website

Mountain Lake Park is a 14-acre (5.7 ha) park located in Richmond District on the West Side of San Francisco. Situated north of the intersection of Lake and Funston, the park was designed by engineer William Hammond Hall in the late 19th century (circa 1875). Hall also designed Golden Gate Park and was significantly influenced by Frederick Law Olmsted.

== History ==
Spanish explorer Juan Bautista de Anza ended his second northward expedition at the lake, stopping for two days in 1776. While here he located a site for the Spanish presidio that was later built. A plaque was placed in September 1957 near the point where he stayed.

Fill taken from the cut to build the MacArthur Tunnel was dumped near Mountain Lake during the construction of the Funston Avenue approach to the Golden Gate Bridge in 1939. The fill was used to compress marshy lands but also reduced the size of the lake. The US Army imposed conditions on the approval of construction permits through the Presidio, including requiring the drainage of runoff from the Funston Avenue approach into Mountain Lake, rather than onto Presidio lands.

== Mountain Lake ==
Mountain Lake is a 4-acre (1.6 ha) body of water east of State Route 1 (Park Presidio Boulevard). The lake is at the southern tip of the Presidio of San Francisco and just south of the Presidio Golf Course. It is one of the last natural lakes in San Francisco and the only natural lake in the Golden Gate National Recreation Area. The only natural freshwater lakes in San Francisco are Pine Lake, Lake Merced, and Mountain Lake.

In 1897, water from the lake was used to irrigate the newly built golf course at the Presidio, dropping the water level from its original 30-foot (9.1 m) depth. Park Presidio Boulevard was constructed for the Funston approach directly over the western shore of the lake, which reduced the size of the lake as well. Since runoff from the Funston approach was directed into the lake, golf course pesticides and lead emissions from cars burning leaded gasoline were dumped into the lake over many years. The lake also became a dumping ground for unwanted pets, including crawdads, large-mouth bass, goldfish, carp, bullfrogs, turtles, and even an alligator, which was discovered and removed in 1996.

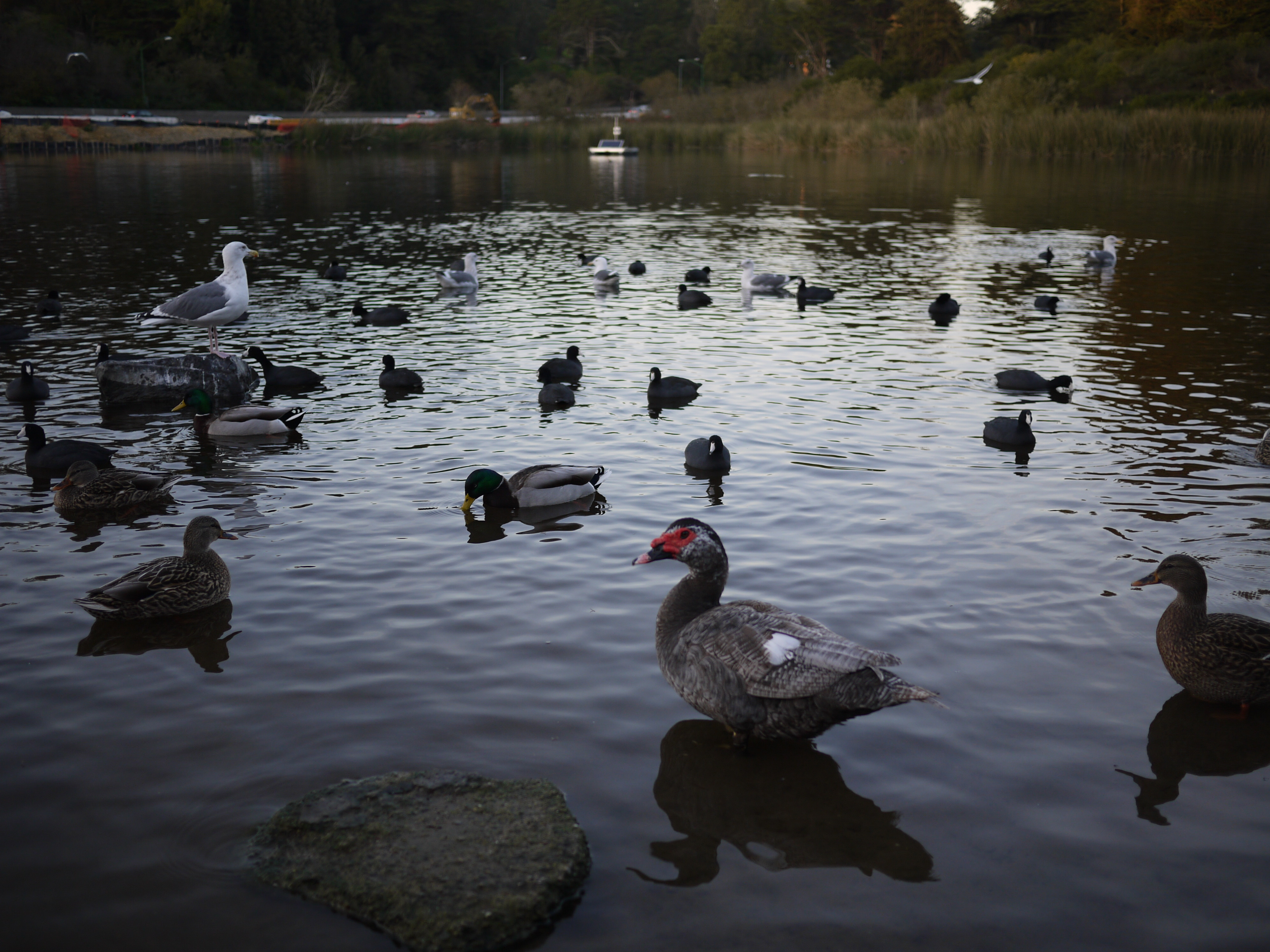
Waterfowl at Mountain Lake (2012)

A variety of birds can be observed around the lake's water, including California seagulls and ducks. On the eastern and southern sides of the lake, native plants have been planted.

The aquifers under Mountain Lake feed Lobos Creek.

=== Golden Gator ===
In October 1996, a male alligator, 3 feet 2 inches (0.97 m) in length, was removed from Mountain Lake by San Francisco Zoo associate curator John Aikin. The alligator, nicknamed "Golden Gator" by a reader poll in the San Francisco Examiner over other potential names such as "Van Nessie", "Presidio Domingo", "Purse Futura", "Boots", "Chewmanchew" and "Darth Gator", was first reported by a retired architect and birdwatcher, Dan Bushnell, in August 1996. Neighborhood rumors, which had been circulating for weeks by August, said the alligator was dumped by a former owner.

The hunt for the alligator quickly became a good-natured publicity contest between the city's two daily newspapers, the Chronicle and the Examiner. The Chronicle attempted to catch the alligator along with officials from the National Park Service and Zoo curators, but received ridicule from professional alligator hunters, who said the apparatus that had been used (a salmon net) was unsuitable and offered advice. One of the professional hunters, Jimmie Long, stated that he would be able to catch the alligator within 15 minutes and the Chronicle sponsored a trip for him and his wife to fly to San Francisco to hunt the alligator. The Examiner responded by sending executive editor Phil Bronstein and reporter Dennis Opatrny, outfitted in wet suits, to try to humanely capture the reptile first, as Long was noted to make his living by selling captured alligators for their hide and meat.

Since there was no official alligator agency in California, Mayor Willie Brown gave verbal permission for Long to proceed. Long, a licensed alligator control agent, brought his own gator lures and gear, including a fishing pole and line with a triple hook. The first night, Long called the alligator using a call he learned from his father, but the alligator did not respond. While at the Zoo during the second day to strategize, Long mentioned that he had never been to a major league baseball game, which was misreported by a local television station that he was at a ballgame while the alligator made an unexpected appearance in the lake. The afternoon of the second day, Bronstein and Opatrny were turned back from the water's edge by San Francisco Police Sgt. Mike Dempsey, who cited a city regulation prohibiting swimming in the lake. The second night, the crowds gathered around the lake and provided a sufficient distraction so the shy reptile did not appear. Long announced he was done for the night, but returned to the lake after midnight and the crowds had dispersed, with no luck. On the third day, the alligator made an appearance but stayed in the reeds and only approached to within 40 yards (37 m). Long cast his hook, but the alligator ignored it and went back under cover. Eventually, Long was unable to catch the alligator after three days of searching. As he was returning home, Long, who had previously toured local sights during his stay, expressed appreciation, regret, and confusion saying "San Francisco is the most beautiful city in the world. I can't wait to get home. And I don't believe I will ever understand the newspaper business."

Longtime Chronicle columnist Herb Caen weighed in with two suggested names, "Da Croc" and "Herb Cayman." KBAE, a radio station in Horseshoe Bay, Texas broadcast frequent updates on the alligator and one of the listeners, Shelli Spruiell, wrote new lyrics to Elton John's song "Crocodile Rock" in homage. Worried the cold weather might spell the creature's doom, the Examiner reassured readers that as long as it truly was an alligator, not a caiman, it would survive the winter in San Francisco. Both the Chronicle and Examiner were criticized for drumming up too much publicity, which made catching the alligator more difficult, and for wasting resources on covering a relatively unimportant story.

After his removal from Mountain Lake, Golden Gator was temporarily housed at the San Francisco Zoo in a heated pond, converted from a monkey cage in the primate center, where he was measured and sexed. In December 1996, Golden Gator was flown to New Orleans, where he was released into the 500-acre (200 ha) Freeport-McMoRan Audubon Species Survival Center managed by the Audubon Nature Institute. The alligator's departure from the Zoo was marked by cake and a greeting card.

=== Myrtle ===
Another famous animal resident of Mountain Lake was Myrtle, a non-native whooper swan who was flightless after being pinioned. Myrtle was well known in the neighborhood for disrupting traffic while crossing Lake Street and stealing snacks from the nearby Lake Market at 12th and Lake. Other antics included visiting regular park patrons, watching tennis players, and attending picnics. San Francisco Zoo officials believed the swan had imprinted on people sometime in the past. Her last human "mate" was local resident Chuck Lantz, who lives next to Mountain Lake Park. Shortly after dawn each morning Myrtle would loudly "whoop" at his back door, moving around the block and up his stairs until he responded and walked her back to the park.

In 1992, Myrtle was noted to have resided at the park since at least 1985. A local transient claimed to have moved Myrtle from the Palace of Fine Arts in the Marina District to Mountain Lake Park after seeing her being harassed by a group of young men. Myrtle was transported from the park to the Zoo in February 1992 to convalesce from an apparent bite wound on the neck, possibly caused by dogs or raccoons. Myrtle's removal to the Zoo was preceded by the removal of two swans from the park in 1991.

While visibly ill in June 1997, Myrtle was again removed from the park to the Zoo without incident, and she was subsequently treated for lead poisoning and a fungal infection in her lungs. While the lake was being treated to remove lead in the sediment, Myrtle was moved in November 1997 to a temporary refuge at E and T Waterfowl, a ranch north of Sebastopol.

== Amenities ==
A playground and tennis court are on the southern side of Mountain Lake. A hiking trail that starts at Funston and Lake weaves along the southern side of the lake and then continues east along the southern edge of the Presidio. The trail forks at the southeast corner of the lake as the other trail turns northward, weaving around the wilder eastern and northern sides of the lake before going under Highway 1.

In addition to the playground and tennis courts already mentioned, there are other amenities. One of the oldest Parcourses (a "fitness trail") in San Francisco (installed 1974) has exercise stations around the perimeter of the park. Many of these were renovated by San Francisco Recreation and Parks Department in 2009. There is a cinder block structure opposite the 9th Avenue entrance known by neighbors as the "card shack", which has picnic tables and is a popular location for birthday and neighborhood parties. Each year a neighborhood park support group, the Friends of Mountain Lake Park, organize a Party in the Park to which all neighbors are invited. The park has two meadows, one larger than the other. The large meadow is widely used for picnics, team soccer and lacrosse practice, and general relaxation. Users can reserve most of the facilities in the park by obtaining a permit from the Recreation and Parks Department.

At the eastern end of Mountain Lake Park, inside 8th Avenue, is an area set aside for owners to take their dogs off leash for exercise and socialization. It is a widely used neighborhood gathering place.

The Friends of Mountain Lake Park and the Recreation and Park Department organize regular park cleanups and plantings.

== See also ==
- Parks in San Francisco, California
