= Battery Chamberlin =

- Six-Inch Rifled Gun No. 9
- U.S. National Register of Historic Places
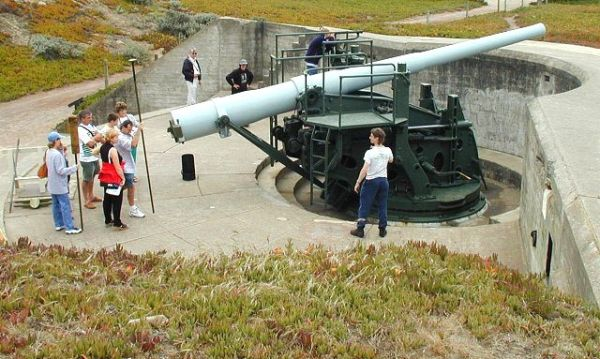
- Docent explaining "gun drill" procedures to park visitors as part of the gun's demonstration. The rifle is in the "in battery" or firing position. When "out of battery" for loading the gun barrel is hidden from the sea behind the parapet, and the breech is just above the loading platform.
- Location: San Francisco, California
- Coordinates: 37°47′38.44″N 122°28′57.7″W
- NRHP reference No.: 79000255
- Added to NRHP: November 7, 1976

Battery Chamberlin is an artillery battery in the Presidio of San Francisco, San Francisco, California, United States. The battery is named in honor of Captain Lowell A. Chamberlin, who had served with distinction in the Civil War. It was added to the National Register of Historic Places on November 7, 1976.

== History ==
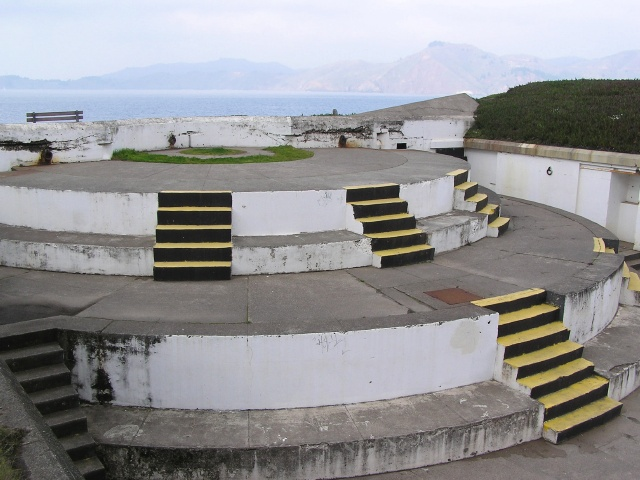
Battery Chamberlin

This Endicott-era battery was built in 1904 with four six-inch rifled guns mounted on disappearing carriages and was intended to protect underwater minefields laid outside the Golden Gate during the time of war. These guns had a maximum range of 7.5 miles, and crews were trained to fire two rounds per minute. The original guns were removed in 1917 for use in World War I.

The battery received two six-inch guns on simple barbette carriages in 1920. During World War II, the Sixth Coast Artillery (Harbor Defense) Regiment, Battery "D", manned the two guns at Battery Chamberlin, living on-site until the end of the war. The battery was covered with camouflage netting to hide it from air attack. These guns were removed in 1948.

In 1977, the National Park Service received 6-inch Gun M1905 (#9 Watervliet) on Disappearing Carriage M1903 (#2 Watertown, each listed individually in the National Register of Historic Places, from the Smithsonian Institution. The gun and carriage were installed at gun emplacement No. 4 at Battery Chamberlin and are the similar to those installed in 1904. This is one of about a score of disappearing guns in the world that still operates, moving from loading to firing position.

Operation of the gun is open to the public, usually on the first full weekend of each month from 11 a.m. to 3 p.m. An underground magazine contains photos and small exhibits on the harbor defenses of San Francisco. The battery is located at the north end of the parking lot at Baker Beach.
