= Baker Beach =

Public beach near San Francisco in the United States

Coordinates: 37°47.592′N 122°29.04′W

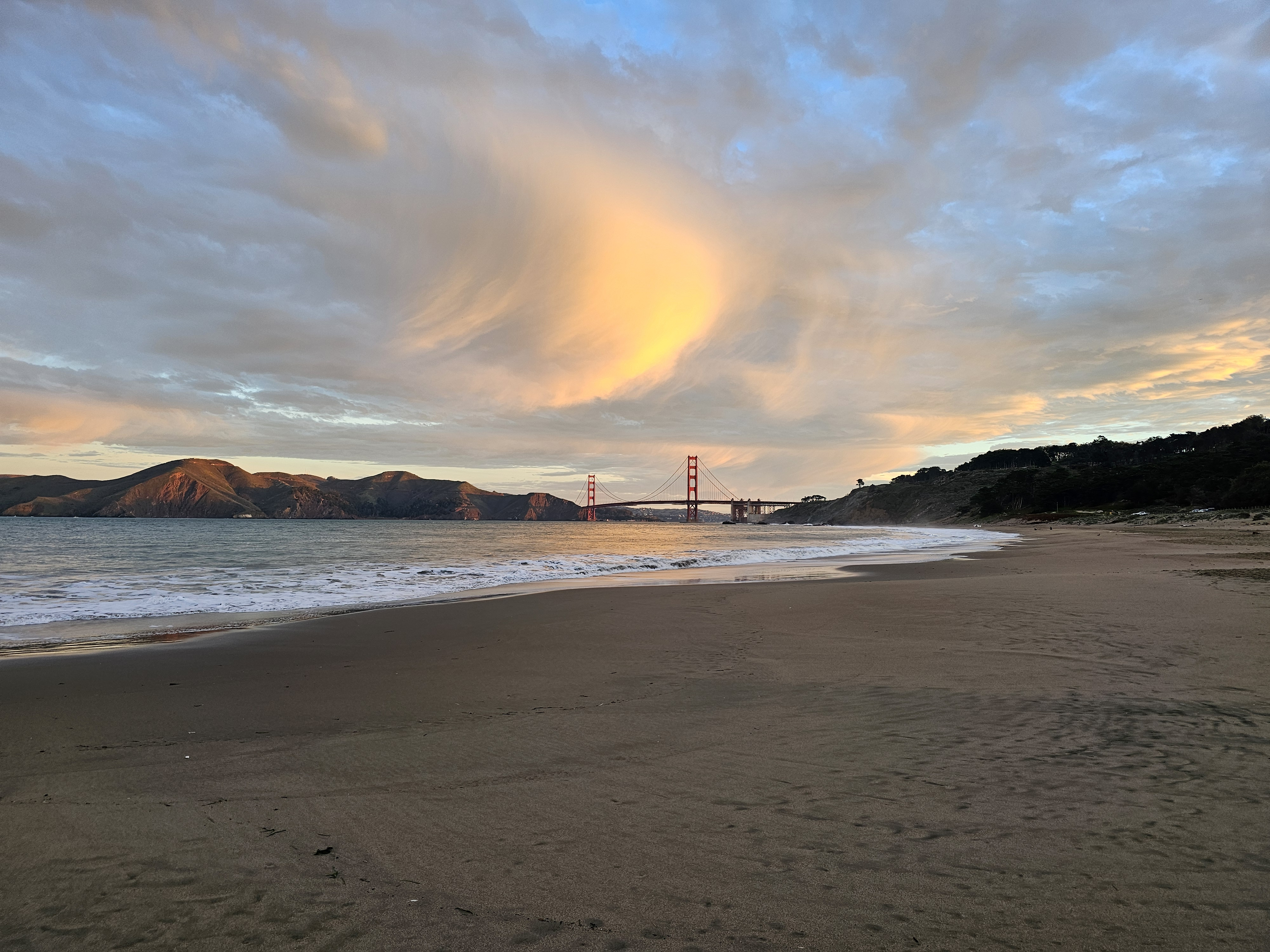
Baker Beach with the Golden Gate Bridge in the background

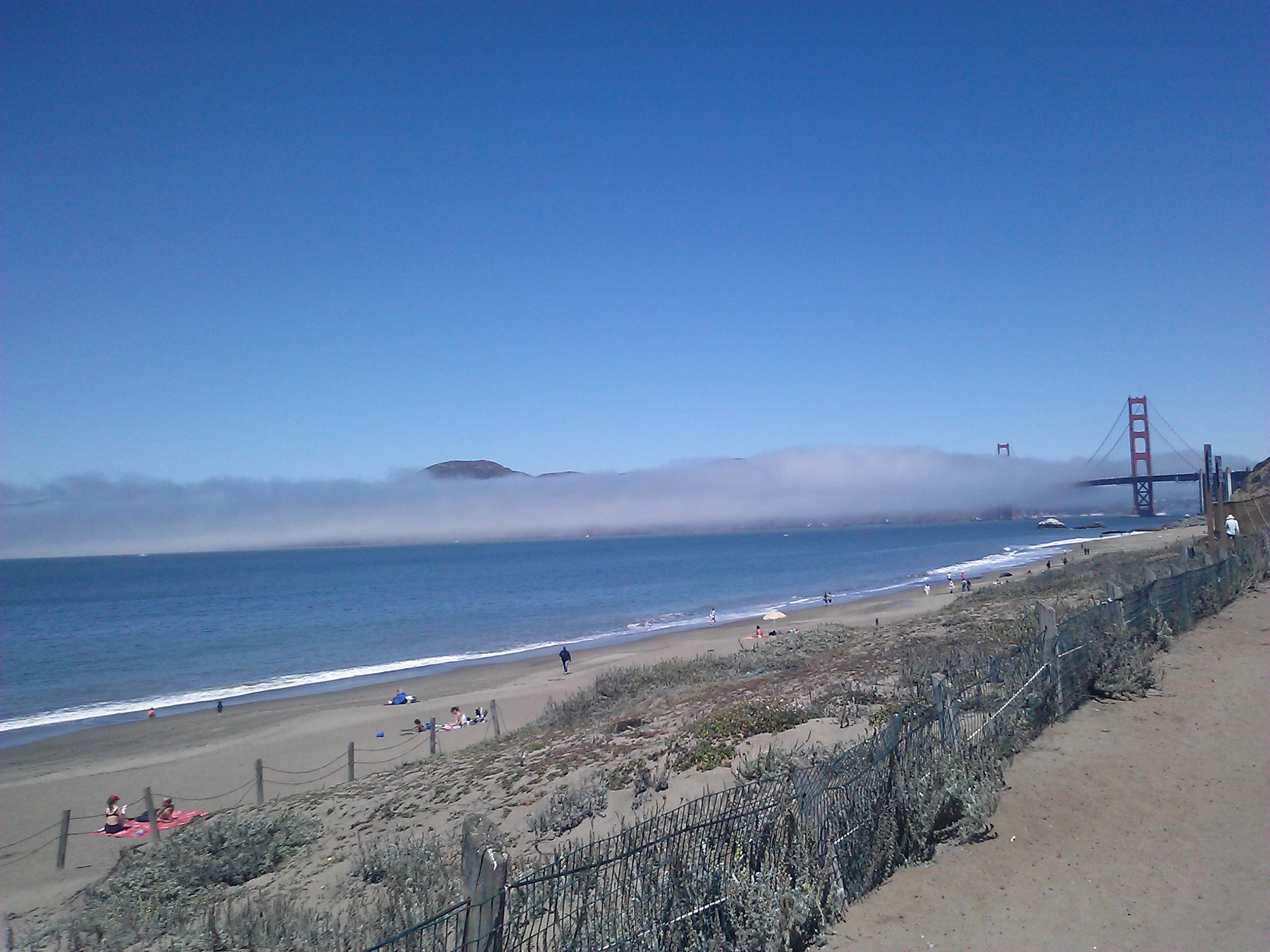
Baker Beach with fog rolling across the Golden Gate strait and bridge

Baker Beach is a public beach on the peninsula of San Francisco, California, United States. The beach lies on the shore of the Pacific Ocean in the West Side of the city. It is roughly a 0.5 mi (800 m) long, beginning just south of Golden Gate Point (where the Golden Gate Bridge connects with the peninsula), extending southward toward the Seacliff peninsula, the Palace of the Legion of Honor and the Sutro Baths. The northern section of Baker Beach is "frequented by clothing-optional sunbathers," and as such it is considered a nude beach.

== History ==
Baker Beach is part of the Presidio, which was a military base from the founding of San Francisco by the Spanish in 1812 until 1997.

In 1904, it was fortified with disappearing gun installations known as Battery Chamberlin, which can still be viewed today.

When the Presidio was decommissioned as a U.S. Army base, it became part of the Golden Gate National Recreation Area, which is administered by the National Park Service.

The 160 acres (65 ha) property was settled by John Henry Baker in the 1850s and was known as Golden Gate Milk Ranch. The property location description varied, but is generally described as being approximately 4 mi (6.4 km) west of the city on the then Point Lobos Road (now Geary Blvd.)

Baker died in 1863 and his widow, Maria, lost the property to foreclosure in 1879. In 1897, Baker's grandson, Fairfax Henry Wheelan sued to have the title returned to the heirs of John H. Baker, claiming that Baker's widow did not have the legal power to mortgage the property.

From 1986 to 1990, the north end of Baker Beach was the original site of the Burning Man art festival. In 1990, park police allowed participants to raise the traditional large statue but not to set it on fire, since the beach enforces a limit on the size of any campfires. Subsequent Burning Man events have taken place in Black Rock Desert, Nevada.

A fatal shark attack occurred on Baker Beach on May 7, 1959, when 18-year-old Albert Kogler Jr. was attacked by a great white shark while he was in water 15 ft (4.5 m) deep. This was the only shark attack recorded on Baker Beach.

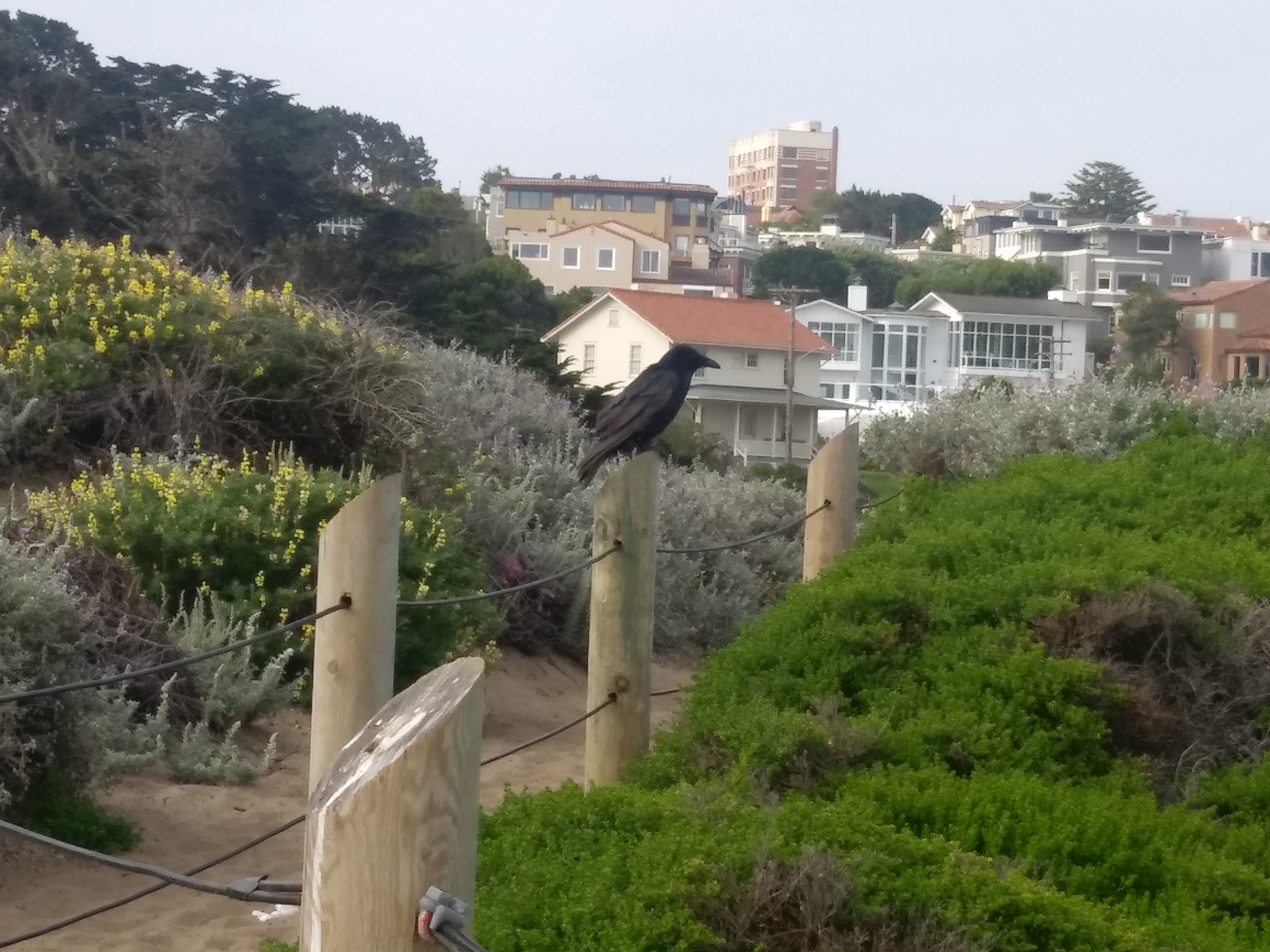
Baker Beach path with shrubs and crow

Large outcrops of serpentine cliffs occur along the Pacific coast near Baker Beach. When rising from the land surface, serpentine produces a low-calcium, high-magnesium soil that can allow for rare species of plants to develop in the vicinity. This may explain the presence of Hesperolinon congestum (the Marin Dwarf Flax, a threatened plant) in surrounding areas.

To the north of the beach is Marshall's Beach and was the site of a Japanese Type 93 torpedo embedded in the beach sand in 1946. Historian Mark Felton believes it was fired by Japanese submarine I-15 in 1941, which was sailing near the waters off San Francisco.

== See also ==
- List of beaches in California
- List of California state parks
