= Lincoln Manor =

Coordinates: 37°46′50.0″N 122°29′52.2″W

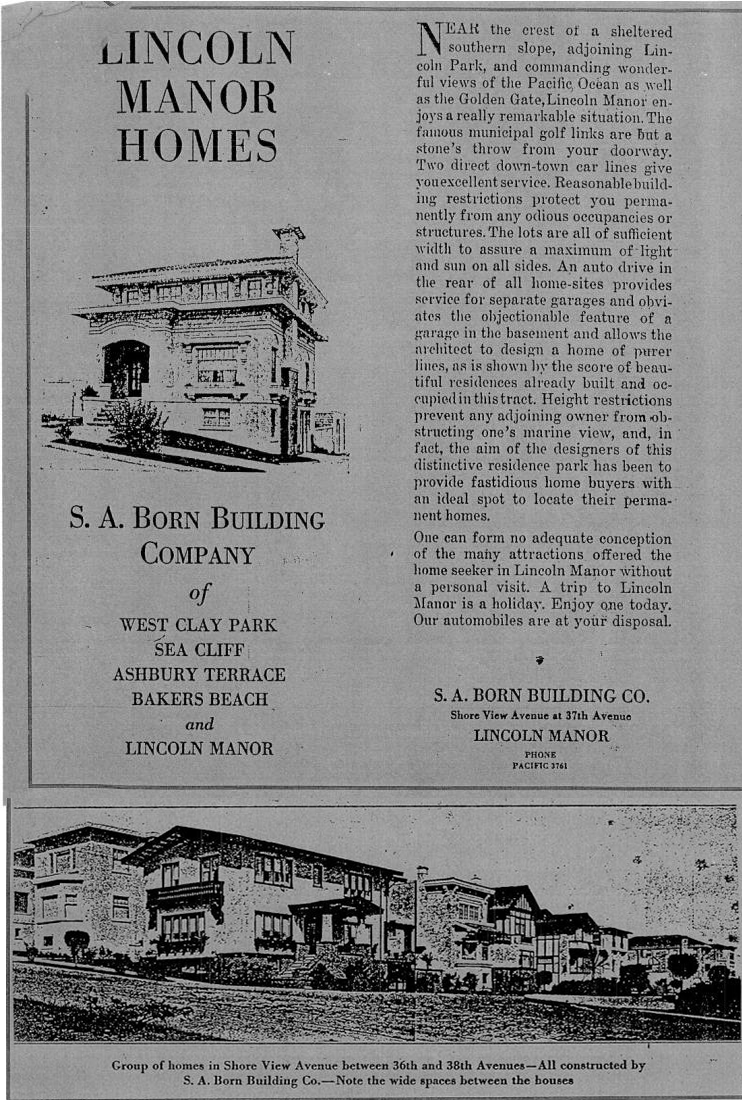
An early advertisement for Lincoln Manor homes. Top photo shows the residence of Stephen A. Borne, Lincoln Manor developer, and the bottom photo shows the houses at the corner of 38th and Shore View Avenue. This tri-fold advertisement has been modified to view on one page.

Lincoln Manor is one of the master-planned residence parks in the West Side of San Francisco, with the others including Sea Cliff, St. Francis Wood, Presidio Terrace, West Clay Park, Forest Hill, Balboa Terrace, Ingleside Terraces, and Jordan Park. Lincoln Manor, established in 1914, is located within the Richmond District, in the northwest portion of San Francisco. Lincoln Manor is bounded by 36th Avenue to the east, 38th Avenue to the west, Clement Street to the north, and Geary Boulevard to the south, and is bisected by Shore View Avenue. The tract features a slight rise in elevation, which provides houses in Lincoln Manor with a view south toward the Pacific Ocean. Its single-family generally large detached homes were developed between approximately 1914-1916 by Lyon & Hoag as a so-called "restricted residence park," built by the S.A. Born Building Company, builders of West Clay Park and Sea Cliff. Lincoln Manor was promoted by its developers as a residence park with ocean views facing south instead of west. The enclave abuts Land's End, Lincoln Park, and the Legion of Honor, and is close to Sea Cliff, the Balboa Street shopping district, and the Katherine Delmar Burke School.

== Architectural style ==
As a San Francisco Chronicle article described in 2004, Lincoln Manor's "detached, stucco and wood-sided, two-story Edwardian villas with small front lawns, mix classical friezes with Arts and Crafts exposed roof rafters." A number of the model homes were designed by architect Ida McCain, who designed hundreds of homes in San Francisco in the 1910s, which made her one of the most prolific female architects from the 1910s to the 1930s. McCain went on to design a handful of other homes in Lincoln Manor, including the home of prominent real estate developer Stephen A. Born, who developed Lincoln Manor and lived in the neighborhood at the corner of 38th Avenue and the alley known as "Auto Drive". The S.A. Born Company hired Ida McCain to design houses in Lincoln Manor, and the San Francisco Chronicle has attributed to architect McCain the four residences starting on the corner of 38th Avenue and Shore View Avenue heading north on 38th Avenue, which originally were the residences of Frederick J. Linz, Margaret Owens, W.B. Hoag, and Stephen A. Born, respectively. Those first houses designed by Ida McCain were at 414 38th Avenue, 420 38th Avenue, 400 38th Avenue, 428 38th Avenue, and 88 Shore View Avenue.

== Notable residents ==
Notable former residents of Lincoln Manor include:

- George H. Casey (70 Shore View Avenue), a member of the executive board of the 1934 campaign to elect Republican Frank F. Merriam as governor, was the general manager of the Pacific Fruit Exchange.
- Quentin L. Kopp, retired judge, member of the San Francisco Board of Supervisors, member of the California State Senate, and namesake of the Interstate 380 connector ("Quentin L. Kopp Freeway").
- Frederick J. Linz and his wife Bernice W. Linz (88 Shore View Avenue) were two of the earliest Lincoln Manor residents when they bought their home in 1916. Fred Linz was a prominent auto dealer in San Francisco. Mrs. Frederick J. Linz (as Bernice was always described in the media) was a pioneer in advocating that women drive and race "motor cars" (even comparing women's efforts to drive cars to the suffrage movement); founded and was president of the California Women's Auto Association; was a frequent car racer; and was a prolific and nationally recognized writer on the topic of "motoring" on the Pacific coast. In fact, Mrs. Linz was described at the time as "California’s Most Famous Woman Motorist."
- In the 1930s, John M. Kennedy and his wife Hazel lived at 88 Shore View Avenue; John M. Kennedy ran for San Francisco Board of Supervisors in 1933, and he was head of The Kennedy-ten Bosch Company.
- King Norman (Norman Rosenberg) and his wife, Doris Rosenberg (corner of Shore View Avenue and 37th Avenue). King hosted his own children's television program in the 1950s and 1960s and ran twenty-one toy stores across Northern California.
- Edith Shoemaker (17 Shore View Avenue) was a long time U.S. figure skating judge, during the 1960s and 1970s.
- The Philippine consulate (45 Shore View Avenue) was located at the corner of Shore View Avenue and 37th Avenue.
- Laurette Goldberg (45 Shore View Avenue), in 1981, "launched the Philharmonia Baroque Orchestra of the West, the first full orchestra using period instruments in the western United States." At the time of her death in 2005, the group was the largest of its kind in the country and regularly performed in Berkeley, San Francisco, Palo Alto and Los Angeles.
- George Whitsell, guitarist with The Rockets, who appeared on Neil Young's Tonight's the Night and On the Beach albums.
