= Westwood Highlands, San Francisco =

Neighborhood of San Francisco, California

Westwood Highlands
- Neighborhood of San Francisco
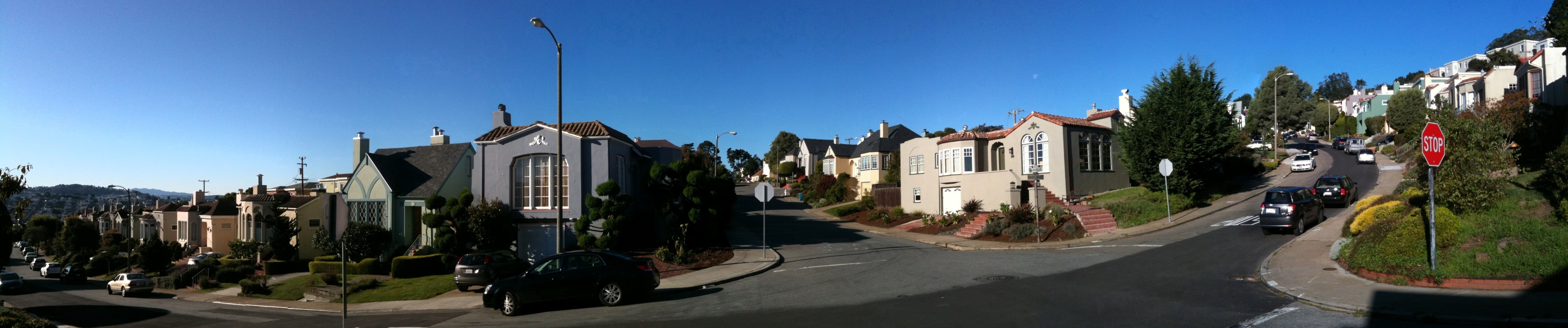
- Panoramic view of the neighborhood in 2010

- Location within Central San Francisco
- Coordinates: 37.7347°N 122.456854°W

Government
  - Supervisor: Sean Elsbernd
  - Assemblymember: Catherine Stefani (D)
  - State Senator: Scott Wiener (D)
  - U.S. House: Nancy Pelosi (D)

Area
  - Total: 0.46 km^{2} (0.178 sq mi)

Population (2008)
  - Total: 1,782
  - Density: 3,856/km^{2} (9,986/sq mi)
- ZIP Code: 94127
- Area codes: 415/628

Westwood Highlands is a small neighborhood located on the West Side of San Francisco, California, northeast of the intersection of Monterey Boulevard and Plymouth Avenue. It is bordered by Westwood Park to the south, Saint Francis Wood to the west, Sherwood Forest to the north, and Sunnyside to the east. Mt. Davidson, the highest point in San Francisco, lies just northeast.

Westwood Highlands covers an area of 0.178 square miles, with a population of 1,782 as of 2009. The median household income in Westwood Highlands is $116,573, compared to a median of $70,770 for the city of San Francisco.

Westwood Highlands is a subdivision development comprising 283 homes built between 1925 and 1929. The subdivision is bound by five intersecting arterial roads. Westwood Highlands was one of the first residential communities in the United States to agree to a set of covenants and restrictions.

== History ==
In 1906, San Francisco was shaken by one of the most damaging earthquakes in the history of America, followed by subsequent fires that enveloped the city and caused further destruction. Developers and planners alike used the aftermath as a catalyst for redevelopment. This redevelopment saw previously barren farmland, such as the area around Twin Peaks, being turned into low- to medium-density residential housing.

In 1918, the Twin Peaks Tunnel was opened, facilitating the construction of new suburbs and development. Muni Metro ran comprehensive train services through the tunnel that led out to the surrounding regions, including West Portal and Ingleside Terraces, allowing the public to finally gain easy access to the area. The tunnel also reduced travel time into downtown San Francisco dramatically, from almost an hour down to just twenty minutes; from this, the notion of the commuter suburb was born.

The realtors of Westwood Highlands were the well-established Baldwin and Howell Company, known for their emphasis on improving and integrating communities through design and layout. Working in correlation with a builder, Hans Nelson, and an architect, Charles Strothoff, Baldwin and Howell designed this commuter suburb with the intention of harvesting "efficient and economical design… for a middle-class market". Unlike surrounding neighborhoods that had an eclectic mix of architectural styles, the houses of Westwood Highlands were built according to specific design parameters that ensured cohesion and unity throughout the subdivision.

== Planning considerations ==
In the planning of Westwood Highlands, careful consideration was given to the public façade of houses. Strothoff based the housing stock on the modular system of design that allowed for interchangeable components to be added or subtracted. The principle of modules allowed units to be configured in different ways; Strothoff utilized three interchangeable modules: the window, entrance, and garage. Generally, most dwellings conformed to three-module configurations that allowed for the greatest variation in the street; however, two- and four-module houses were not uncommon. From the streetscape, this system provided both unity and diversity: each house could conform to various configurations without essentially altering the overall design character of the neighborhood. This ensured that not only were the design elements regulated, but also the overall appearance of the streets.

The elevation and natural topography of Westwood Highlands were used to its advantage. While the rest of San Francisco was dominated by the grid organization, Westwood Highlands adopted the system of curvilinear streets, which naturally fitted the steep environment. Corner lots had a dual purpose in both complementing the curvilinear streets and binding the community neighborhood. The corner block provided a private-public relationship with the intersection. In the planning of Westwood Highlands, corner lots were designed to ensure they faced the street intersection on the diagonal. It was used as a systematic means of ‘softening ‘ the relationship between the public streets and the private nature of the houses suggesting a more open neighborhood community.

Another consideration in the planning of Westwood Highlands was the hierarchy of streets and lots. In previous developments in surrounding areas such as Westwood Park and Saint Francis Wood, lots were sold as empty parcels of land in which private owners could develop as they wished. In Westwood Highlands, lots were marketed and sold as a complete package, with a predetermined existing designed house. The topography was influential in determining the value of each lot. Dwellings on steeper gradients generally had smaller lots (and subsequently smaller houses) with views of the city, while larger lots had more affordable houses and were generally located on the outer-eastern boundaries of the development.

== Influences ==
While Westwood Highlands was partly an instinctive response to the 1906 earthquake disaster, it was also a reaction to the increasing population trends of the time. This private development movement had many influences on town planning, and Westwood Highlands established some important influences on the private development planning in the United States. Firstly, in relation to planning and practice, Baldwin and Howell, as mentioned previously, were marketing lots in Westwood Highlands as complete packages and in doing so promoting a lifestyle that was community centric, affordable, and livable. The notion of middle-class residential living was also a large trademark in the promotion of the area.

The Real Estate Associates, founded by real estate mogul William Hollis in 1886, became one of the largest developers in the late nineteenth century. They set guidelines for the development of housing lots in the San Francisco Bay Area. Some guidelines were infused into the planning and development of the Westwood Highlands, such as the notion of wealth organization and spatial hierarchy. The controls over design and layout of the houses resembled the contemporary planning restrictions of today, and it was through these covenants that social control in the 1920s was regulated in the public domain. It appears that the role of the realtor in the early twentieth century was not only to develop but to also be responsible for social reconstruction and order.

Westwood Highlands is the archetype of private planning practices in America in the early to mid-twentieth century. Through advocating the suburban lifestyle and the benefits of living in highly controlled and planned communities, Baldwin and Howell forged influential planning practices still evident in the considerations of contemporary planning today.
