= San Francisco Residence Parks =

Neighborhoods in California, US

The San Francisco Residence Parks are located in the western neighborhoods of San Francisco. The first of the master-planned residence parks to be built on the west side of the city was Presidio Terrace in 1905. This was followed by St. Francis Wood, Sea Cliff, Lincoln Manor, West Clay Park, Forest Hill, Balboa Terrace, Ingleside Terraces, and Jordan Park.

The master-planned residence parks in San Francisco were landscaped plots created to replicate the feeling of suburban living in close proximity to downtown. "Inspired by lofty ideals of the City Beautiful and Garden City movements, residence parks had curving boulevards and lush landscaping--trees, greens, and neoclassical ornamentation such as pillars, gateways, public stairways, and sundials." San Francisco's residence parks all had significant restrictions, including prohibitions on commercial activity, yard size, minimum construction costs, and, initially, racial covenants.

After the 1906 earthquake and fire in San Francisco, residence parks in San Francisco were promoted to white-collar residents as an alternative to new housing developments in the East Bay, the Peninsula, and the South Bay. Sales increased significantly in the 1920s, and by the 1930s most tracts in San Francisco residence parks were already constructed.
