= Ida F. McCain =

American architect (1884–1949)

- Born: August 27, 1884; Fort Collins, Colorado, US
- Died: September 18, 1949; Philadelphia, Pennsylvania, US
- Other name: Ida Florence McCain
- Education: Colorado State Agricultural College
- Occupation: architect
- Years active: ca. 1903–ca. 1929

Ida F. McCain (1884–1949) was an early 20th-century American architect active on the West Coast at a time when there were few women in the profession.

== Early life and education ==
Ida Florence McCain was born in Fort Collins, Colorado, on August 27, 1884, to James Milton and Hannah H. Oehlrich McCain. She was one of six children, with brothers Robert, Walter, and William Arthur (who later changed his name to Arthur William), and sisters Emma and Edda (who later changed her name to Eda). Her father died when she was one and her mother remarried, becoming Hannah King. She attended public school and then at the age of 15 entered Colorado State Agricultural College. After her first year in college, while still undecided as to her future career, she discovered that an architectural course had been introduced and decided to take it. Despite her high marks, she was initially turned down for the course, but she persevered and eventually got in, the only woman to register for the course. Although she never got much more formal training than this and never obtained an architect's license at all, she went on to become an extremely successful San Francisco Bay Area architect and builder.

== Architectural career ==
McCain moved in 1903 to Los Angeles, where she worked for church architect Lawrence B. Valk for a year. She then took a job as architect in the Lambert & Bartin building company and after a year was made partner. In 1909, she moved to Portland, Oregon, with her mother, her brother Arthur, and her sister Eda. McCain went into business with Arthur and her sister Eda's husband Charles Spencer, both of whom set themselves up as contractors. They founded the firm Spencer-McCain and built houses in the environs of Portland for about five years, of which at least ten still survive, some in the Laurelhurst area. One of McCain's finest buildings, called an East Side landmark in contemporary newspaper stories, was the C.K. Henry House, a large granite-and-wood building designed in a loose Arts and Crafts style, with such features as internal French doors, mahogany paneling, and a covered sleeping porch with flooring of local tile.

In 1914, McCain returned briefly to Los Angeles and then transferred permanently to the San Francisco Bay Area in 1915. She became an architect for the real estate developers and builders Stephen A. Born (whose architectural department she ran) and Baldwin & Howell, often designing one-of-a-kind homes for their clients. Baldwin & Howell ran advertisements for their Westwood Park development in the area west of Twin Peaks in San Francisco featuring a photograph of McCain, with the ad copy written in the first person, as if by the "expert bungalow designer" herself. Between 1917 and 1923, McCain designed 101 of the approximately 650 bungalows in Westwood Park. Several of these properties she bought and built herself. She also designed and built several apartment buildings in San Francisco and San Mateo. By the mid-1920s, her output had slowed, but she designed buildings in San Mateo Park in San Mateo and in St. Francis Wood. She took out ads in city newspapers playing up her expertise in bungalow design and her ability, as a woman, to anticipate the design needs of "her who spends more time than anyone else within the home."

Altogether, McCain designed several hundred Arts-and-Crafts-inflected and Romantic revival Edwardian bungalows and villas in the Bay Area in the 1910s and 1920s, especially in the middle-class enclaves listed above, plus Lincoln Manor (near Lincoln Park in the Richmond District of San Francisco). At a time when very few women were practicing architects in America, she could be hailed as "San Francisco's Woman Builder" by one leading developer. The best known of her professional rivals in the Bay Area would have been Julia Morgan and Emily Williams, while over in the East Bay Leola Hall was just getting out of building houses around the time that McCain hit her stride.

McCain's bungalows were often somewhat offbeat versions of that staple of informal West Coast living, typified by such features as exposed beams, fireplace inglenooks, pocket doors, big closets, wooden wainscoting, and clinker brick porches. Her two-story villas, for instance in Lincoln Manor, tended to be more formal, elegantly mixing Arts and Crafts details with classical elements and often featuring large dining rooms and open floor plans ideal for entertaining.

After 1929, McCain did not work as an architect. She lived in an apartment building in San Francisco with her mother, which she managed and later purchased. By 1937, she was living with her sister Eda in Santa Cruz, California, where she became involved with the International Peace Mission movement of Father Divine. Still a follower of Father Divine, Ida F. McCain died of melanoma on 18 September 1949 in Philadelphia, Pennsylvania.

== Partial list of buildings ==
- 45 Upper Terrace, San Francisco, California (The Dettner House; 1917)
- 676 Miramar Avenue, San Francisco, California (1917)
- 141 Westwood Drive, San Francisco, California (1917)
- 796 Faxon Avenue, San Francisco, California (1918)
- 1301 Plymouth Avenue, San Francisco, California (1918)
- 1399 Plymouth Avenue, San Francisco, California (1918)
- 701 Miramar Avenue, San Francisco, California (1919)
- 801 Miramar Avenue, San Francisco, California (1919)
- 40 Eastwood Drive, San Francisco, California (1919)
- 895 Faxon Avenue, San Francisco, California (1919)
- 1001 Monterey Boulevard, San Francisco, California (1919)
- 825 Faxon Avenue, San Francisco, California (1920)
- 10 Westwood Drive, San Francisco, California (1921)
- 1492 Plymouth Avenue, San Francisco, California (1921)
- 1500 Plymouth Avenue, San Francisco, California (1922)
- 180 Westwood Drive, San Francisco, California (1922)
- 600 Miramar Avenue, San Francisco, California (1923)
- 475 N.E. Hazelfern, Portland, Oregon (formerly 115 HazelFern Pl; built before 1913; McCain's own residence)
- 3391 N.E. Multnomah St., Portland, Oregon (with Spencer-McCain)
- 1617 S.E. 23rd Ave., Portland, Oregon (with Spencer-McCain)
- 4063 N.E. 29th Ave., Portland, Oregon (with Spencer-McCain)
- 3033 N.E. 63rd Ave., Portland, Oregon ("Hibbard House", with Spencer-McCain)
- 2817 N.E. Dunckley St., Portland, Oregon (with Spencer-McCain)
- 444 N.E. Floral Place, Portland, Oregon (with Spencer-McCain)
- 436 and 475 N.E. Hazelfern Place, Portland, Oregon (with Spencer-McCain)
- 7468 N. Huron Ave., Portland, Oregon (with Spencer-McCain)
- 3641 N.E. Senate St., Portland, Oregon (with Spencer-McCain)
- 2647 S.W. Talbot Rd., Portland, Oregon (with Spencer-McCain)
- 1121 N.E. Glisan St., Portland, Oregon (1912, "Henry House", with Spencer-McCain; torn down 1966)
- 1135 E. Glisan St., Portland, Oregon (1910, "Keeney House", with Spencer-McCain; torn down)
