= Westwood Park, San Francisco =

Residential neighborhood in southwestern San Francisco

Coordinates: 37°43′39.31″N 122°27′29.58″W

Westwood Park is a residential neighborhood located on the West Side of San Francisco, California, near St. Francis Wood and City College of San Francisco. Westwood Park is bordered by Monterey Boulevard to the north, Ocean Avenue to the south, Faxon Avenue to the west, and Frida Kahlo Way (known as Phelan Avenue until 2018) to the east. Architecturally, the neighborhood contains a mix of smaller, more modest Craftsman style and Mediterranean style bungalows on a series of concentric oval-shaped streets. The ovals are bisected by Miramar Avenue, which features a landscaped median planted with a variety of trees. Many streets in this neighborhood have a suffix of "wood," such as Eastwood, Northwood, Wildwood.

== History ==
Baldwin & Howell, one of San Francisco's oldest real estate firms, developed Westwood Park in 1916. Their mission was to create "a modern residence park which was to be a model home community for the family of average means". The main architect, Charles F. Strothoff, designed nearly 500 of the 650 houses in Westwood Park. Ida F. McCain designed just over 100 bungalows for the development. The development spanned over approximately five years, from 1918 through 1923, after World War I ended. From 1918–1923, a series of newspaper advertisements promoted Westwood Park as "an ideal vacation without leaving the city", and a place where you could "give your children the right kind of a start". One advertisement declared "young married people find that the sunshine and fresh air take the place of medicines for their children..." Homebuyers could choose a design for their home from a catalog by the contracting firm of Barrett & Hilp. Homes ranged from five to eight rooms and were sold at different price levels. The Park was laid out in an elongated oval shape with multiple rings radiating out from a central intersection with curvilinear streets, reminiscent of the Olmsted tradition.

The Westwood Park pillars and gateways have been officially designated as historic landmarks by city supervisors. The pillars were constructed in 1916 at three intersections: Miramar Avenue and Monterey Boulevard; Miramar Avenue and Ocean Avenue; and Judson Avenue and Frida Kahlo Way (known as Phelan Avenue at the time). They were designed by architect Louis Christian Mullgardt for Westwood Park developers Archibald S. Baldwin and Josiah Howell.

The residents in Westwood Park formed The Westwood Park Association on March 22, 1917, to serve the community of 650 homes. Westwood Park development's 1917 founding documents read: "No person of African, Japanese, Chinese or any Mongolian descent shall be allowed to purchase, own or lease any real property in said Westwood Park." In 1959, the first black family, Dorothy Mae Provost Adams, and her husband, Artemus Adams, were able to purchase a house in the neighborhood with the help of a third party. Upon learning that the home was sold to a black family, the seller refused to give the Adams the keys to their new home. After six months of failed attempts to convince the seller that they should be allowed to move in, the Adams broke into their own home and began the long-delayed process of moving in.

Although racial restrictions were declared illegal and unenforceable in 1948 by Shelley v. Kraemer, social pressure and threats of violence were used to keep neighborhoods segregated, such as the 1958 cross burning in the nearby neighborhood of Ingleside Terraces.

In 1992, the racial language was removed from the Westwood Park CC&Rs and refiled with the city.

Section IV of the neighborhood's covenants prohibits the construction of "any flats, apartment houses ... nor shall any building be erected thereon excepting only residence or dwelling houses, nor shall more than one residence or dwelling house be erected on any single lot."
