= Forest Hill, San Francisco =

Forest Hill
- Neighborhood of San Francisco
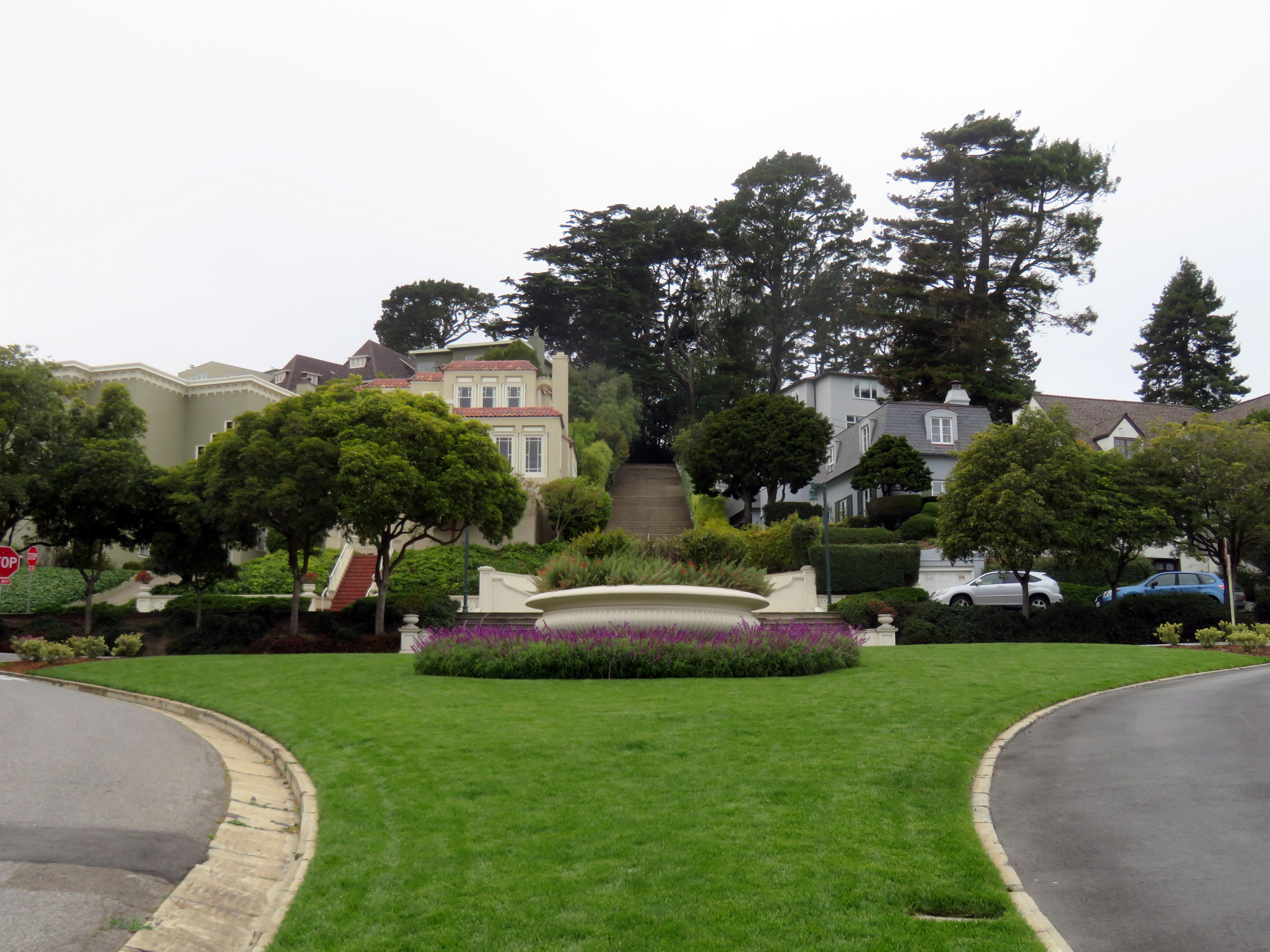
- Entrance to Forest Hill from Dewey Boulevard

- Location within Central San Francisco
- Coordinates: 37.748°N 122.463°W

Government
  - Supervisor: Myrna Melgar
  - Assemblymember: Catherine Stefani (D)
  - State Senator: Scott Wiener (D)
  - U.S. House: Nancy Pelosi (D)

Area
  - Total: 0.93 km^{2} (0.359 sq mi)
  - Land: 0.93 km^{2} (0.359 sq mi)

Population (2021)
  - Total: 2,800
  - Density: 3,345/km^{2} (8,663/sq mi)
- ZIP Code: 94116
- Area code: Area code 415
- Website: https://foresthill-association.com/

Forest Hill is an affluent neighborhood located on the West Side of San Francisco, California. Forest Hill is one of eight master-planned residence parks in San Francisco. Forest Hill is located near the middle of the City of San Francisco, southeast of the Inner Sunset and northeast of West Portal. Boundaries are roughly Seventh Avenue/Laguna Honda Boulevard to the north and east, Taraval Street to the south, and 14th Avenue to the west.

The area south of Dewey Boulevard is known as Laguna Honda or the Forest Hill Extension. The name Laguna Honda means "deep lagoon" in Spanish and presumably refers to the Laguna Honda Reservoir at the intersection of Laguna Honda Boulevard and Clarendon Avenue.

== History ==
The property for Forest Hill was purchased by a private firm, the Newell-Murdoch Company, from the heirs of Adolph Sutro. Development of the neighborhood began in 1912. Like other "residence parks" in San Francisco, Forest Hill was intended as a racially exclusive, white-only enclave for economic elites. Advertisements emphasized the deed restrictions that disallowed apartment buildings and other multi-family homes and ownership by racial minorities. Deed restrictions were in place in Forest Hills until at least the 1930s, and the residence parks remained racially homogenous for much of the 20th century.

There are restrictions that safeguard the person of taste and refinement who seeks exclusiveness. There are no Mongols, Africans or "shack builders" allowed in Forest Hill. When a man selects a homesite in this tract it is done with the positive assurance that there will be nothing disagreeable to mar the serenity of the most fastidious.

— 1913 newspaper advertisement

The streets in Forest Hill in Forest Hill did not conform to San Francisco's standards regarding width and grade, and therefore were not initially approved nor maintained by the City until 1978. Landscape architect Mark Daniels developed the master plan for Forest Hill. Several homes and the neighborhood clubhouse were designed by California Arts and Crafts Movement architect Bernard Maybeck. Harold G. Stoner also contributed to the architecture of the area, designing several houses as part of projects for Lang Realty.

== See also ==
- List of San Francisco, California Hills
