= West Side (San Francisco) =

West Side West of Twin Peaks, Western neighborhoods, The Avenues
- Region of San Francisco
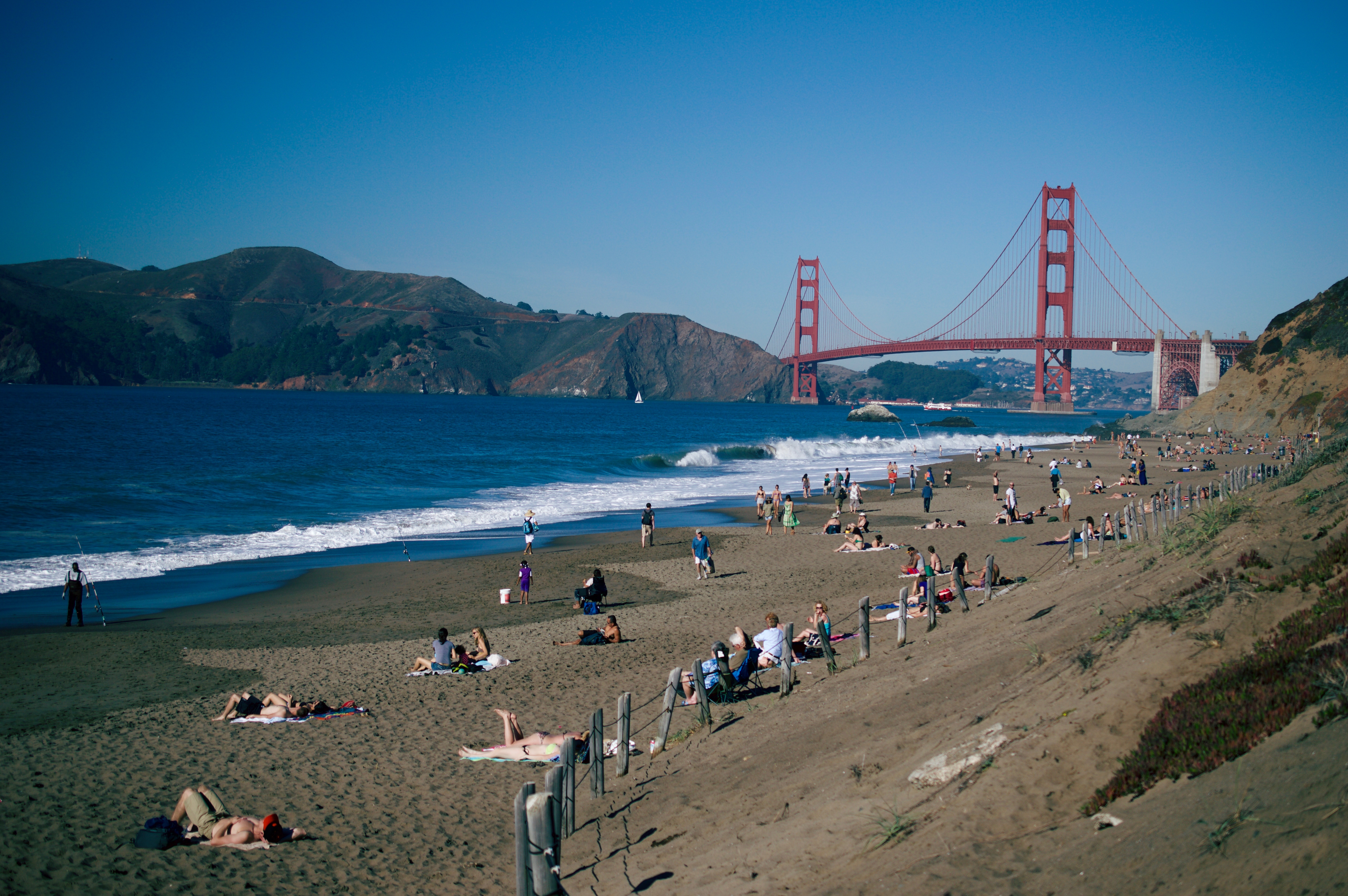
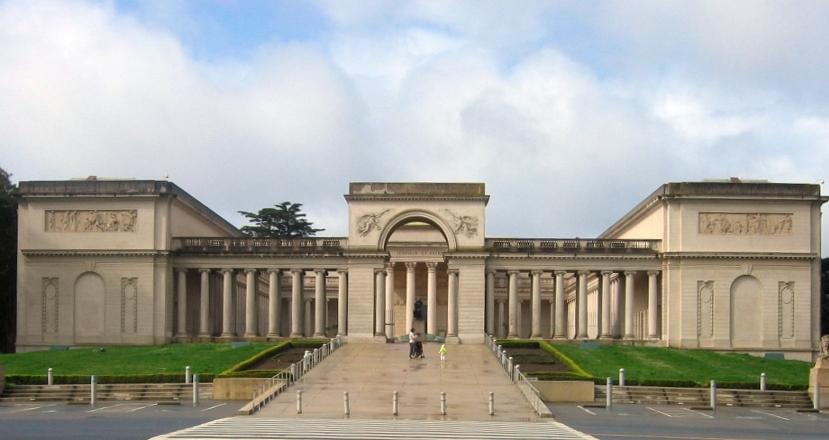
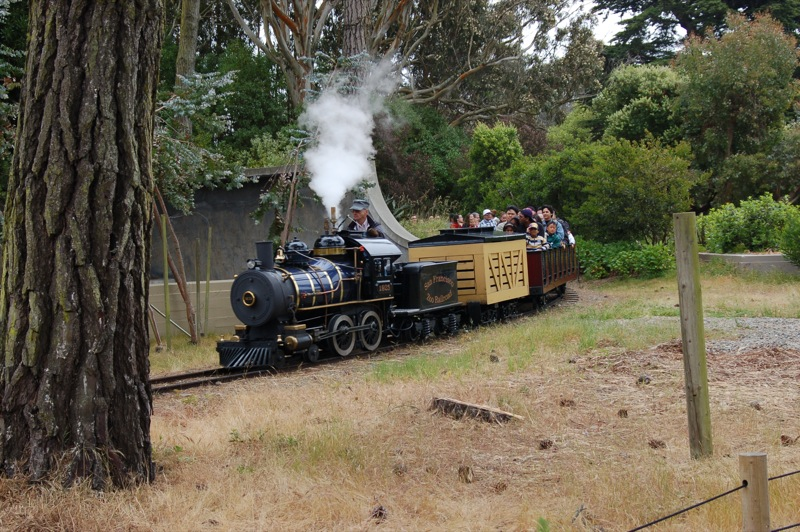
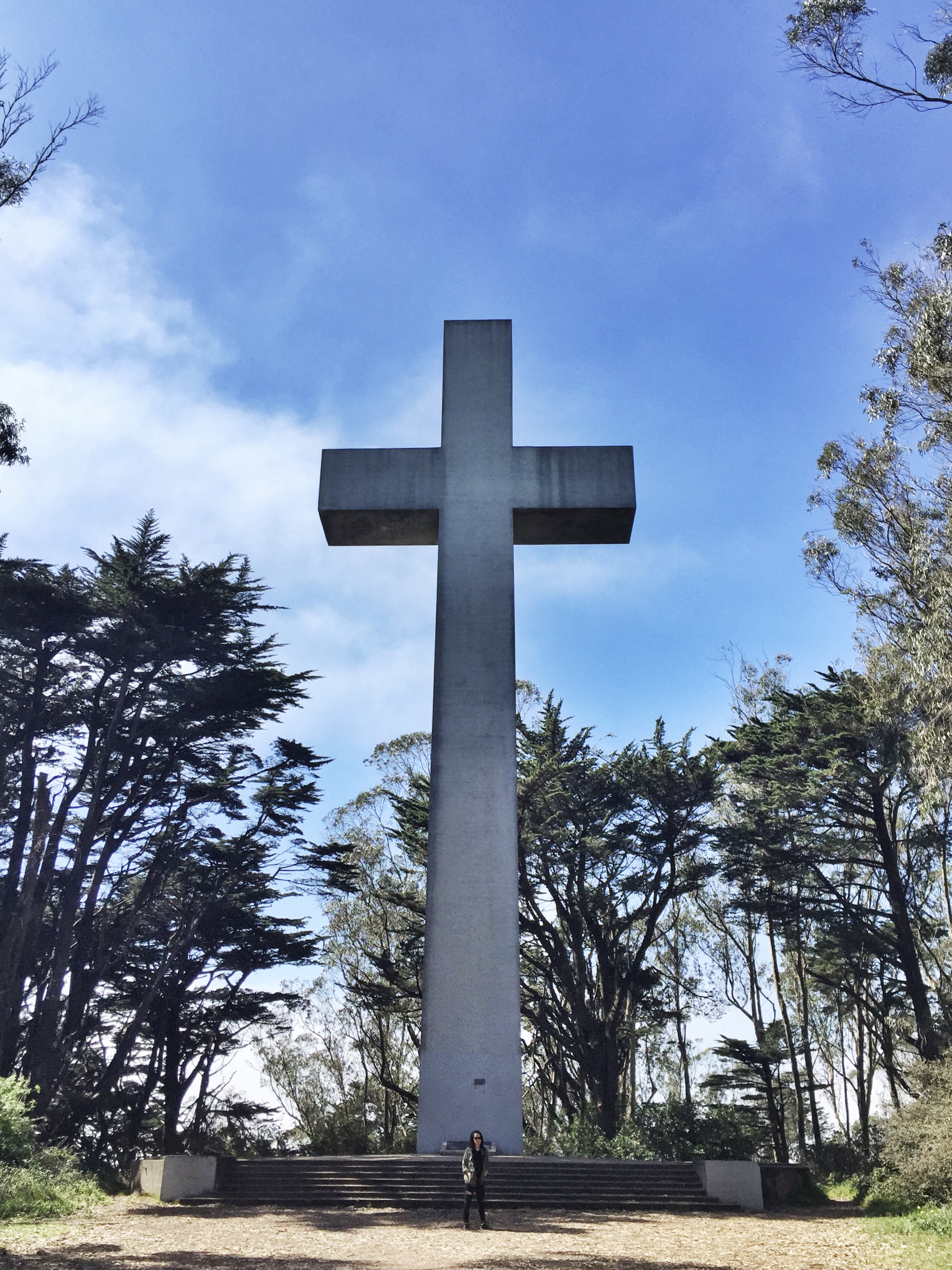
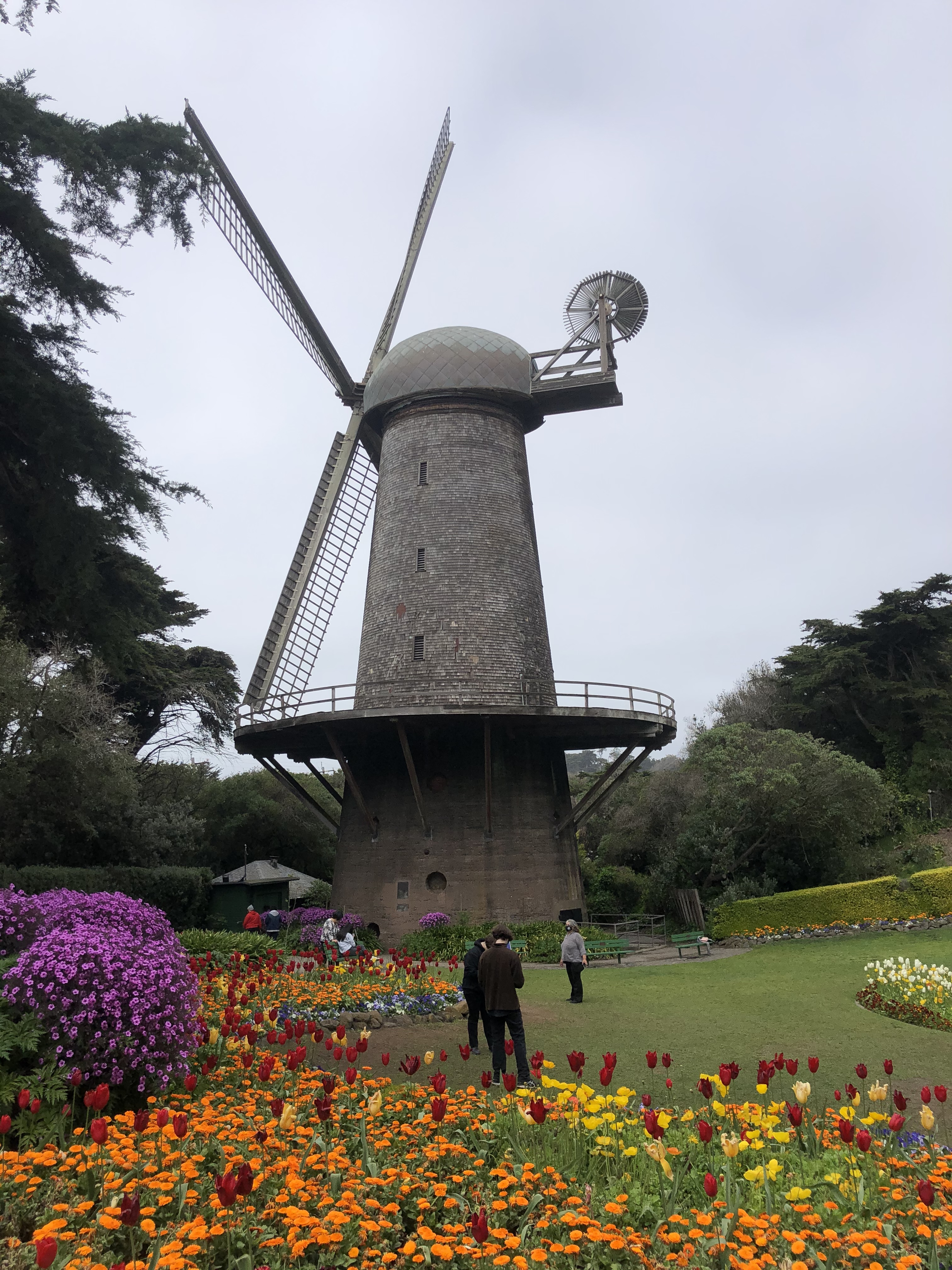
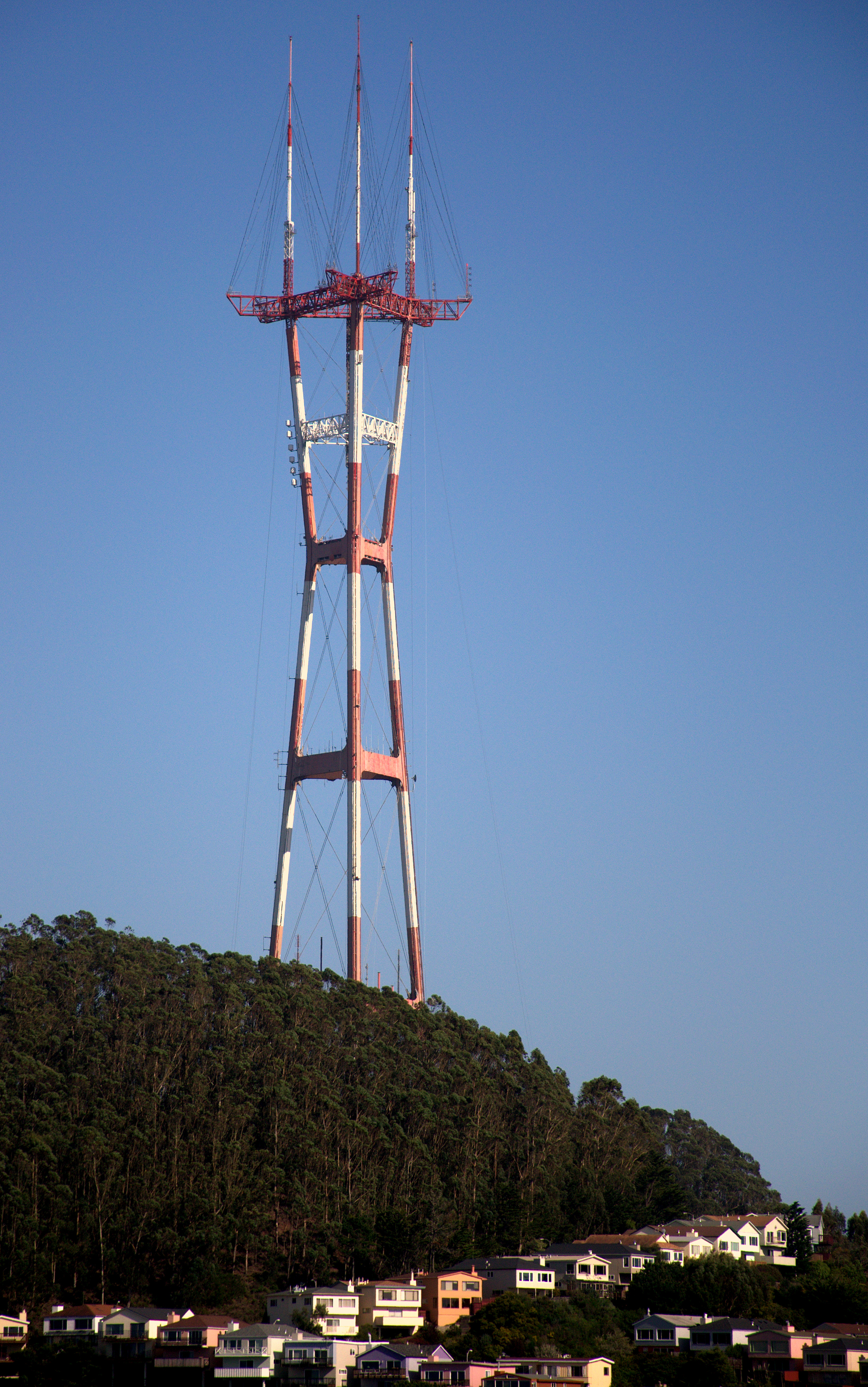
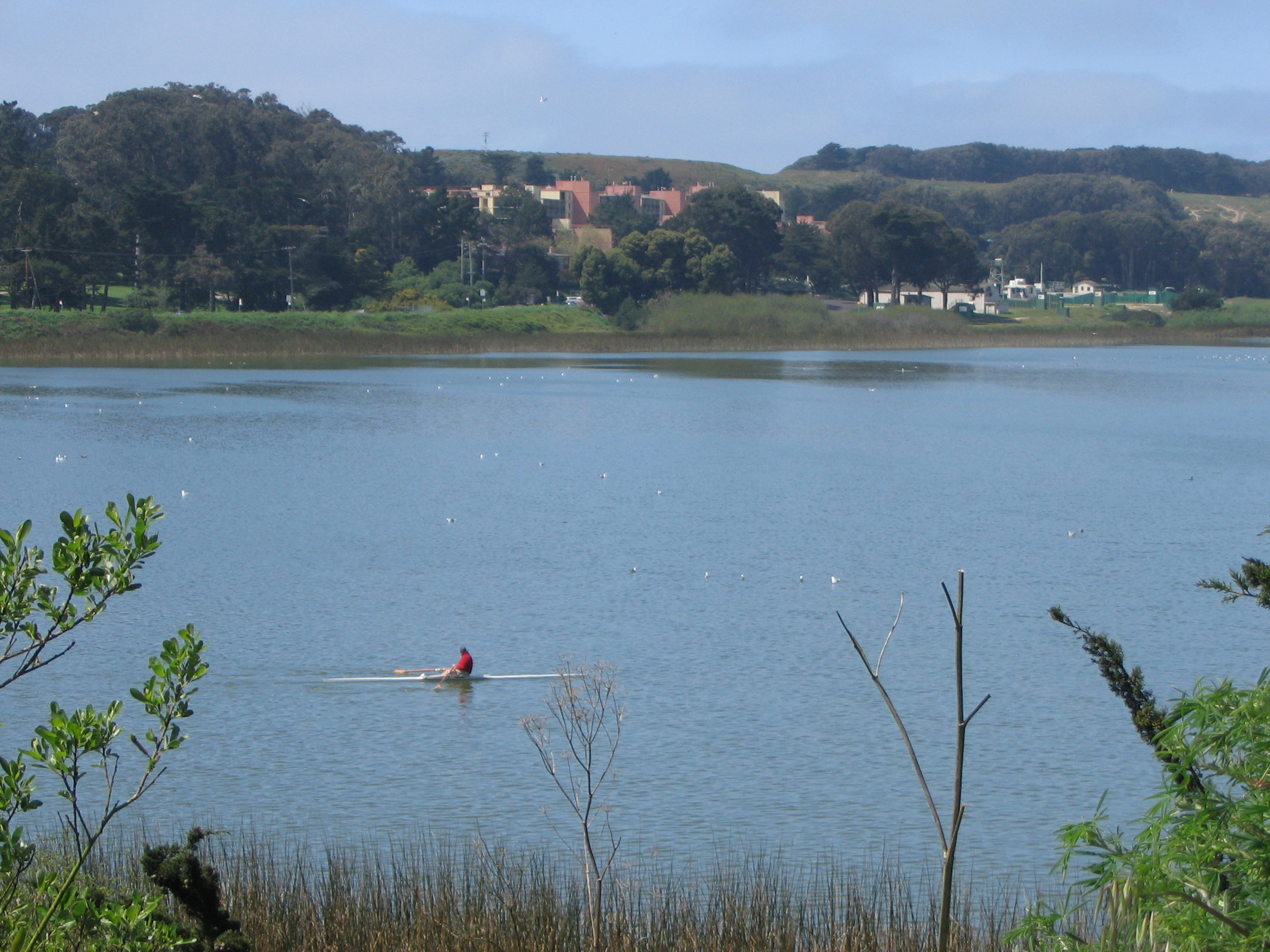
- Golden Gate Bridge seen from Baker Beach Legion of Honor San Francisco Zoo Mt. Davidson Cross Dutch Windmill Sutro Tower Lake Merced

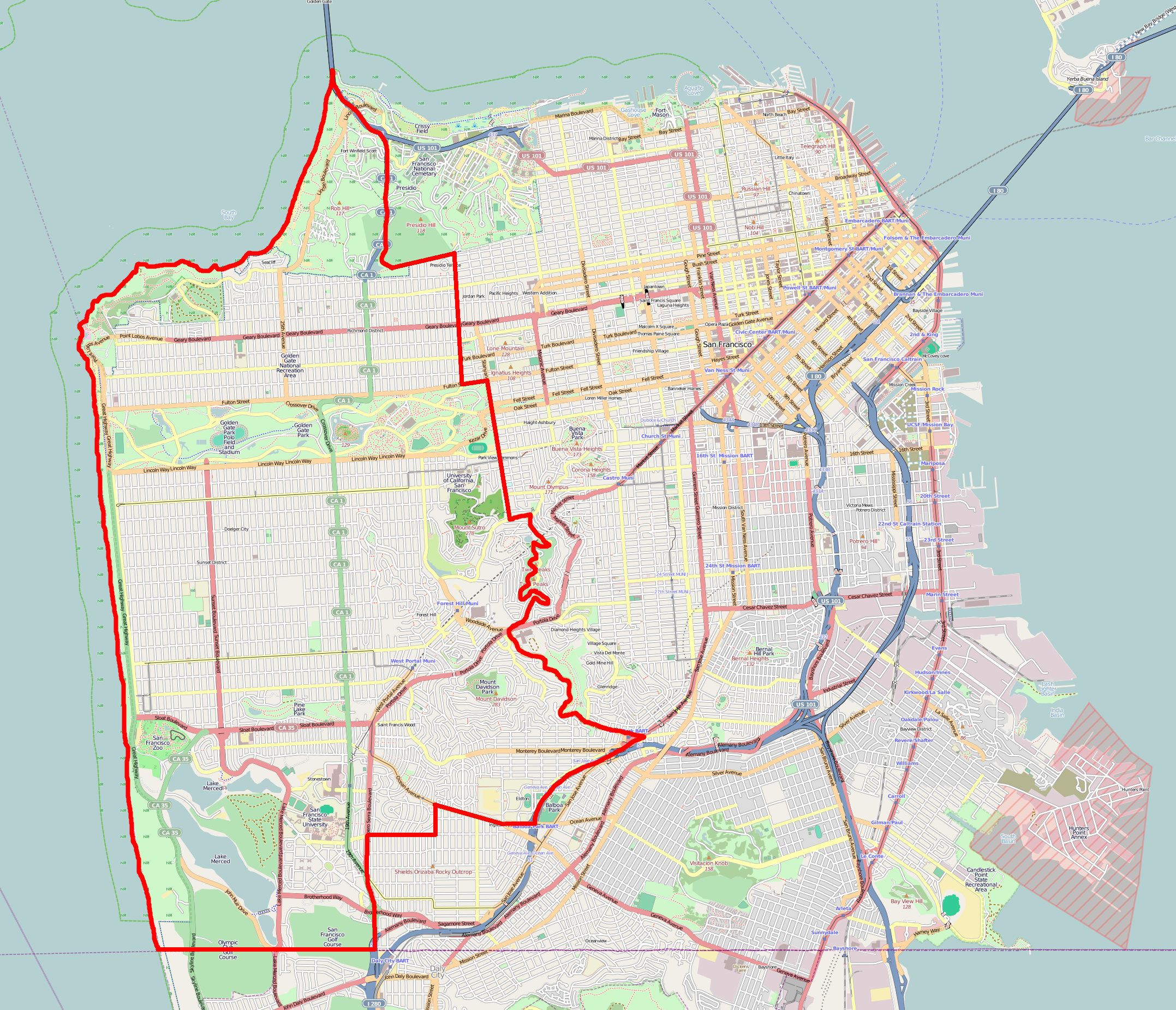
- West Side boundaries defined through a combination of district boundaries, neighborhood borders and local perceptions.
- Country: United States
- State: California
- Consolidated city-county: San Francisco

Government
  - Type: Mayor–council
  - Supervisors: Connie Chan – District 1; Alan Wong – District 4; Myrna Melgar – District 7
- Zip code: 94121, 94122, 94132, 94127, 94118
- Area codes: 415, 628

The West Side of San Francisco generally refers to a collection of neighborhoods west of the Twin Peaks.

== Location ==
The boundaries of the West Side are largely defined by neighborhood and district borders, but the prevailing perspectives of West Side residents as well as various local media outlets also help shape the region.

== History ==
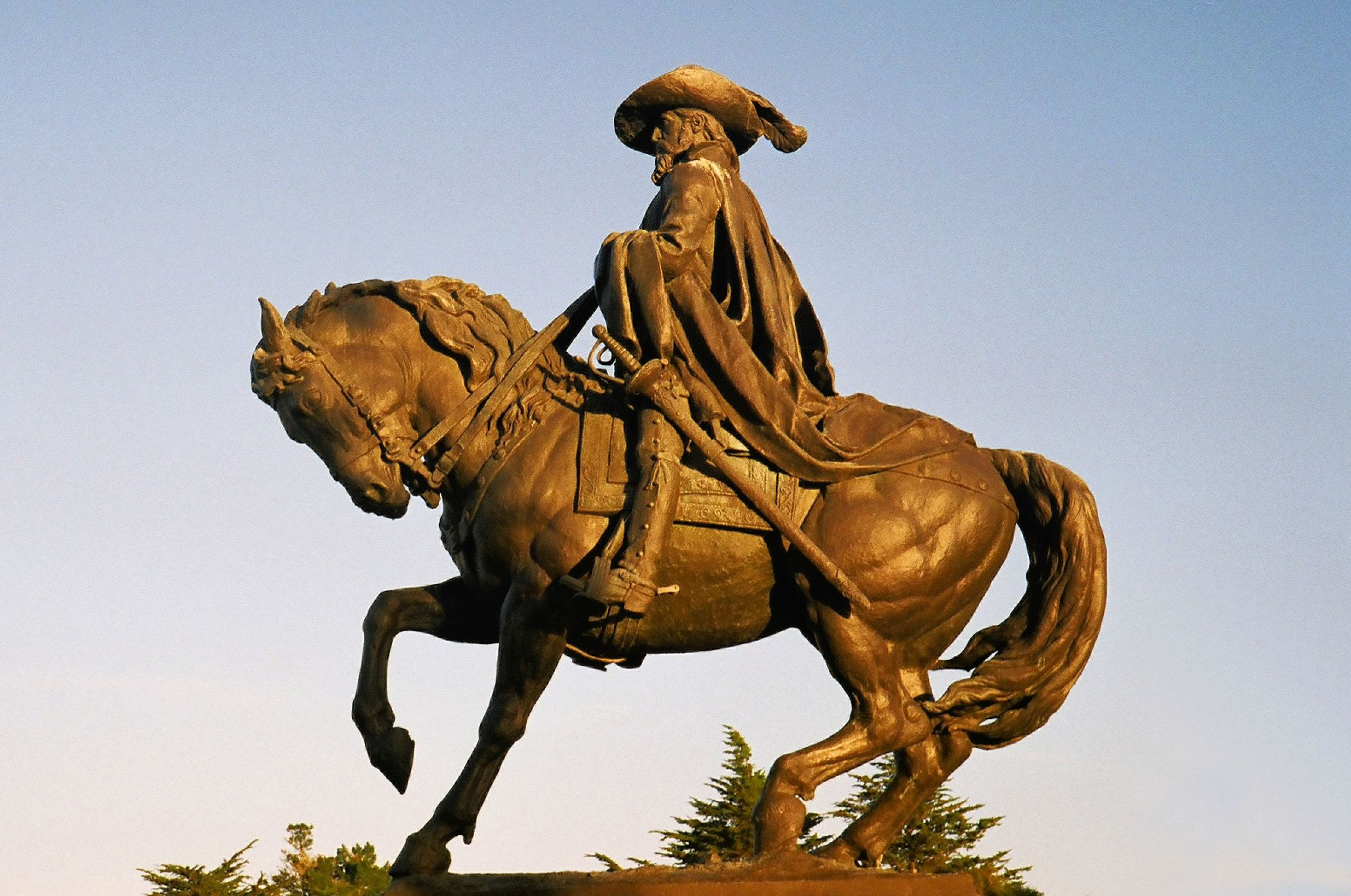
Juan Bautista de Anza, founder of the city of San Francisco

- 1776: Spanish explorer Juan Bautista de Anza establishes the Presidio of San Francisco, a military outpost, and Mission San Francisco de Asís (Mission Dolores). The western part of the city remains largely undeveloped.
- 1820s-1830s: The Mexican government secularized the missions, distributing land as ranchos to private owners. The area West of Twin Peaks became part of Rancho San Miguel, granted to José de Jesús Noé. Rancho San Miguel covered what is now Forest Hill, St. Francis Wood, Mount Davidson, and parts of the Sunset District.
- 1837: Rancho Laguna de la Merced was granted to José Antonio Galindo, encompassing modern-day Lake Merced and surrounding lands.
- 1846: The U.S. takes control of California during the Mexican-American War. The rancho lands were eventually sold and subdivided.
- 1859: The Terry-Broderick Duel takes place near Lake Merced, where U.S. Senator David C. Broderick is fatally shot by former California Supreme Court Chief Justice David S. Terry.
- 1863: Adolph Sutro purchases large portions of Rancho San Miguel, eventually developing Mount Sutro and surrounding areas.
- 1870s-1880s: The construction of Golden Gate Park begins under William Hammond Hall, transforming sand dunes into a lush urban park.
- 1895: The Ingleside Racetrack opens, becoming a popular horse racing venue in the early 20th century.
- 1902: Adolph Sutro develops Mount Sutro into a forested landscape, planting thousands of eucalyptus trees.
- 1909: The Olympic Club opens its Lake Merced clubhouse. Golf course opens officially in 1922.
- 1910s: The Sunset and Richmond Districts begin to slowly develop. The neighborhoods are marketed as affordable housing for middle-class residents.
- 1913: Sea Cliff neighborhood begins to be developed as an exclusive oceanfront community.
- 1915: San Francisco Golf Club, a private golf and social club opens at Lake Merced.
- 1918: The Twin Peaks Tunnel is completed, linking downtown to the Western neighborhoods and accelerating development in Forest Hill, St. Francis Wood, and West Portal.
- 1923: The Ingleside Racetrack closes, and the land is later used for the residential development Ingleside Terraces.
- 1924: St. Francis Wood is developed as an upscale, master-planned community.
- 1924: The California Palace of the Legion of Honor opened in Lincoln Park, modeled after the French Palais de la Légion d'Honneur in Paris. It was a gift to the city from Alma de Bretteville Spreckels.
- 1925: Harding Park municipal golf course opens at Lake Merced.
- 1927: The San Francisco Zoo (originally called the Herbert Fleishhacker Zoo) opens at the western edge of the city near Ocean Beach.
- 1928: Playland at the Beach amusement park opens near Ocean Beach, becoming major attraction.
- 1937: The Golden Gate Bridge is constructed, connecting the Presidio to Marin County.
- 1934: Mount Davidson Cross is constructed, replacing prior 1928 wooden cross.
- 1940s: Large numbers of Irish Americans move into the Sunset and Richmond Districts, shifting from previous strongholds in the Mission District and South of Market.
- 1940s: During the 1940s, San Francisco completed the large scale removal of cemeteries in the Richmond District and Lincoln Park. Thousands of bodies were exhumed and moved to Colma, while most headstones were discarded or reused as rubble or seawalls. The former burial grounds were then redeveloped into housing, leaving little visible evidence of their earlier use.
- 1950s: Following World War II, a wave of Russian and Eastern European immigrants settle in the Richmond District.
- 1952: Stonestown Galleria opens, one of San Francisco's first major suburban shopping centers, designed to serve the growing residential communities in the Sunset and Lake Merced areas.
- 1954: San Francisco State College (later San Francisco State University) relocates near Lake Merced, fueling further suburbanization.
- 1965: Passage of the Immigration and Nationality Act leads to a significant increase in Chinese immigration, with many families moving into the Richmond and Sunset Districts in the following decades, transforming these neighborhoods into major hubs of San Francisco's Chinese-American community.
- 1972: Playland at the Beach closed after decades of operation, making way for residential development.
- 1973: Sutro Tower is constructed near Mount Sutro, becoming the city's main broadcasting antenna and a recognizable landmark.
- 1990s: A majority of West Side neighborhoods become majority or near-majority Asian, primarily Chinese-American.

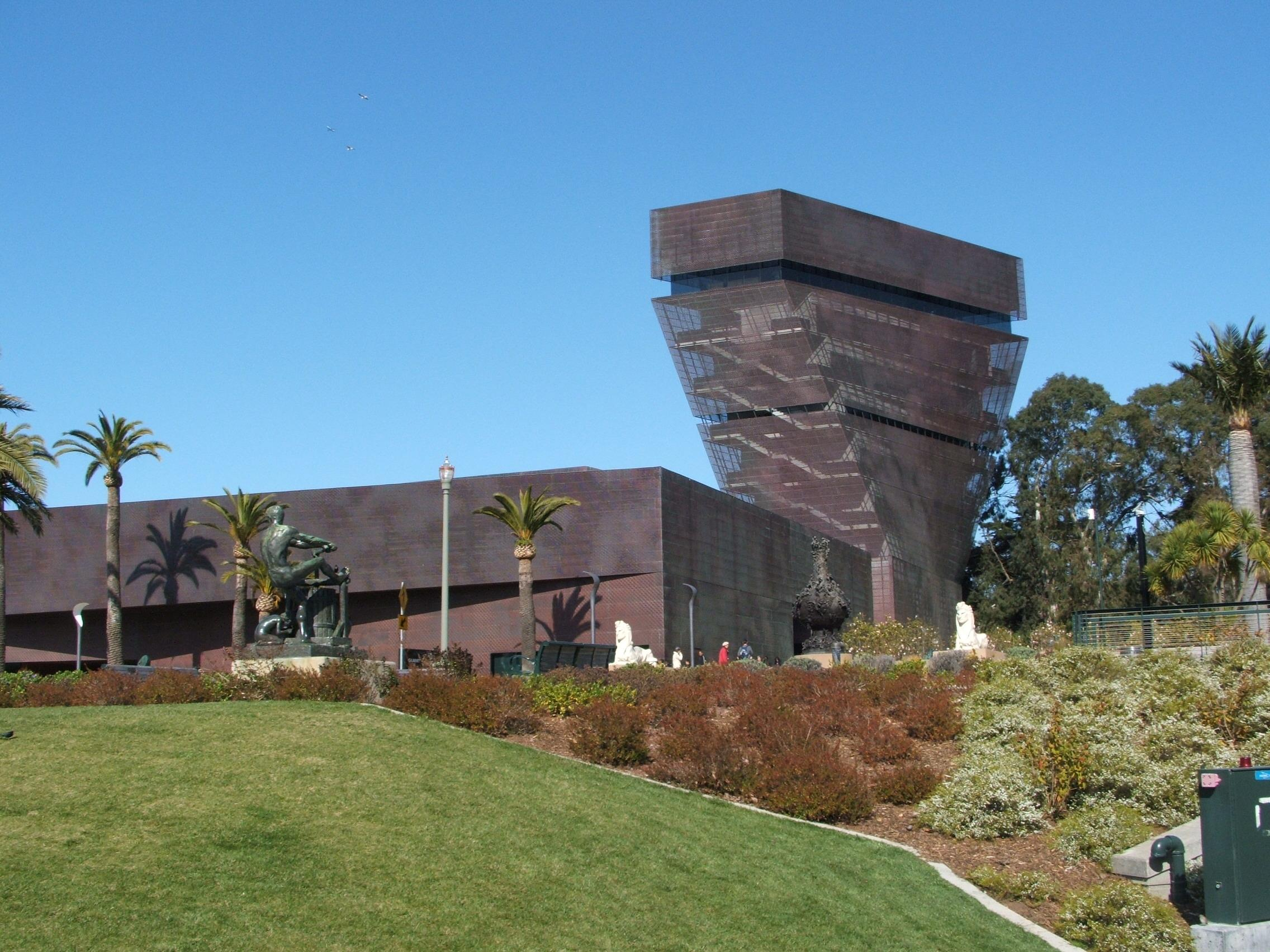
The de Young Museum

- 2005: The de Young Museum reopens after being completely reconstructed following damage from the 1989 Loma Prieta Earthquake. The new museum, designed by Herzog & de Meuron, features a modern copper-clad structure with a 144-foot observation tower.
- 2008: The California Academy of Sciences reopens after a complete reconstruction, due to earthquake damage.
- 2020: A group of vandals toppled and defaced several statues in Golden Gate Park including monuments to Francis Scott Key, Ulysses S. Grant and Junípero Serra. The bronze bust of Miguel de Cervantes, along with the adjacent sculptures of German poets (Goethe and Schiller), were also vandalized with red paint. Following the incident the Catholic Archbishop of San Francisco, Salvatore Cordileone, publicly condemned the toppling of the Serra statue as "blasphemy and sacrilege" and admonished local prosecutors for not bringing hate crime charges. All affected monuments were removed from public display and have remained in city storage.
- 2024: Voters narrowly approved Measure K, which permanently closed the Great Highway to cars and renamed it Sunset Dunes. Some residents of the Sunset and Richmond districts strongly opposed the measure, creating significant backlash. In 2025, District 4 Supervisor Joel Engardio, who helped draft the measure, was successfully recalled, and legal challenges to the roadway closure continue.

== Demographics ==
By the turn of the century, most neighborhoods on the West Side consisted mainly of white working class families of Irish descent. Many Irish families moved westward from South of Market and the Mission District, seeking quieter, suburban-style communities. Catholic parishes and schools, such as St. Ignatius College Preparatory and St. Anne of the Sunset, became cultural anchors for the Irish community.

After World War II, rapid suburbanization was followed by a wave of immigrants of mostly Russian and Eastern European heritage that settled in the Richmond District. The passing of the Immigration and Nationality Act of 1965 spurred a wave of Chinese immigration that settled predominantly in the Sunset District. From the 1980s onward, Chinese immigration transformed the West Side making Asian Americans the largest demographic in many West Side neighborhoods. Both middle class and affluent neighborhoods on the West Side are roughly split equally between White and Asian populations.

By the late 1990s traditional Irish pubs and businesses gave way to Chinese restaurants, bakeries, and markets, while Catholic schools saw increasing enrollment from Chinese families. While remnants of the old Irish and Russian communities remain—such as the United Irish Cultural Center and the Russian Orthodox Holy Virgin Cathedral—the cultural and commercial landscape has largely transformed, reflecting the dominance of Chinese businesses, schools, and community institutions.

== Commerce ==
Though often perceived as a quieter, more residential part of San Francisco, the West Side has several commercial corridors. In the Richmond District there are many Asian food establishments with an emphasis on dim sum which is some of the best in the city. The Sunset District also has many Asian food options in addition to dozens of Irish pubs with The Little Shamrock claiming to be the second oldest bar in the city, being established in 1893. West Portal has American and Italian restaurants. The Parkside, situated along Taraval street is dotted with Irish pubs, dive bars and Asian restaurants.

== Politics ==
Unlike much of the East side of the city, many West Side residents hold mostly moderate political views, often voting against anti-car legislation and opposing bicycle infrastructure projects. Additionally West Side residents are strongly opposed to high density housing development in any of their neighborhoods and seek to maintain the quiet and suburban atmosphere that characterizes the area. This resistance to downtown YIMBY political pressure has caused tension and a deep divide among City residents who seek to balance local community control and housing goals.

In 2024, voters narrowly approved Proposition K, which permanently closed the Great Highway (a popular West Side connector route) to vehicle traffic. The measure revealed a sharp political divide, with Western neighborhoods overwhelmingly opposed to it, while support came largely from the east side of the city. Controversy deepened due to the fact the measure was introduced by a Supervisor (Joel Engardio) who represents the West Side. This prompted criticism from his local constituents who viewed the move as an open betrayal and subsequently launched a recall effort.

In 2025, a lawsuit was filed challenging the highway closure, arguing that it conflicted with state traffic laws and bypassed environmental review requirements.

== Parks ==
- Golden Gate Park
- Lake Merced
- Lands End
- Lincoln Park
- Mount Davidson
- Ocean Beach
- Pine Lake Park
- The Presidio
- Sigmund Stern Grove
- Sunset Dunes
- Sutro Heights Park
- Twin Peaks
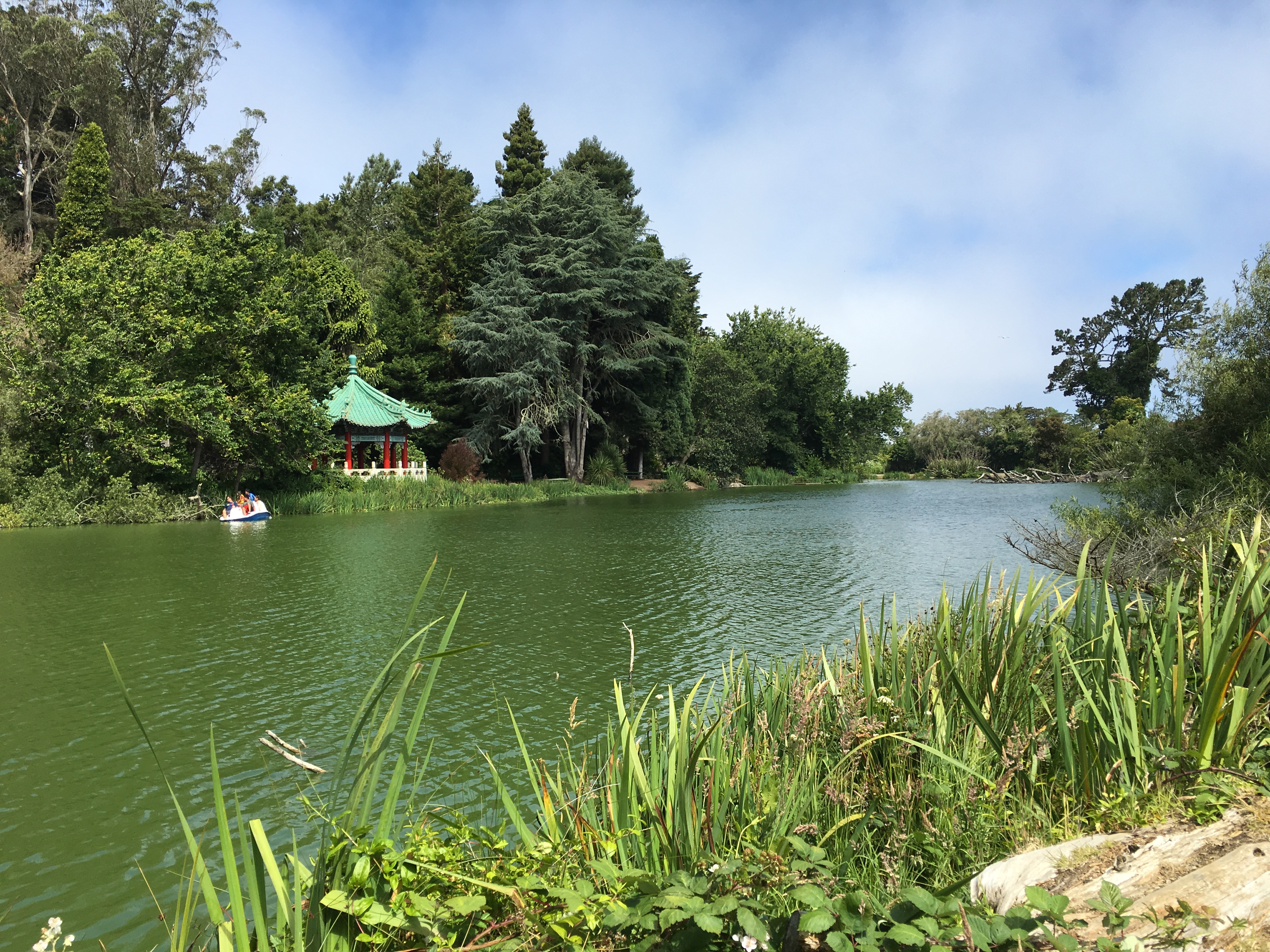
Chinese pagoda at Blue Heron Lake in Golden Gate Park

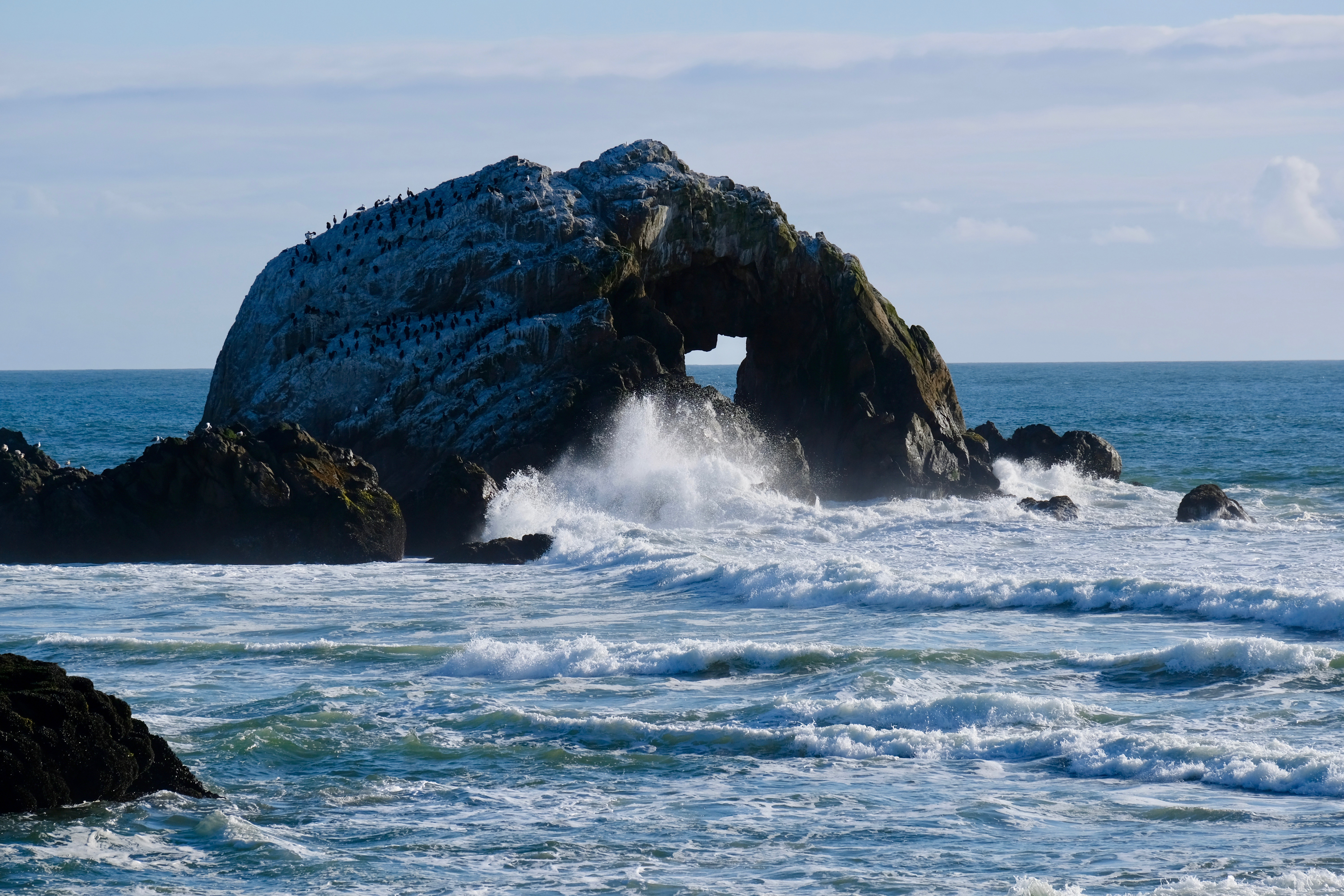
Seal Rock located by the Cliff House at Sutro Heights

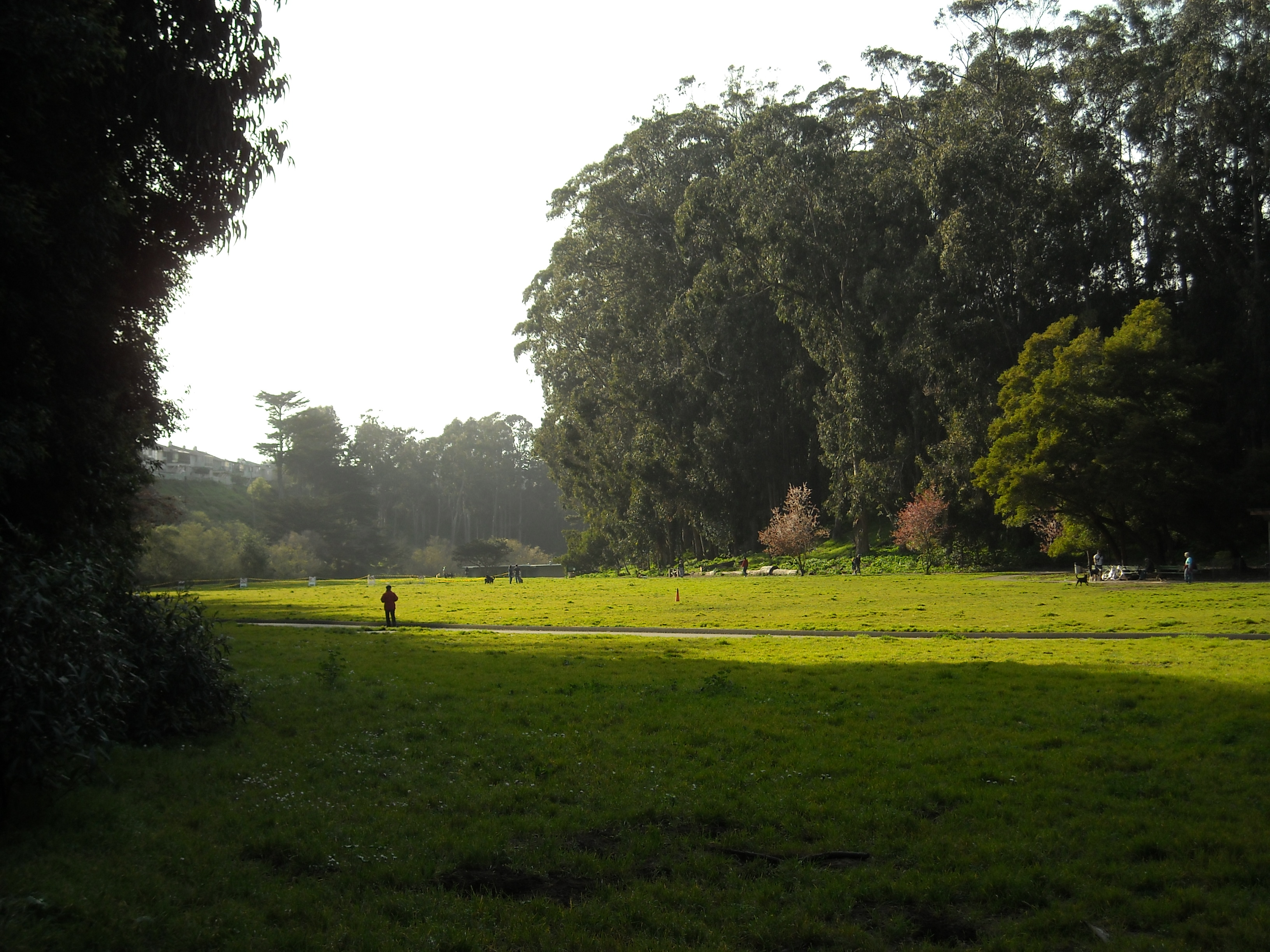
Pine Lake Park

== Neighborhoods ==
The West Side comprises various neighborhoods and contains several of San Francisco's residence parks.

- Balboa Terrace
- Forrest Hill
- Forest Hill Extension
- Forest Knolls
- Golden Gate Heights
- Ingleside Terraces
- Lakeshore
- Lakeside
- Lincoln Manor
- Merced Manor
- Midtown Terrace
- Miraloma Park
- Monterey Heights
- Mount Davidson Manor
- Parkside
- Parkmerced
- Presidio Terrace
- Richmond District
- Sea Cliff
- Sherwood Forest
- Stonestown
- St. Francis Wood
- Sunnyside
- Sunset District
- West Clay Park
- West Portal
- Westwood Highlands
- Westwood Park
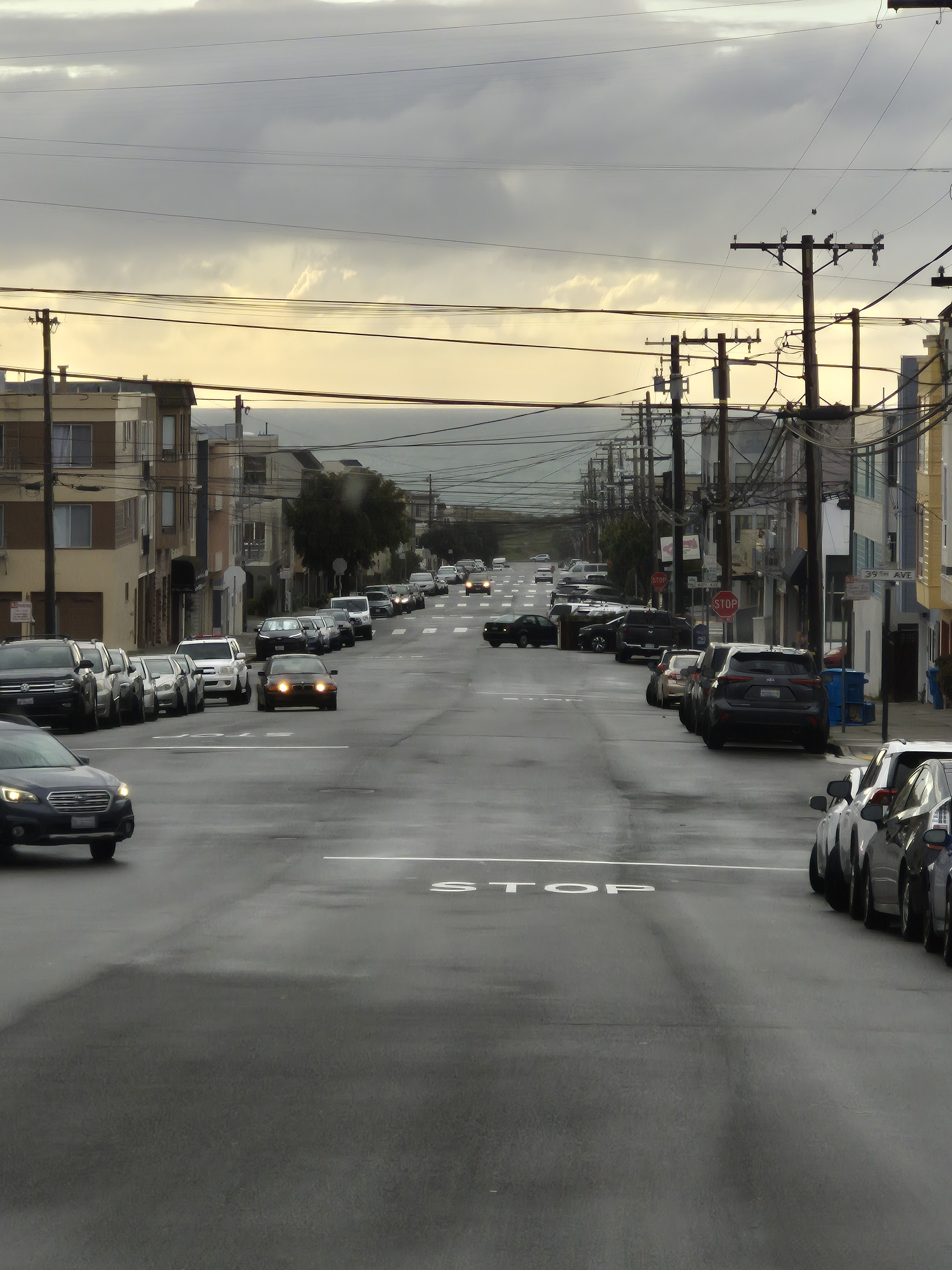
Irving Street in the Sunset District

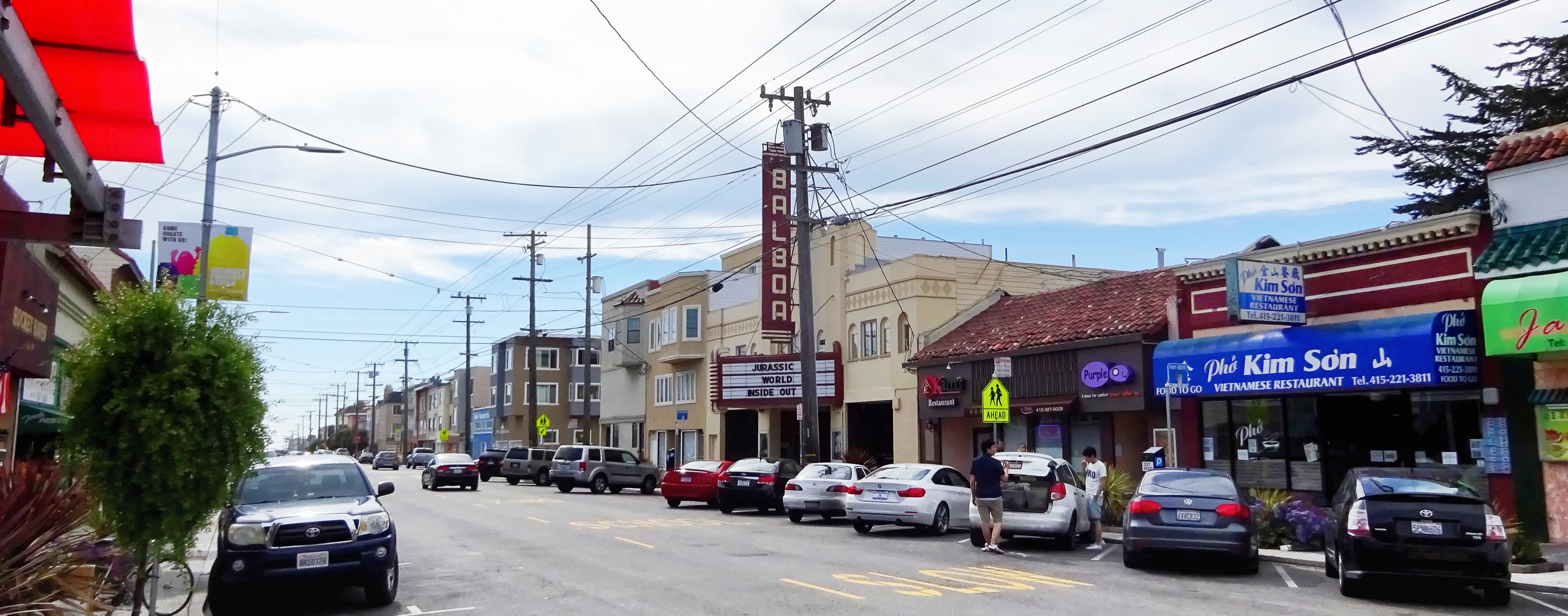
Balboa Street in the Richmond District

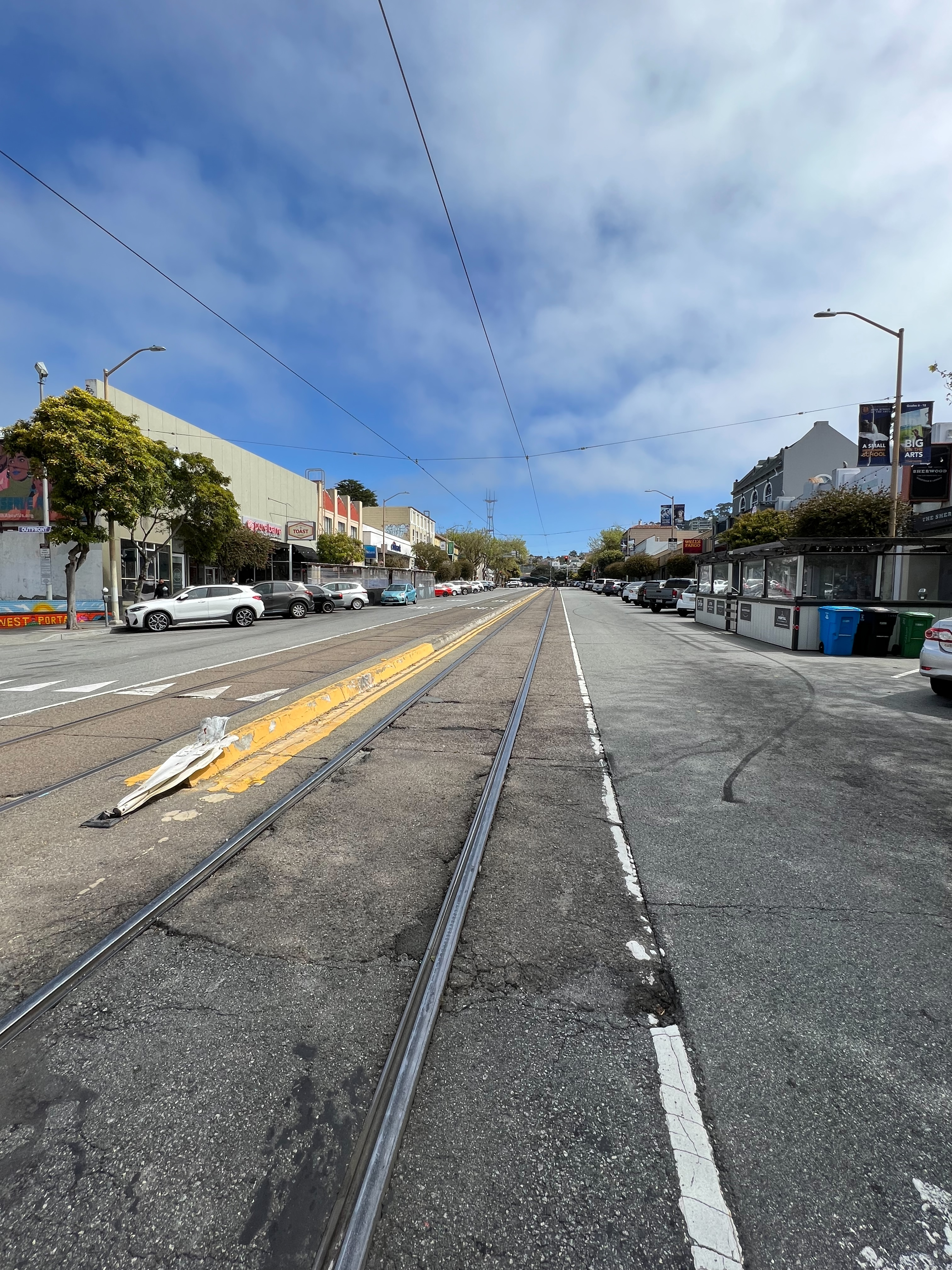
West Portal Avenue, the main commercial strip in the West Portal neighborhood

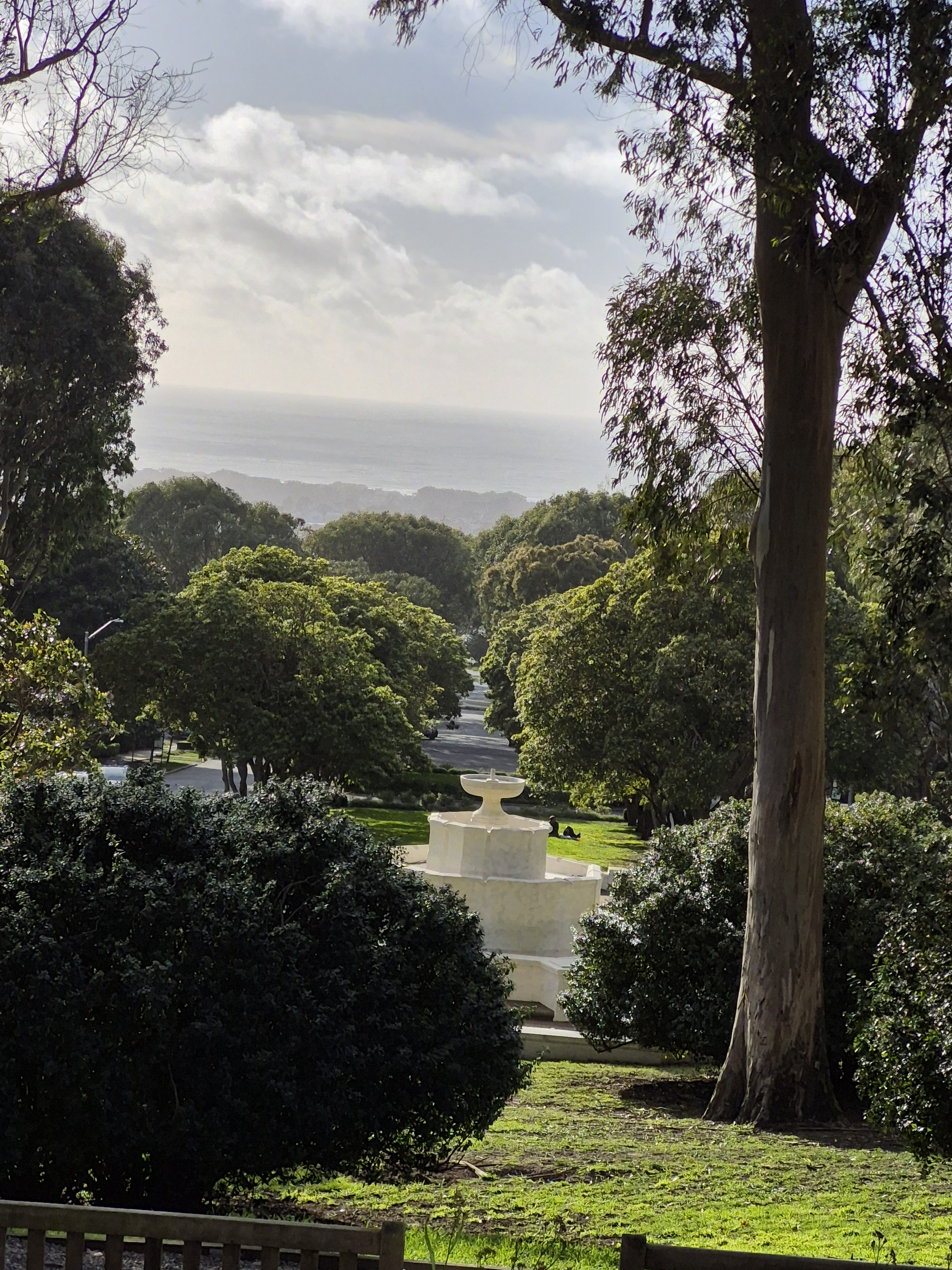
St. Francis Boulevard in St. Francis Wood

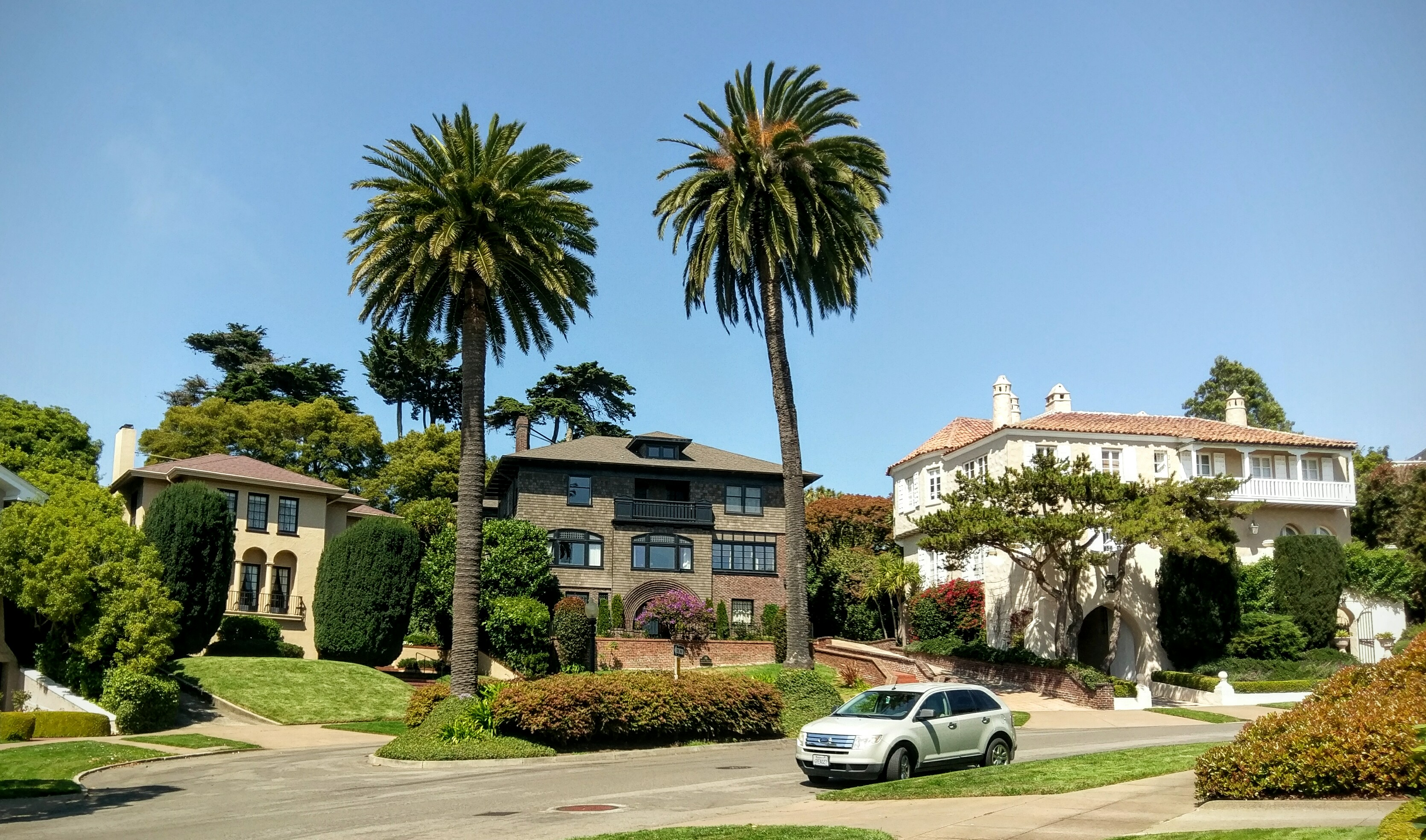
Homes in the Presidio Terrace neighborhood

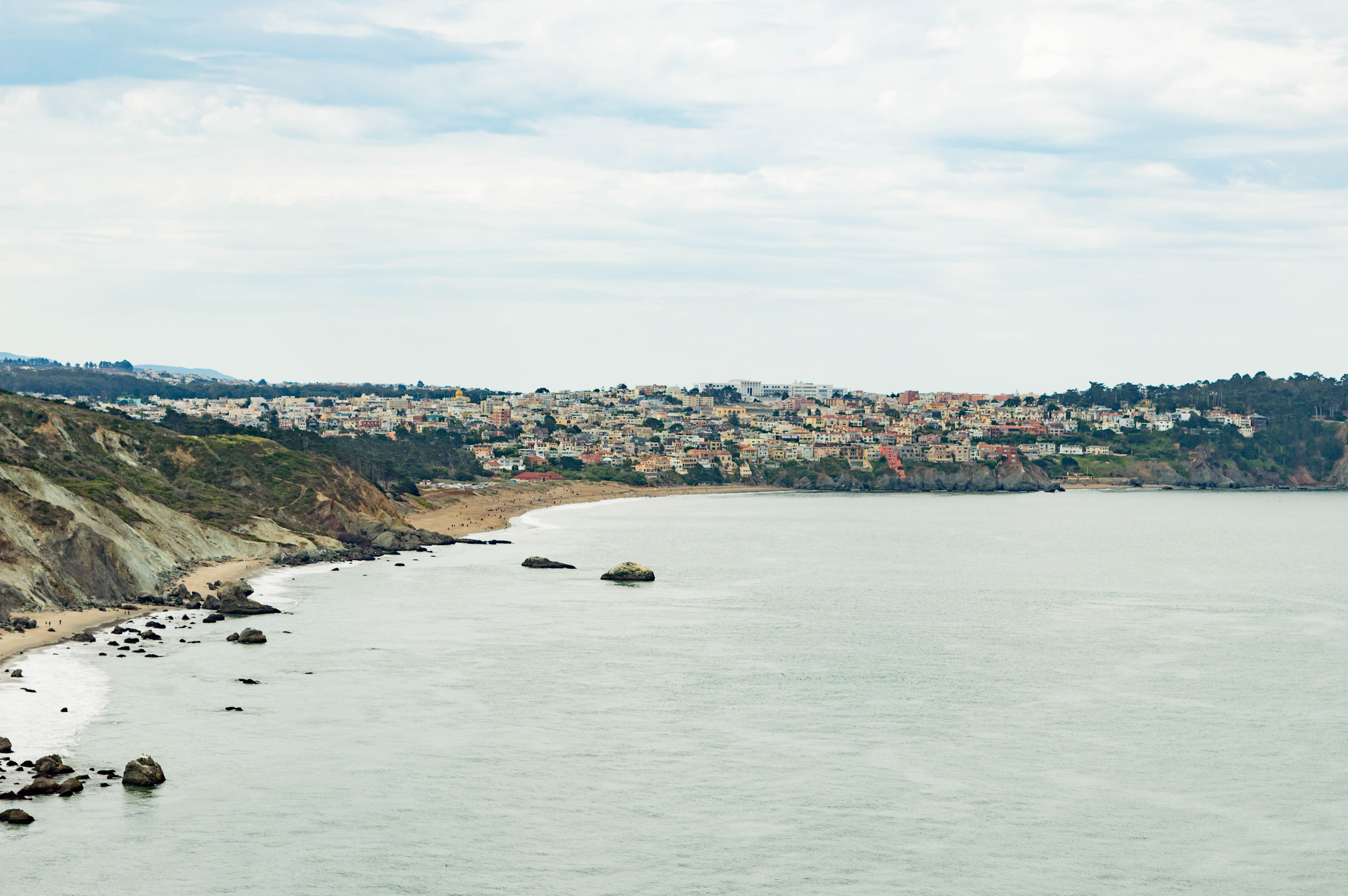
View of the Sea Cliff neighborhood from Baker Beach

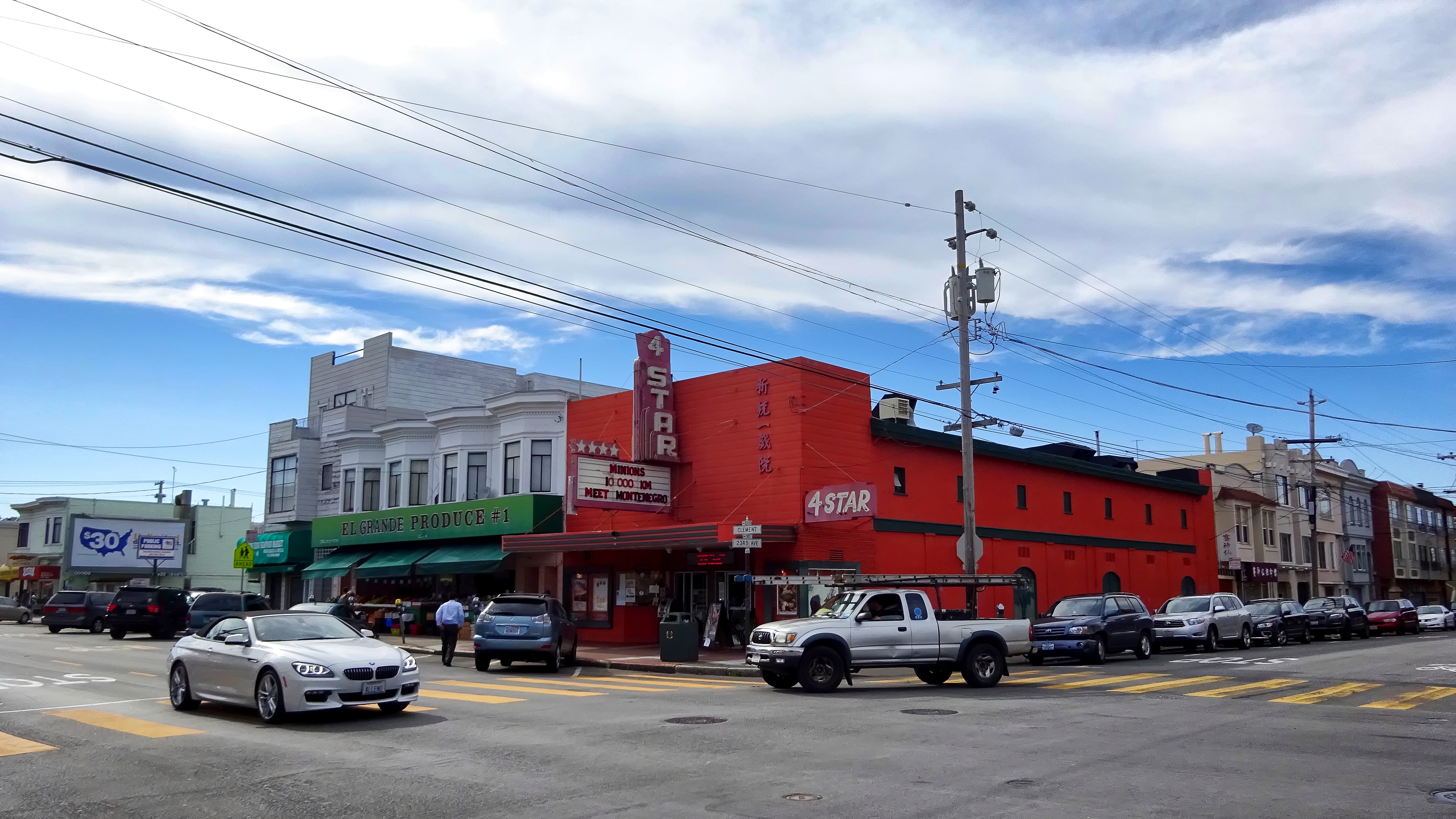
4 Star theater on Clement street
