= Balboa Terrace, San Francisco =

Balboa Terrace
- Neighborhood of San Francisco
- Location within San Francisco Location within San Francisco Location within Northern California
- Coordinates: 37.7313°N 122.4687°W
- Country: United States
- State: California
- City: San Francisco

Government
  - Supervisor: Norman Yee
  - Assemblymember: Catherine Stefani (D)
  - State Senator: Scott Wiener (D)
  - U.S. House: Aisha Wahab (D)

Area
  - Total: 0.092 sq mi (0.24 km^{2})
  - Land: 0.092 sq mi (0.24 km^{2})

Population (2016)
  - Total: 839
  - Density: 9,100/sq mi (3,500/km^{2})
- Time zone: UTC-8 (Pacific Time)
  - Summer (DST): UTC-7 (Pacific Daylight Time)
- ZIP Code: 94127
- Area codes: 415/628

Balboa Terrace is a small residential neighborhood located on the West Side of San Francisco. It is bounded by Junipero Serra Boulevard, Monterey Avenue, Aptos Avenue and Ocean Avenue along the southern edge of the exclusive St. Francis Wood community.
