= Presidio Terrace =

Neighborhood in the United States

Coordinates: 37°47′18″N 122°27′38″W

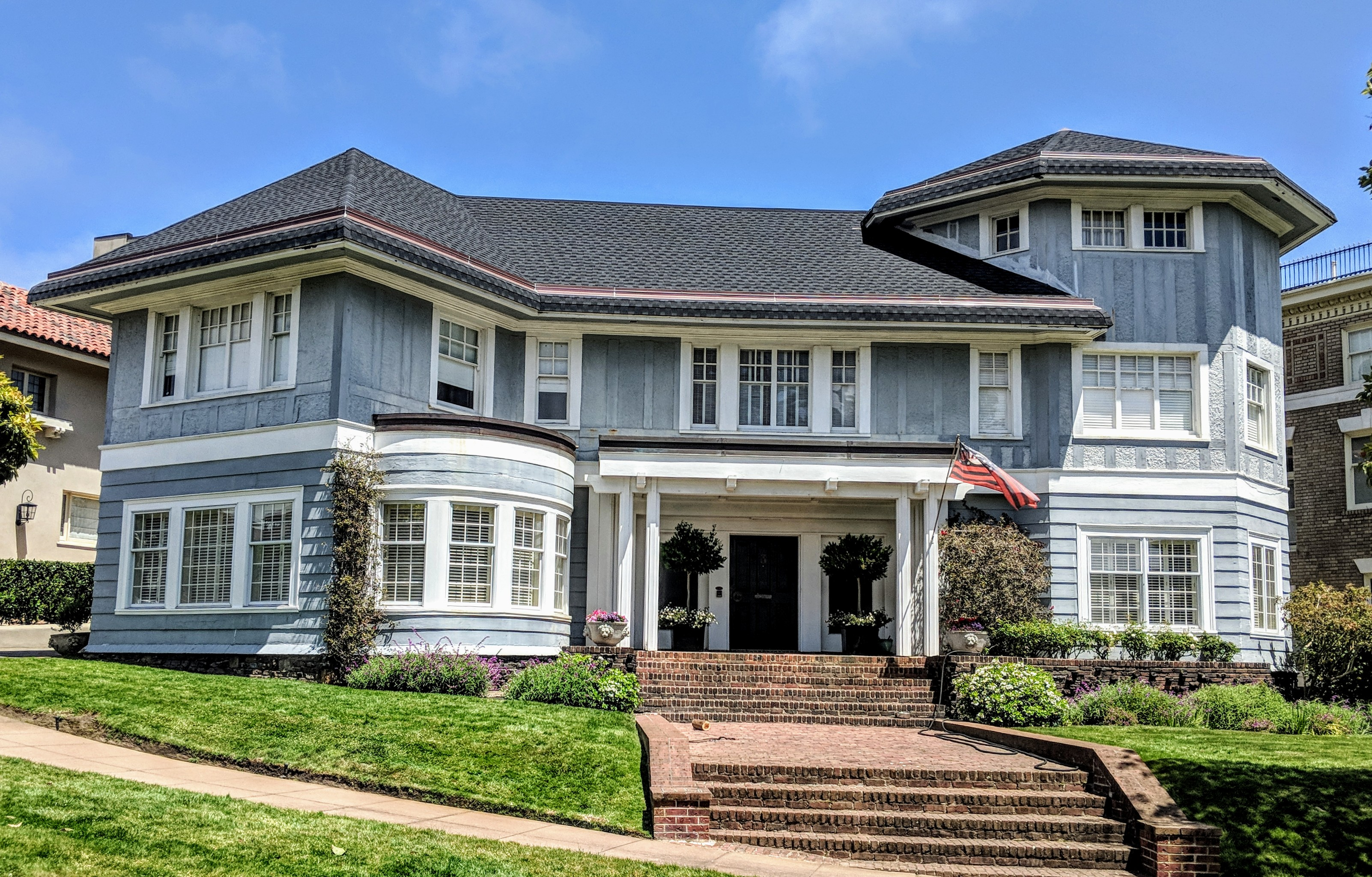
Presidio Terrace home

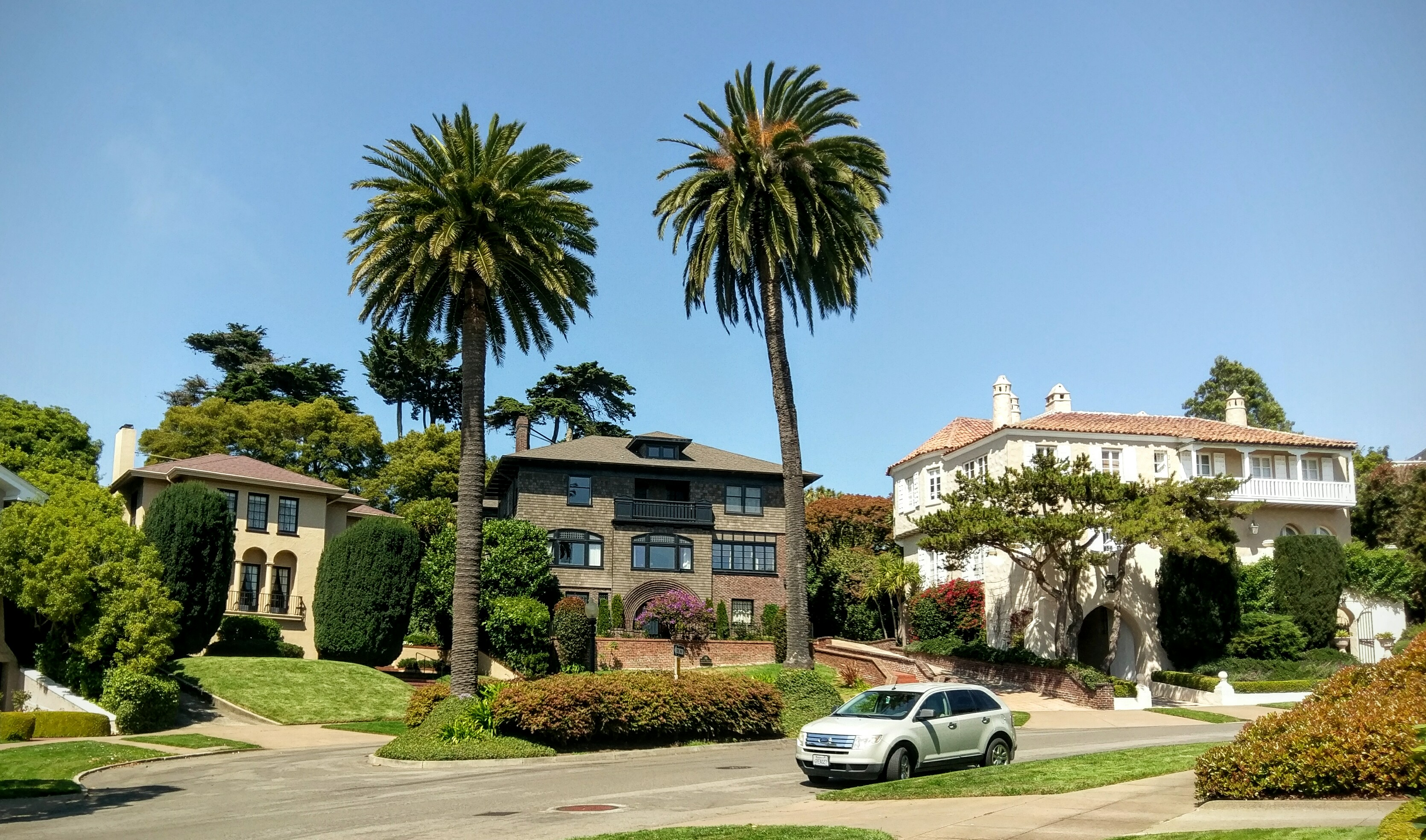
Homes on Presidio Terrace

Presidio Terrace is a small, extremely affluent gated neighborhood in San Francisco that was the first of the master-planned communities built in the West Side of the city. It consists of 36 large lots laid out around a single privately owned street, also called Presidio Terrace, which takes the form of a two-way access street leading to a one-way elliptical cul-de-sac. Access is off Arguello Boulevard.

== History ==
Construction started in 1905, just south of and adjacent to the Presidio, a former army base that is now a part of the Golden Gate National Recreation Area. Amenities unusual for residential developments of that time included electric street lights, underground utilities and roads designed for auto traffic. The neighborhood was developed by the firm of Baldwin & Howell, a leading San Francisco real estate development company. It thrived following the 1906 San Francisco earthquake as prosperous families rebuilt outside the destroyed neighborhoods in the eastern part of the city.

Presidio Terrace was originally marketed to white residents only. "There is only one spot in San Francisco where only Caucasians are permitted to buy or lease real estate or where they may reside. That place is Presidio Terrace", according to a 1906 brochure distributed by the developer. A 1948 Supreme Court case, Shelley v. Kraemer, which banned enforcement of racial covenants in housing, invalidated restrictions of this type nationwide.

In 2015, as a result of delinquent non-payment of county property taxes by the homeowners association, a San Jose couple, Tina Lam and Michael Cheng, were able to purchase the street, sidewalks and all other "common ground", including garden islands and palm trees, for $90,000. The tax bill was being sent to 47 Kearny Street and the homeowners association blamed a defunct accountant but the owner of 47 Kearny street claimed that no such arrangement existed with the homeowner's association. "Handford Freund has never managed the Presidio Homeowners Association or whatever it may be named." Worried that the new property owners would charge them for parking in the 120 parking spaces on the street, the homeowners complained to San Francisco Board of Supervisors asking that the sale be voided. In addition the British Consulate, which has owned a house on the street as a consular residence since 2003, raised security concerns. On November 28, 2017, the Board of Supervisors voted 7–4 to reverse the sale, reverting ownership to the homeowners. After the vote, Supervisor Mark Farrell referred to the couple as "bottom-feeding pirates attempting to extort and hold San Francisco residents hostage".

In April 2018, the San Francisco Chronicle reported that the municipal government had failed to bill the homeowner's association for water used for irrigation of landscaping for 113 years. In the preceding ten years, the cost of the water was $59,548, and the homeowner's association promptly paid that amount.

== Surroundings ==
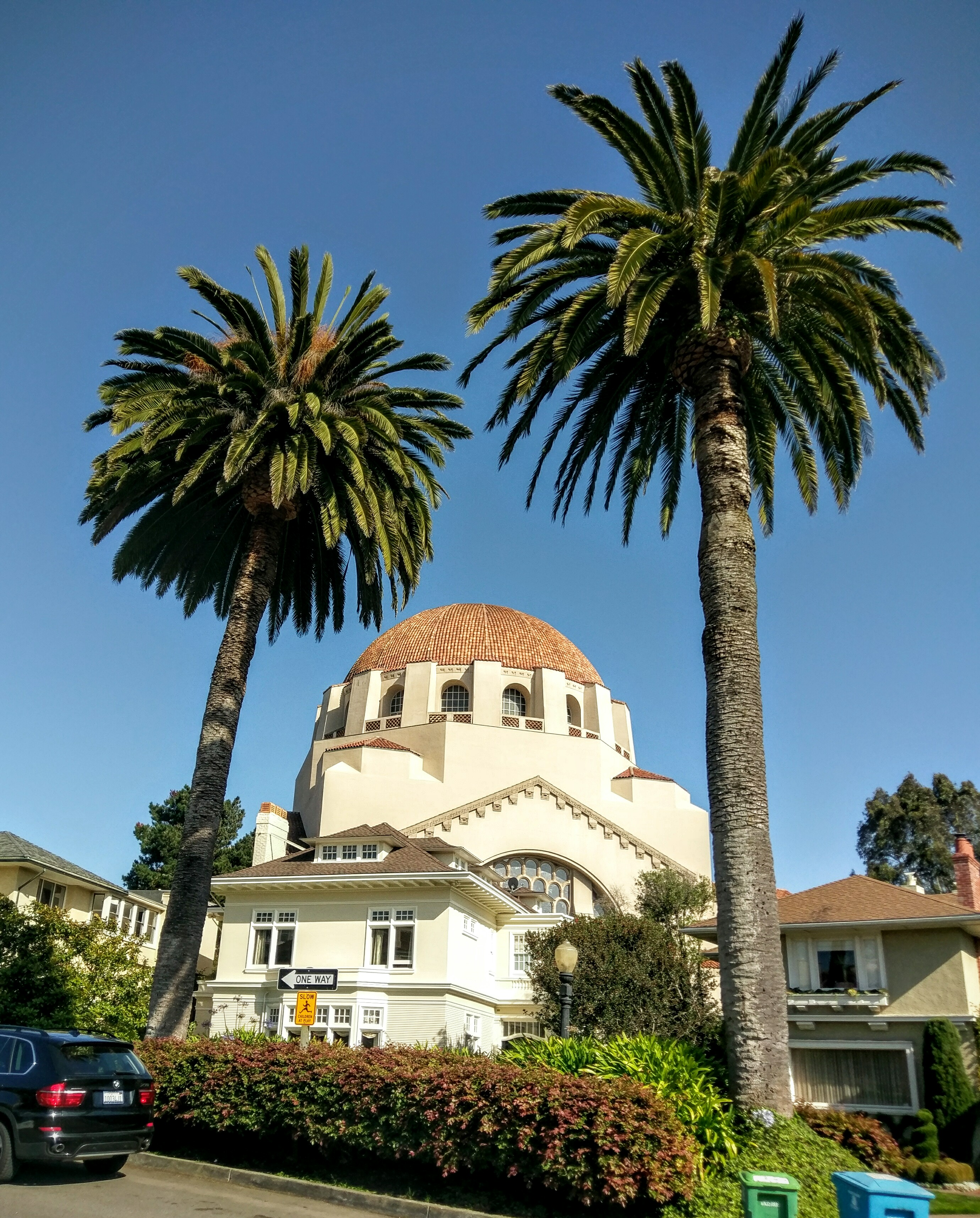
Presidio Terrace homes with Temple Emanu-El behind

Temple Emanu-El was built on an adjacent parcel on the northwest corner of Arguello Boulevard and Lake Street in 1925, and the Little Sisters of the Poor is also close by.

== Architecture ==
Architectural styles in the neighborhood include Beaux-Arts, Mission Revival, and Tudor Revival. Julia Morgan designed an Italian Renaissance villa in Presidio Terrace in 1909. A plan to modernize the architecture of one house in the 1990s aroused objections by neighbors.

== Notable residents ==
Many notable San Franciscans have lived in Presidio Terrace over the years, including San Francisco Mayor Joseph Alioto, the former Peruvian Ambassador to the United States Fernando Berckemeyer Pazos, United States Congresswoman and first female Speaker of the House Nancy Pelosi, Senator Dianne Feinstein and her husband, financier Richard C. Blum, and novelist and newspaper columnist Merla Zellerbach.
