= West Portal, San Francisco =

West Portal
- Neighborhood of San Francisco
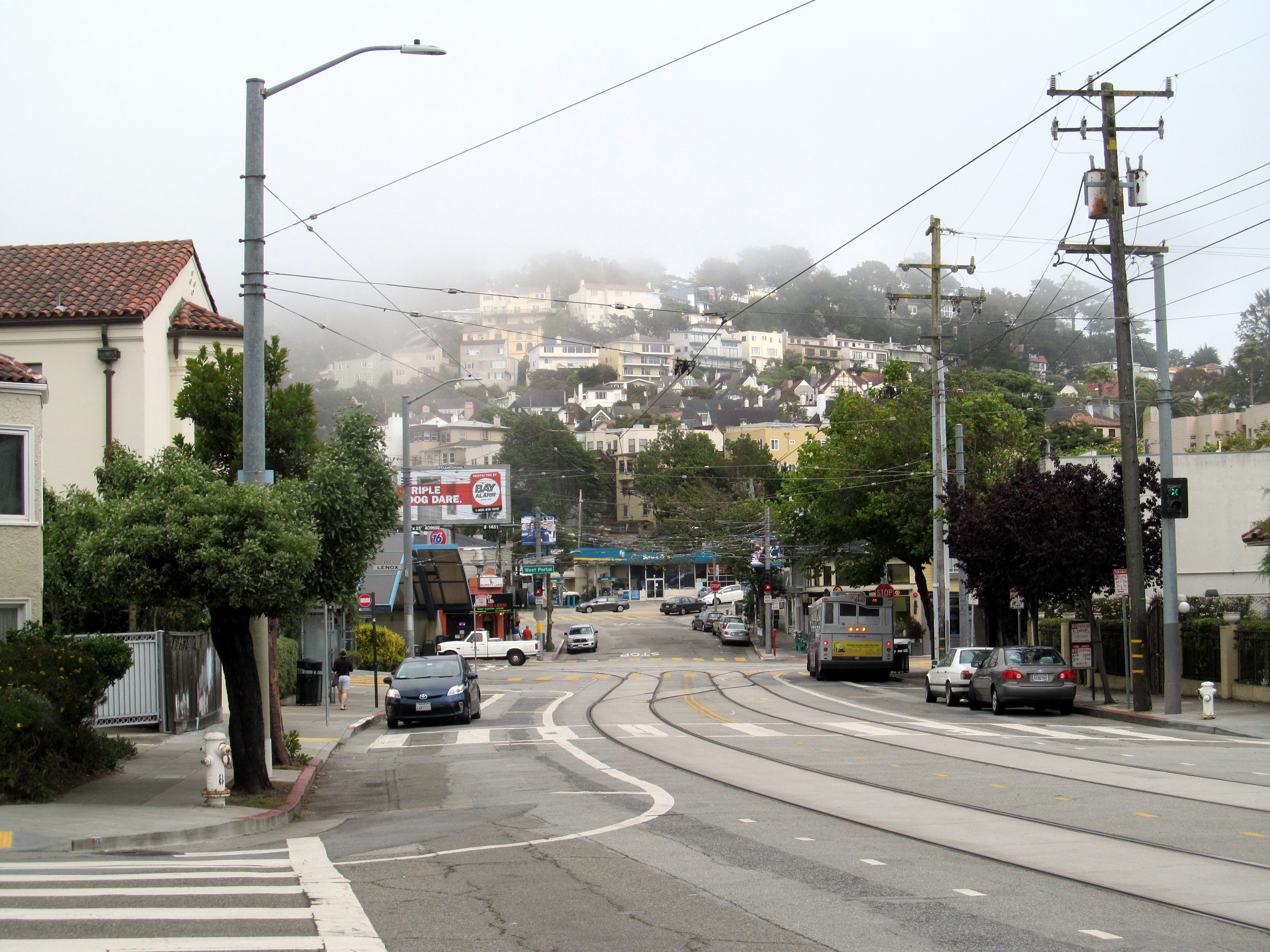
- Ulloa Street in West Portal in 2017

- Location within San Francisco
- Coordinates: 37°44′27.32″N 122°27′56.95″W

Government
  - Supervisor: Myrna Melgar
  - Assemblymember: Catherine Stefani (D)
  - State Senator: Scott Wiener (D)
  - U. S. Rep.: Nancy Pelosi (D)

Area
  - Total: 2.705 sq mi (7.01 km^{2})
  - Land: 2.705 sq mi (7.01 km^{2})

Population
  - Total: 2,630
  - Density: 9,230/sq mi (3,560/km^{2})
- ZIP Code: 94116, 94127, 94132
- Area codes: 415/628

West Portal is a small neighborhood located on the West Side of San Francisco, California. West Portal is a primarily residential area of the city. The neighborhood's main corridor, West Portal Avenue, serves as a principal shopping district of southwestern San Francisco.

== Location ==
West Portal is located at the southern edge of the hills in central San Francisco. The neighborhood is named for the western terminus of the Muni tunnel beneath Twin Peaks that opened in 1918. The ride in the subway from West Portal Station to Castro Station is about seven minutes. By the West Portal Station, the K Ingleside and the M Ocean View go south along West Portal Avenue. The neighborhood is served by the 48 Quintara/24th Street and 57 Parkmerced Muni bus lines.

== Characteristics ==
Because of its small size and collection of mom and pop stores, restaurants, and saloons, the neighborhood is often described as having a village-like atmosphere. The neighborhood is served by the West Portal Branch of the San Francisco Public Library. Like Glen Park, West Portal is a San Francisco community that almost functions as a small city itself. Though small, the neighborhood has many banks, restaurants of many types, coffee shops, salons, post office, elementary school, drug store, bakery, ice cream shop, real estate agents, and spas. West Portal Avenue is dotted with locally owned and operated businesses which include a record store, book store, toy and craft store, clothing boutiques, produce market, candy shop, and hardware store. West Portal Avenue also has many professional services such as dentists, lawyers, accountants, optometrists, and urgent care facilities.

The frequent fog helps keep the area green in the usually rainless summer months, and on a clear day, West Portal Park, above the Twin Peaks Tunnel, provides a view of the Marin Headlands and the Farallon Islands in the Pacific.

== Transit ==
The neighborhood is served by the Muni train lines M Ocean View, S Shuttle, K Ingleside, and L Taraval.
