= St. Francis Wood, San Francisco =

- St Francis Wood
- U.S. Historic district
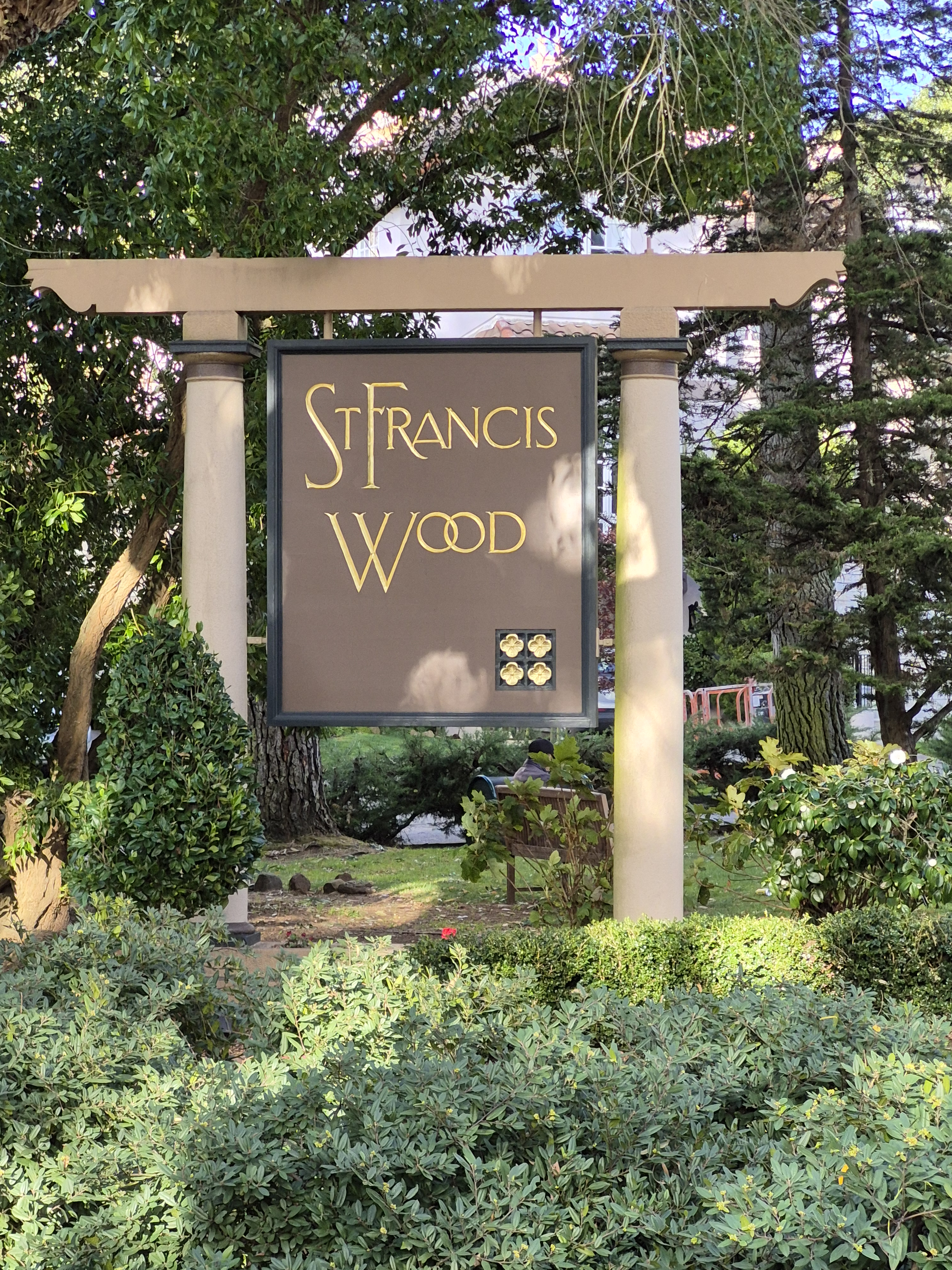
- Location: San Francisco, California
- Built: 1912
- Architect: Olmsted Brothers
- Architectural style: Beaux-Arts and Neoclassical
- NRHP reference No.: 05658
- Added to NRHP: June 30, 2022

St. Francis Wood is a residential neighborhood located on the West Side of San Francisco, California, United States, south of the West Portal neighborhood and west of Mount Davidson. Characterized by large single family homes on spacious lots (by San Francisco standards), St. Francis Wood has no businesses or commercial activity and has a much lower profile compared to similar wealthy neighborhoods such as Pacific Heights or Sea Cliff.St. Francis Wood is one of eight master-planned residence parks in San Francisco and is listed on the National Register of Historic Places as St. Francis Wood Historic District.

== History ==
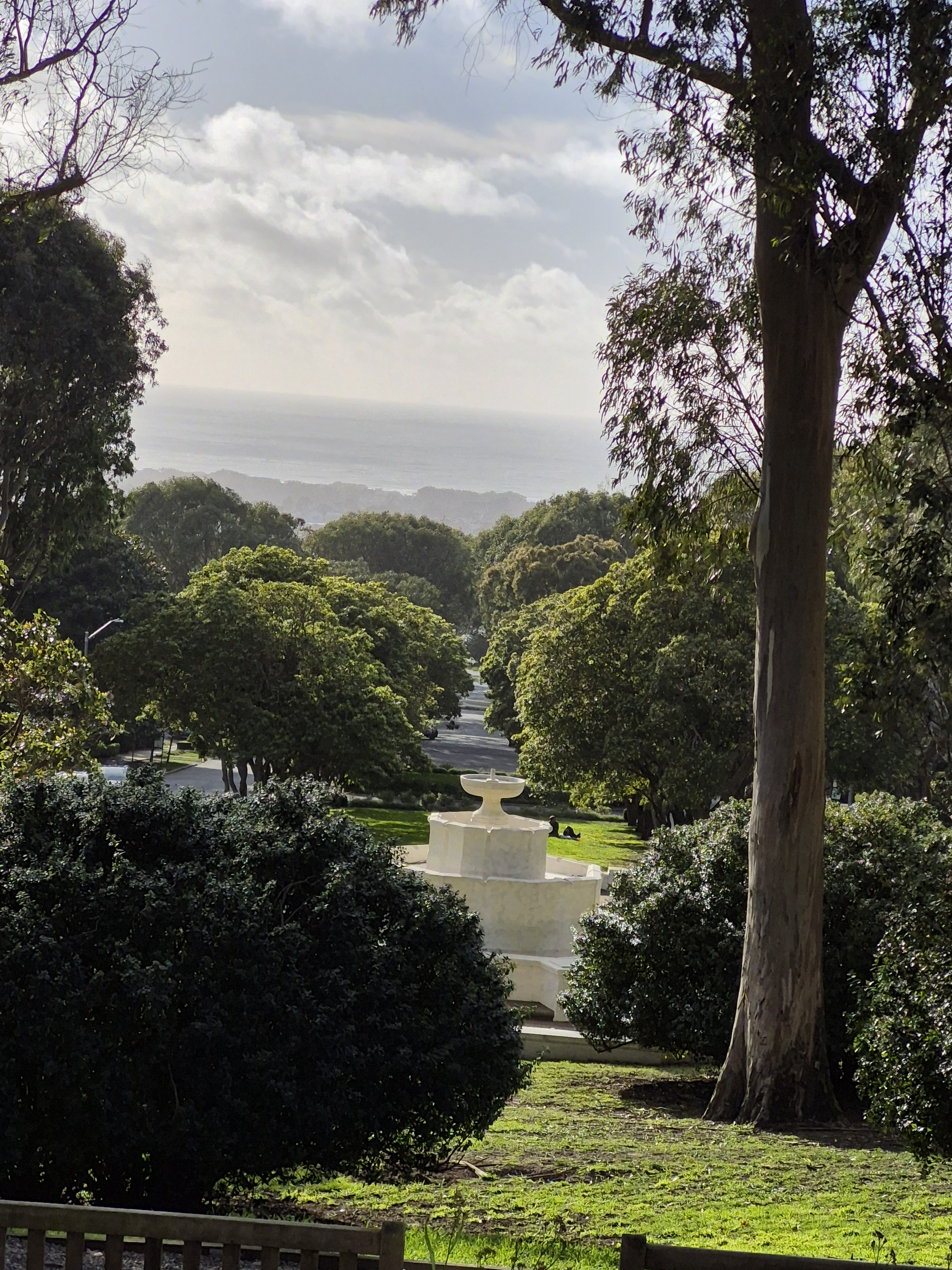
St Francis Wood looking towards Pacific Ocean.

St. Francis Wood was established in 1912 as an upper-middle-class residential neighborhood with streetcar access to downtown jobs. Designed as a "residence park," it reflected City Beautiful principles with curvilinear streets, landscaped medians, and decorative monuments laid out by the Olmsted Brothers.

=== Historic designation ===
On June 30, 2022, St. Francis Wood was added to the National Register of Historic Places after a campaign by residents citing the neighborhood’s origins as a 20th-century residence park and its collection of architecturally significant homes. The historic designation requires construction projects to undergo review under the California Environmental Quality Act (CEQA), which may add costs and approval time. New projects must also be compatible with the area's historic character, which typically includes two-story single-family homes with spacious yards.

The designation received criticism from housing advocates and State Senator Scott Wiener, who argued it could hinder efforts to add new housing in the neighborhood and potentially conflict with state housing laws aimed at increasing density. Supporters of the designation, including the St. Francis Homes Association, maintained that the intent was to preserve the neighborhood’s architectural heritage and emphasized that the community is open and diverse.

== Demographics ==
Race and ethnicity
Asian	730	(45.3%)
White non-Hispanic	726	(45%)
Hispanic (excluding Black and Asian)	87	(5.4%)
Other non-Hispanic	48	(2.98%)
Mixed non-Hispanic	17	(1.05%)
Black	4	(0.248%)

In the two 2020 census tracts that contain St. Francis Wood 2020 census, at least 80% of the residents are White or Asian. The median household income is $188,400.
