= List of parks in San Francisco =

This is a list of parks in San Francisco.

== Federal ==
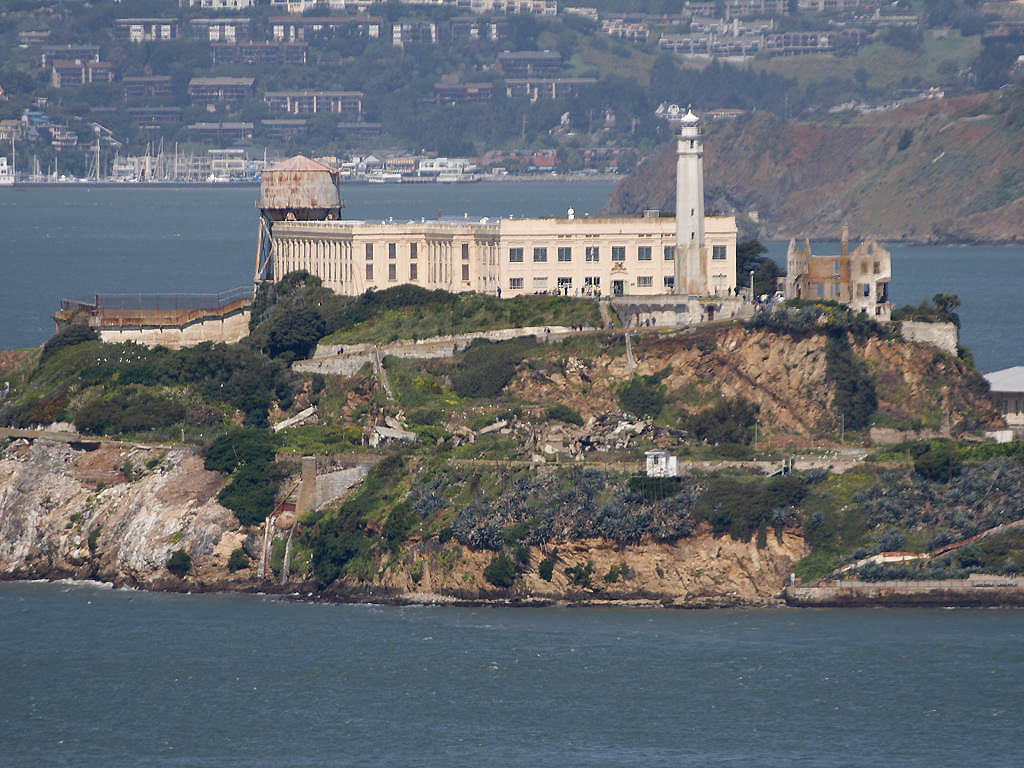
Alcatraz Island in San Francisco Bay, part of the Golden Gate National Recreation Area.

National Park Service

- Golden Gate National Recreation Area (partially), including
  - Alcatraz
  - China Beach
  - Fort Funston
  - Fort Mason
  - Fort Miley (partially)
  - Lands End
  - Ocean Beach
  - The Presidio, including
    - Baker Beach
    - Crissy Field
    - Fort Point
    - San Francisco National Cemetery
  - Sutro District, including
    - Cliff House
    - Sutro Baths
    - Sutro Heights Park
- San Francisco Maritime National Historical Park, including
  - Aquatic Park
  - Hyde Street Pier

United States Fish and Wildlife Service

- Farallon National Wildlife Refuge

National Oceanic and Atmospheric Administration

- Gulf of the Farallones National Marine Sanctuary (partially)

== State ==
California Department of Parks & Recreation

- Angel Island State Park (partially)
- Candlestick Point State Recreation Area

California Department of Fish and Game

- Farallon Islands State Marine Conservation Area

University of California

- Mount Sutro Open Space Reserve

== City ==
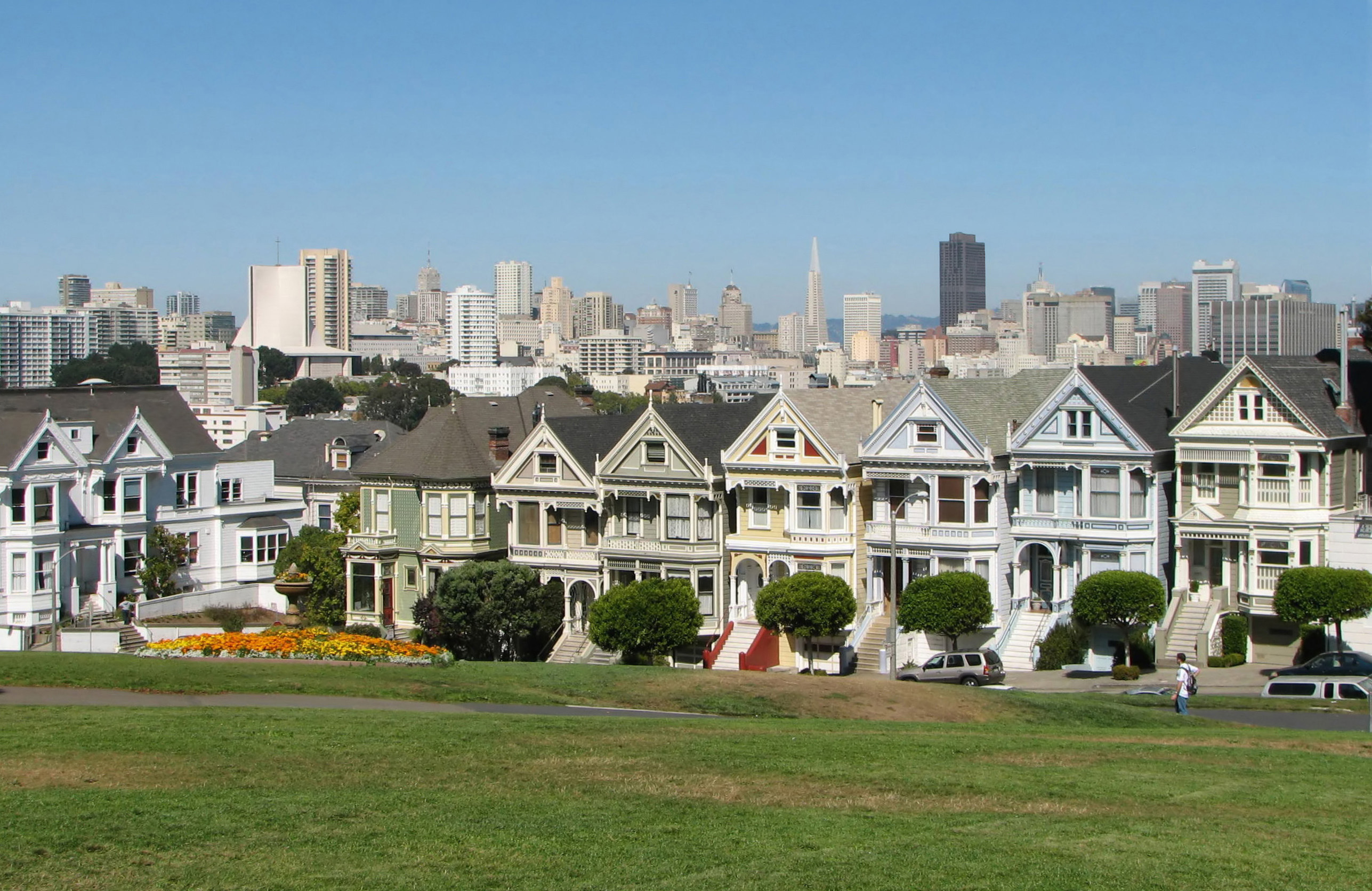
Painted Ladies, Alamo Square

San Francisco Recreation & Parks Department

- Alamo Square
- Alta Plaza
- Balboa Park
- Bayview Park
- Bernal Heights Park
- Boeddeker Park
- Buena Vista Park
- Candlestick Park
- Cayuga Park
- Corona Heights Park
- Crane Cove Park
- Dolores Park
- Duboce Park
- Edgehill Mountain Open Space Park
- Francisco Park
- Garfield Square
- Glen Canyon Park
- Golden Gate Heights Park
- Golden Gate Park, including
  - AIDS Memorial Grove (affiliated with the National Park Service as a national memorial)
  - California Academy of Sciences
  - Conservatory of Flowers
  - Japanese Tea Garden
  - Kezar Stadium
  - M. H. de Young Memorial Museum
  - Music Concourse
  - Polo Fields
  - San Francisco Botanical Garden
- Grand View Park
- Harding Park Golf Club
- Heron's Head Park
- Holly Park
- Huntington Park
- In Chan Kaajal Park
- Kite Hill
- Lincoln Park, including
  - California Palace of the Legion of Honor
- Lafayette Park (San Francisco)
- Lake Merced
- Larsen Park
- McLaren Park (John McLaren Park)
- Marina Green
- Mount Davidson Park
- Mount Olympus
- Mountain Lake Park
- Palace of Fine Arts
- The Panhandle
- Park Presidio Boulevard (roadway maintained by Caltrans)
- Pine Lake Park, including
  - Pine Lake
- Pink Triangle Park
- Pioneer Park, including
  - Coit Tower
- Portsmouth Square
- Potrero del Sol Park
- Precita Park
- Rocky Outcrop Park
- San Francisco Zoo
- Sigmund Stern Recreation Grove
- South Park
- Sue Bierman Park
- Sunset Dunes
- Twin Peaks
- Union Square
- Warm Water Cove
- Washington Square

Mini Parks

- 10th Avenue & Clement Mini Park
- 24th & York Mini Park
- Alioto Mini Park
- Beideman & O'Farrell Mini Park
- Broadway Tunnel East Mini Park
- Broadway Tunnel West Mini Park
- Brotherhood & Chester Mini Park
- Bush & Broderick Mini Park
- Cayuga & Lamartine Mini Park
- Coleridge Mini Park
- Coso & Precita Mini Park
- Cottage Row Mini Park
- Fallen Bridge Park
- Fillmore & Turk Mini Park
- Golden Gate & Steiner Mini Park
- Guy place mini park
- Head & Brotherhood Mini Park
- Howard & Langton Mini Park Community Garden
- Hyde & Vallejo Mini Park
- Ina Coolbrith Mini Park
- Joost & Baden Mini Park
- Joseph Conrad Mini Park
- Kelloch & Velasco Mini Park
- Lakeview & Ashton Mini Park
- LeConte Mini Park
- Lessing & Sears Mini Park
- Mullen & Peralta Mini Park
- Muriel Leff Mini Park
- Noe and Beaver Mini Park Community Garden
- Page & Laguna Mini Park
- Palou Phelps Mini Park
- Prentiss Mini Park
- Ralph D. House Community Park
- Randolph & Bright Mini Park
- Selby & Palou Mini Park
- Seward Mini Park
- Shoreview Park
- Turk-Hyde Mini Park
- Utah & 18th Mini Park
- Washington & Hyde Mini Park

Port of San Francisco

- China Basin Park

Office of Community Investment and Infrastructure (former San Francisco Redevelopment Agency)

- Mission Creek Park
- Rincon Park
- South Beach Park
- Sydney Walton Square (hybrid public and private)
- Yerba Buena Gardens

== Private ==
- Oracle Park
- Ghirardelli Square
- Levi's Plaza

=== Privately Owned Public Open Spaces ===
In certain districts, private developers must account for and maintain public spaces within their facilities. These Privately Owned Public Open Spaces (POPOS) take many forms and have varying hours of operation.

- 55 2nd St - A, B, C
- 101 2nd St
- 235 2nd St
- Marriott - 299 2nd St
  - Courtyard A
  - Courtyard B
  - Courtyard C
- Marathon Plaza - 303 2nd St
- 1 Bush Street
- 345 California St
  - A
  - East B
  - West C
- 1 California St
- 50 California St
- 100 California St
- 150 California St
- 200 California St
- 555 California St
- 600 California St
- 650 California St
- Empire Park - 648 Commercial St.
- Embarcadero Center West 1, 2, & 3
- 611 Folsom St
- 14 Fremont St
- Foundry Square - 400, 405, 500 Howard St
- Intercontinental Hotel - 888 Howard St.
  - Pacific Terrace
  - Bay Terrace
- 25 Jessie St
- 1 Kearny St
- 333 Market St
- 425 Market St
- 444 Market St
- 525 Market St
- 555/557 Market St
- 595 Market St
- Westfield Sky Terrace - 845 Market St
- Golden Gate University - 536 Mission St
- 555 Mission St
- 560 Mission St
- 456 Montgomery St
- 100 Pine St
- 1 Post St
- Citigroup Center - 1 Sansome St
- 343 Sansome St
- 49 Stevenson St
- 71 Stevenson St
- Crocker Galleria - 165 Sutter St
- Trinity Alley - at 333 Bush St
- 77 Van Ness Ave
- Redwood Park - 535 Washington St

== See also ==
- 10-Minute Walk
- Golden Gate National Parks Conservancy
- San Francisco Parks Alliance
- San Francisco Crosstown Trail
