= Parkside, San Francisco =

Parkside
- Neighborhood
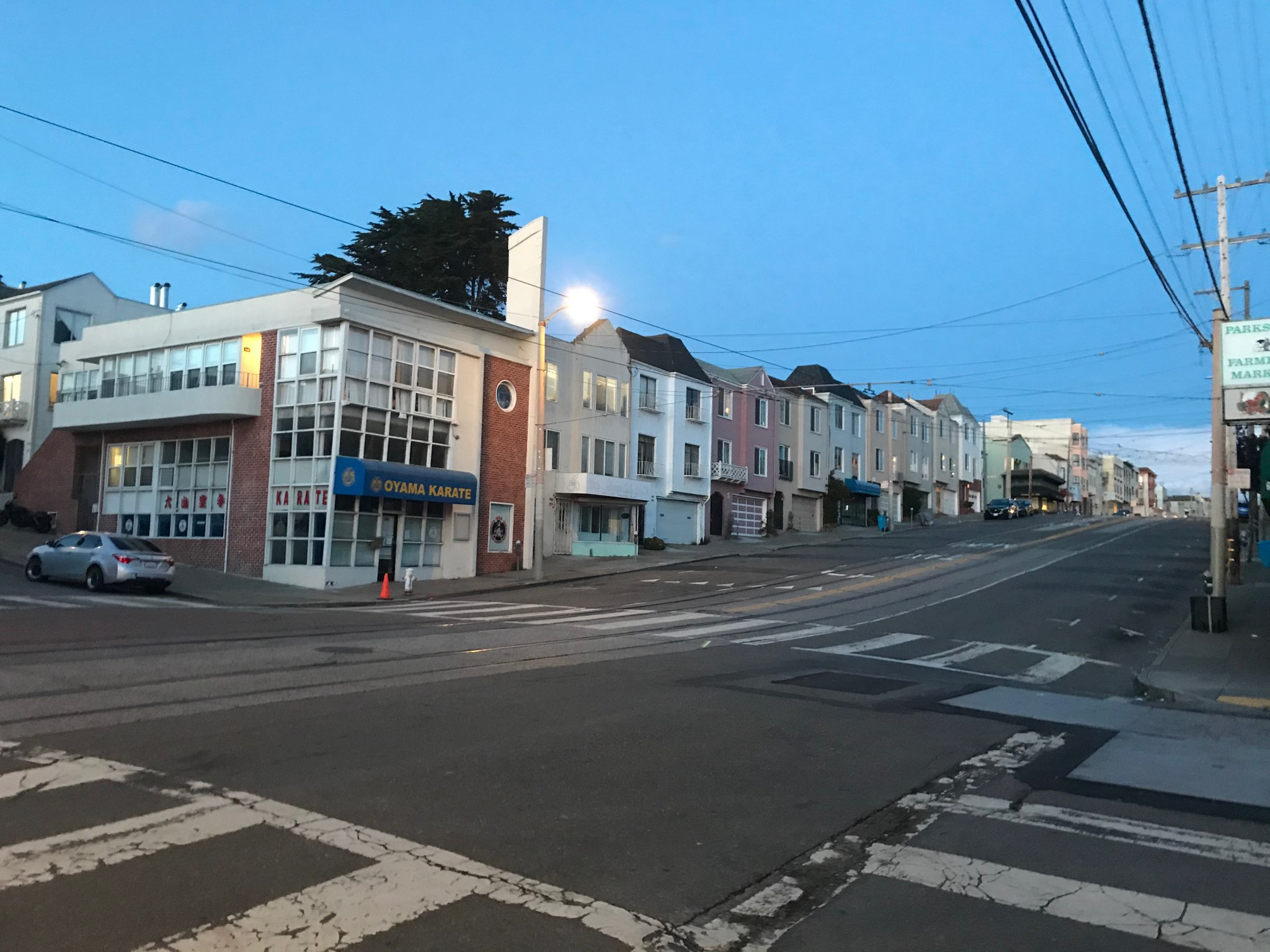
- Taraval Street and 16th Ave.

- Location within San Francisco
- Coordinates: 37.744°N 122.480°W
- Country: United States
- State: California
- City-county: San Francisco

Government
  - Supervisor: Beya Alcaraz
  - Assemblymember: Catherine Stefani (D)
  - State senator: Scott Wiener (D)
  - U. S. rep.: Nancy Pelosi (D)

Area
  - Total: 1.066 sq mi (2.76 km^{2})

Population
  - Total: 16,874
  - Density: 15,825/sq mi (6,110/km^{2})
- ZIP codes: 94116
- Area codes: 415/628

The Parkside is a neighborhood on the West Side of San Francisco, California. It is located in the southern part of the Avenues south of Quintara and north of Sloat Boulevard. The Parkside neighborhood is according to some definitions located within the greater Sunset District.

Also referred to as the "Parkside District," the neighborhood includes the following parks: Parkside Square, Pine Lake, Pine Lake Park (a.k.a. Dog Park), Concert Meadow, Charlie Sava Pool (formerly Carl Larsen Pool), Carl Larsen Park, Stern Grove, McCoppin Park, and McCoppin Square.

== Location ==
The Parkside as a neighborhood started in July 1905 when a syndicate led by William Crocker announced they had quietly bought land from the estate of Adolph Sutro and others to create a new million-dollar development. The "park" of Parkside was not Golden Gate Park, but rather the stand of trees and plants around Laguna Puerca (now called Pine Lake, and often called "Mud Lake" or "Crawdad Lake" by old-timers) west of Sigmund Stern Grove.

The boundaries of the Parkside consist of Quintara Street on the north, Sloat Boulevard on the south, 36th Avenue/Sunset Boulevard on the west, and a diagonal eastern boundary line that abuts on the former Rancho San Miguel property, running from 12th Avenue on the north to 19th Avenue and Sloat on the south. Later with more development to the west from Sloat Boulevard west to the ocean, east to Quintara and south to the San Francisco Zoo the Outer Parkside is also part of the Parkside District of San Francisco.

Parkside Elementary School (located at 25th Avenue and Vicente Street) was closed in 1975 and torn down in 2004. In its place today stands Dianne Feinstein Elementary School at the Parkside Campus. Parkside Library is located at 22nd Avenue and Taraval.

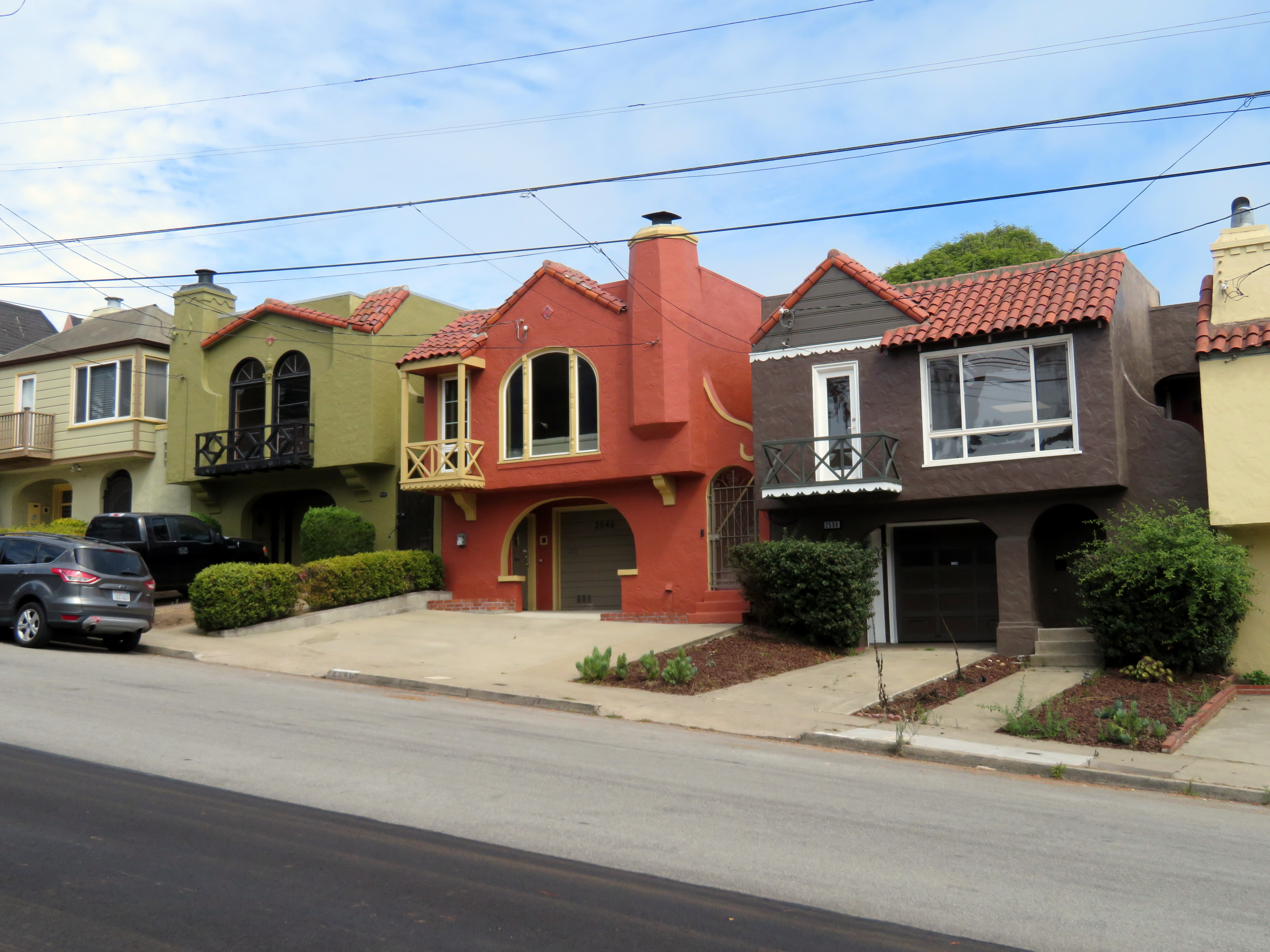
Parkside's distinctive houses

== Characteristics ==
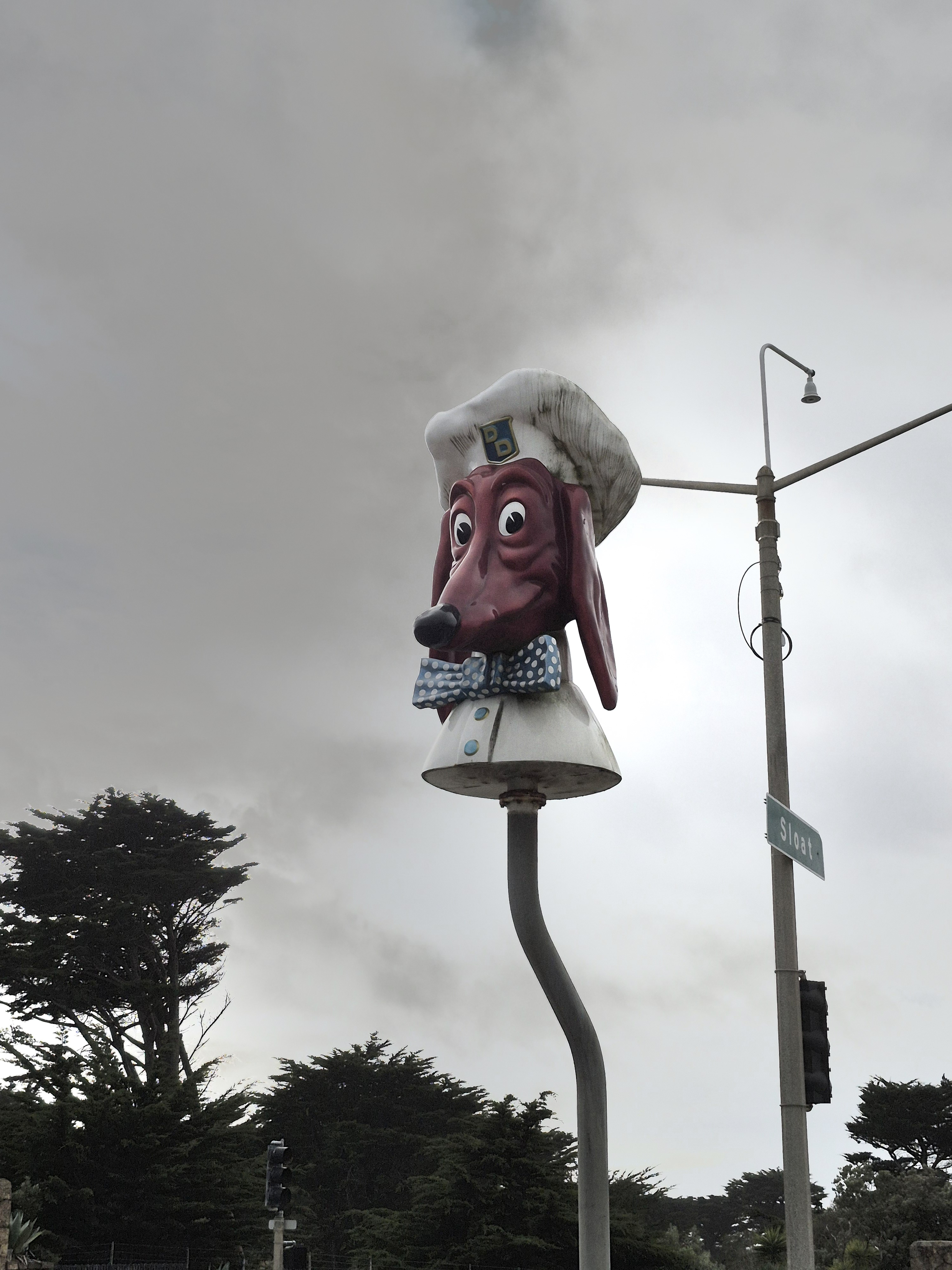
Doggie Diner sign located on Sloat Boulevard.

The area is mostly residential, except for the commercial corridor on Taraval Street. Its buildings largely consist of almost identical "cookie-cutter" stucco houses with various decorative elements, which were constructed in the 1920s and 1930s, when assembly-line techniques entered building construction. The L Taraval of the Muni Metro serves the neighborhood and provides a mode of transportation to downtown. Other transit lines include the 29 Sunset, 48 Quintara-24th Street, 66 Quintara, and 18 46th Avenue.

The Parkside branch of the San Francisco Public Library is also located in the area.

The Sigmund Stern Recreation Grove is known as the location of the Stern Grove Festival summer concerts.

The neighborhood is represented by District 4. The current District 4 supervisor is Alan Wong.
