= In Chan Kaajal Park =

Park in San Francisco

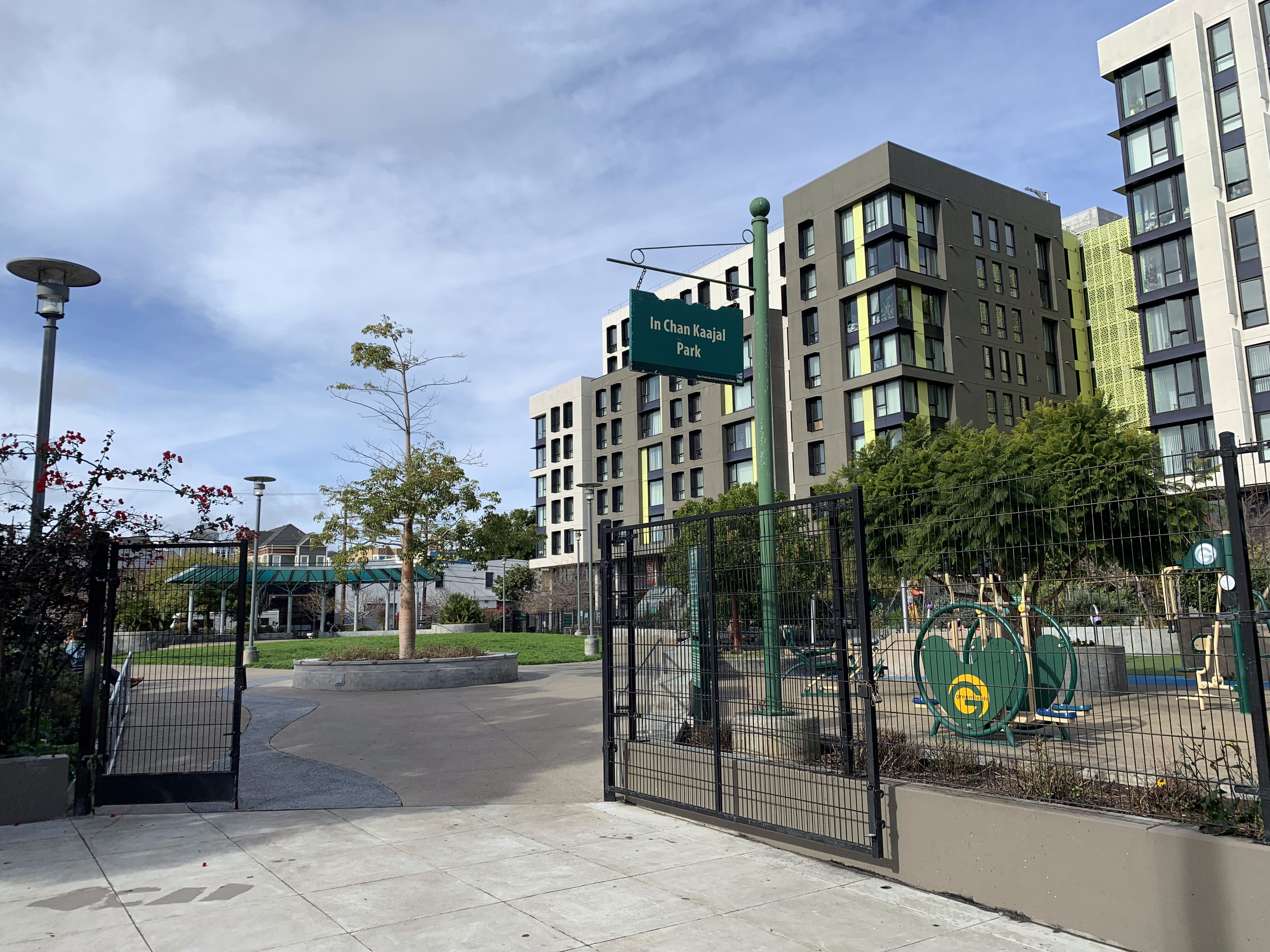
- View of In Chan Kaajal Park, facing northwest.
- Interactive map of In Chan Kaajal Park
- Type: Urban park
- Location: San Francisco, California
- Coordinates: 37.7639°N 122.4158°W
- Established: June 2017; 8 years ago
- Operated by: San Francisco Recreation & Parks Department

In Chan Kaajal Park is a public park in the Mission District of San Francisco, USA, located north of 17th Street between Folsom and Shotwell Street.

It was inaugurated in June 2017 as the city's first new park in over 10 years. El Tecolote described the opening as "a hard-won victory for the Latino and Indigenous communities of the Mission, who have lobbied for years for its creation". The park's name, chosen by a community vote, means "My Little Town" in the Yucatec Maya language, and is also sometimes rendered together with its Spanish translation as "In Chan Kaajal (Mi Pueblito)". It reflects San Francisco's significant Mayan American minority, consisting of immigrants who since the 1990s arrived from Mexico's Yucatán region and settled mainly in the northern Mission and the Tenderloin.

Facilities include a playground, a gym for adults, a drought-resistant community garden, greenhouses, and a small stage for public performances on the central plaza. An interactive water installation commemorates Mission Creek, which used to run through the site. Artist Carmen Lomas Garza created renderings of a California condor and a great blue heron adorning the fence, commissioned by the San Francisco Arts Commission.

The park was constructed on a former parking lot, with a budget of $5.2 million. The planning process had begun in 2008 and saw city agencies partnering with a local grassroots organization named PODER (People Organizing to Demand Environmental and Economic Justice) and various neighborhood associations. On the remaining area adjacent to the park, a 127-unit affordable housing project broke ground in 2019.

== See also ==
- Cayuga Park
