= Holly Park =

Holly Park may refer to:

Place names:

- Holly Park, Ontario, a hamlet within the township of King, Ontario
- Holly Park, California, a place in Los Angeles County, California
- Holly Park, New Jersey, an unincorporated community
- Holly Park (San Francisco), a park in San Francisco, California
- Holly Park, Seattle, Washington, the former name of NewHolly, a neighborhood in the Beacon Hill district of the city
- Holly Park, a former stadium of South Liverpool F.C. in Garston, Merseyside
- Holly Park, a municipal park in the Bernal Heights neighborhood of San Francisco, California
- Holly Park, the former name of Priory, a house in Rathfarnham, a southside suburb of Dublin, Ireland

Other uses:

- "Holly Park", a song on the album The American Dream by Emitt Rhodes

== See also ==
- Holly Recreation Area, a state-run park near Holly, Michigan
