= Cayuga =

Cayuga often refers to:

- Cayuga people, a native tribe to North America, part of the Haudenosaunee Confederacy
- Cayuga language, the language of the Cayuga

Cayuga may also refer to:

== Places ==
=== Canada ===
- Cayuga, Ontario

=== United States ===
- Cayuga, Illinois
- Cayuga, Indiana
- Cayuga, Mississippi
- Cayuga, New York
- Cayuga, North Dakota
- Cayuga, Texas
- Cayuga, Oklahoma
- Cayuga, Wisconsin
- Cayuga County, New York
- Cayuga Island, in Niagara River
- Cayuga Lake, one of the Finger Lakes in New York
  - Cayuga Lake AVA, a New York wine region
- Cayuga Falls, a waterfall in Ricketts Glen State Park in Pennsylvania
- Cayuga Park, Saint Paul, Minnesota
- Cayuga Terrace, a neighborhood in San Francisco, California

== Other uses ==
- Cayuga duck, a breed of domestic duck
- Cayuga Generating Station, a coal-fired power plant in Indiana
- Cayuga Pictures, a film production company owned by Gardner Hunting and James H. Naulty
- Cayuga Productions, Rod Serling's production company, which notably produced The Twilight Zone
- Cayuga White, a variety of grape
- Cayuga (passenger train), a US passenger train operated by the New York Central Railroad and Amtrak
- USS Cayuga, three ships in the United States Navy
- HMCS Cayuga, a Tribal class destroyer with the Royal Canadian Navy
- SS Cayuga, one of the early steel cargo ships to ply the Great Lakes, sunk in Lake Michigan in 1895
- Cayuga, a synonym of the moth genus Peoria (moth)
- Cayuga, a fictional New Mexican town in the movie The Vast of Night
