= Pine Lake Park (San Francisco) =

Municipal park in San Francisco, California, United States

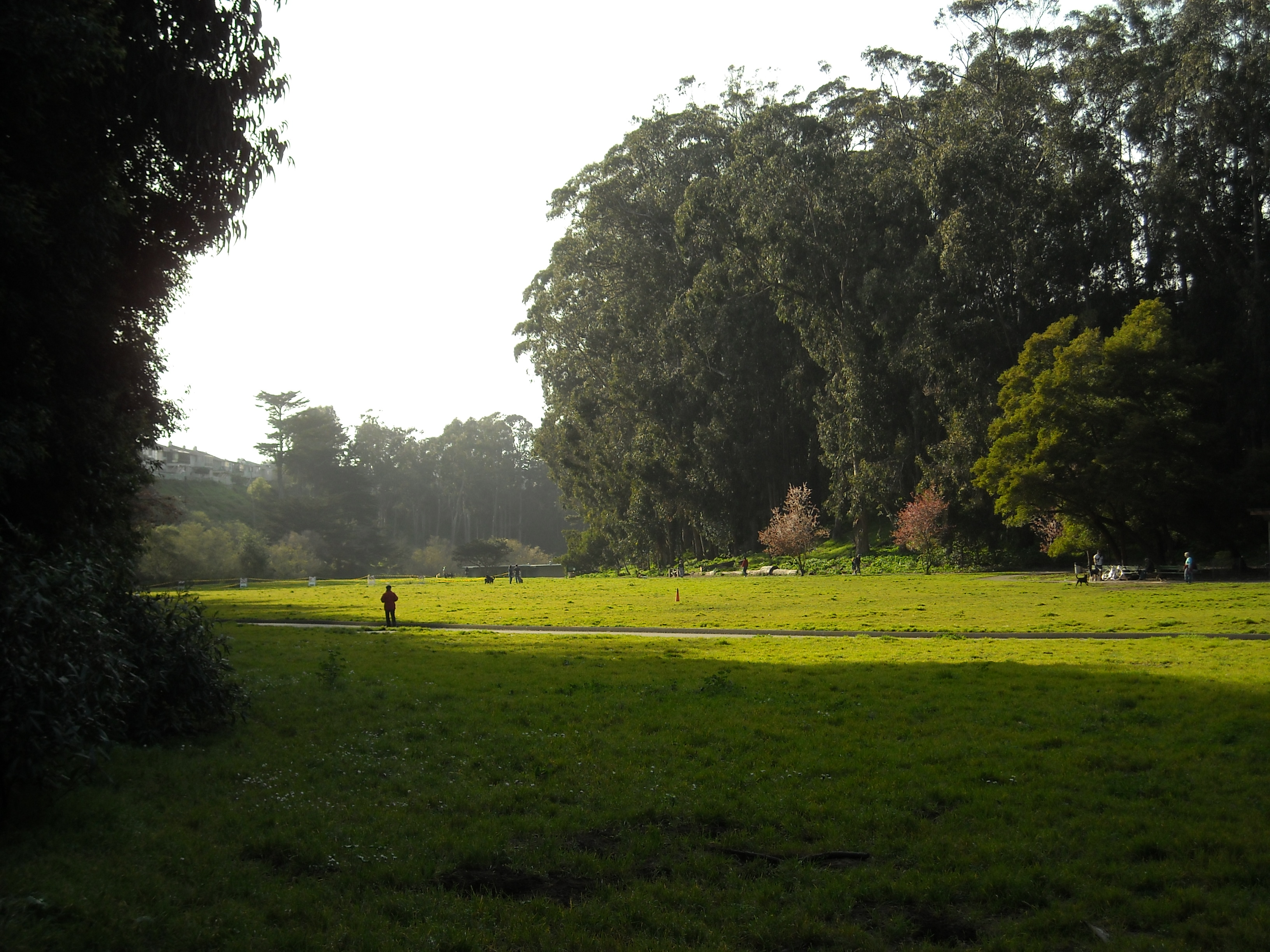
- Interactive map of Pine Lake Park
- Type: Municipal (San Francisco)
- Location: San Francisco
- Coordinates: 37.7363086°N 122.4859274°W
- Area: 30.29 acres (12.26 ha)
- Open: 6am to 10pm
- Status: Open all year
- Parking: Parking lot

Pine Lake Park is a park located on the West Side of San Francisco, which encompasses Pine Lake.

== History ==
Following their move from Maine to San Francisco in 1847, the Greene family purchased a large property which included Stern Grove and Pine Lake. In 1887, a lawsuit forced the family to give up most of the property and allowed them to retain only the portion which today comprises the park and adjacent Sigmund Stern Recreation Grove. The family planted the eucalyptus trees that continue to surround the lake.

The land and lake were purchased by the City of San Francisco in the five years following the opening of the adjoining Sigmund Stern Recreation Grove in 1932.

== Geography ==
Pine Lake Park is located in the southwest corner of San Francisco and occupies 30.29 acres (12.26 ha). The park encompasses Pine Lake and is adjacent to Sigmund Stern Recreation Grove.

== Ecology ==
Migratory birds along the Pacific Flyway stop to feed, rest, or inhabit the surrounding area.

== Features ==
A trail encircles the lake and connects to a larger trail network through Stern Grove and a segment of the Bay Area Ridge Trail.

The park includes a dog play area.

== Operations ==
The park is operated by the San Francisco Recreation and Parks Department. It is open all year from 6am to 10pm.

== See also ==
- Parks in San Francisco
