= Alta Plaza Park =

Public park in San Francisco

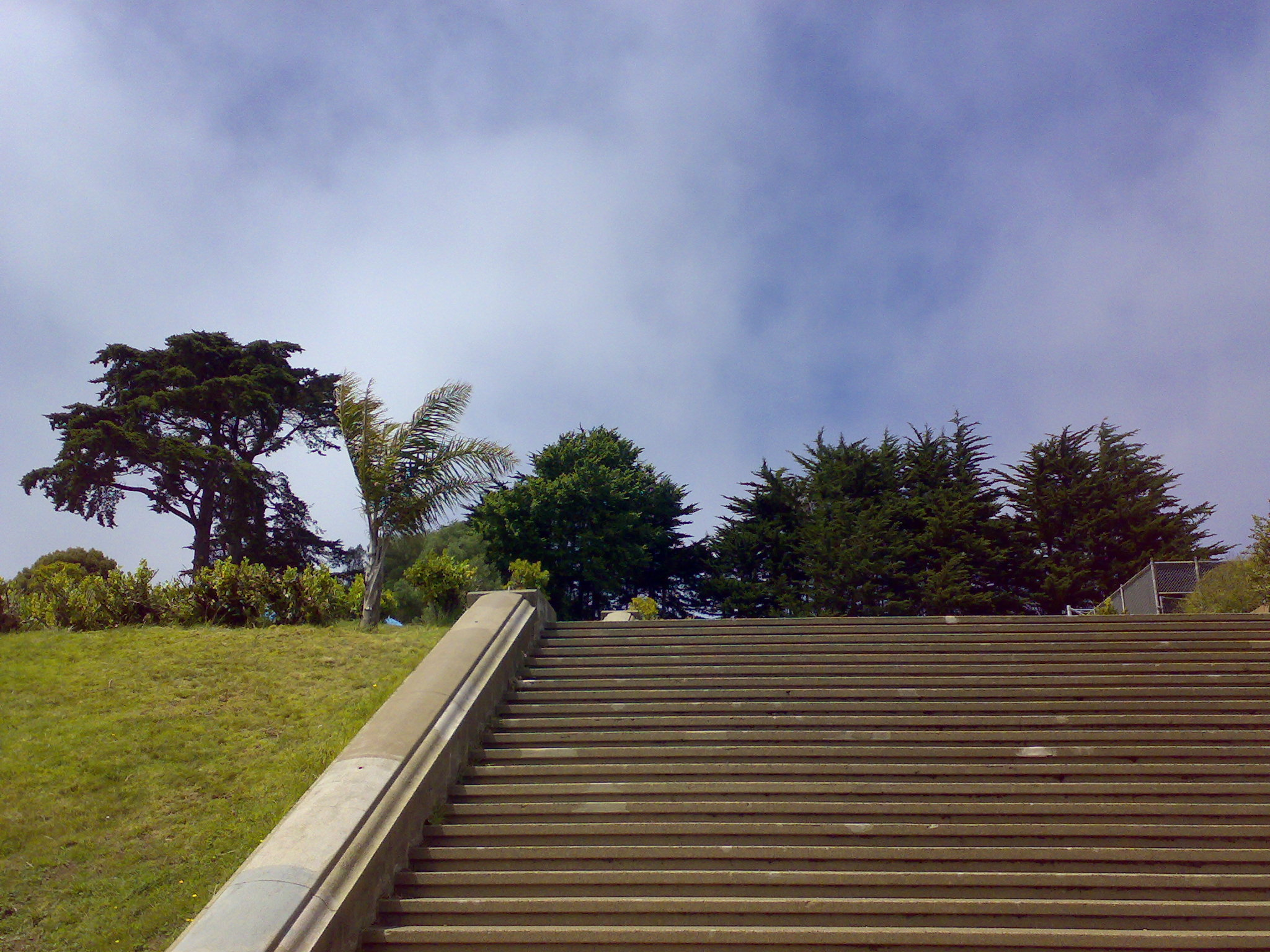
- Alta Plaza park stairs
- Interactive map of Alta Plaza Park
- Type: Municipal park
- Location: Jackson & Steiner
- Coordinates: 37°47′28″N 122°26′16″W
- Area: 12.9 acres (5.2 ha; 0.0202 mi^{2}; 0.052 km^{2})
- Established: 1888
- Owner: San Francisco Recreation & Parks Department
- Operator: San Francisco Recreation & Parks Department
- Open: All year, 5 a.m. to Midnight

Alta Plaza Park is a 12.9-acre (5.2 ha) public park in San Francisco, California and caps the top of the western edge of Pacific Heights. It falls under the jurisdiction of the city's Supervisorial District 2. The park is served by several San Francisco Municipal Railway bus lines. It gets its name from the eponymous spring.

== Background ==
Alta Plaza consists of four square blocks at the top of Pacific Heights and overlooks much of San Francisco's Marina and Cow Hollow Districts, the Presidio, Fort Mason and Alcatraz. It is bordered by Jackson Street on the north, Clay Street to the south, and with Steiner and Scott Streets on its east and west edges, respectively. The plaza cuts off the east–west continuation of Washington Street and north–south continuation of Pierce Street. The plaza provides three hard surface tennis courts and a small playground in its center and has a large grass park on its northern half and terraced lawns on it southern half.

The steps at Alta Plaza are featured in the 1972 film What's Up, Doc?. They were used without permission and were badly damaged during filming of the signature chase scene (in which a Volkswagen Beetle, a Yellow Cab, a black Cadillac Fleetwood limousine and a Cadillac DeVille Convertible all clumsily speed down the steps), and the damage can still be seen today.

== See also ==
- San Francisco Parks
- 49-Mile Scenic Drive
