= Carmen Lomas Garza =

American artist and illustrator (born 1948)

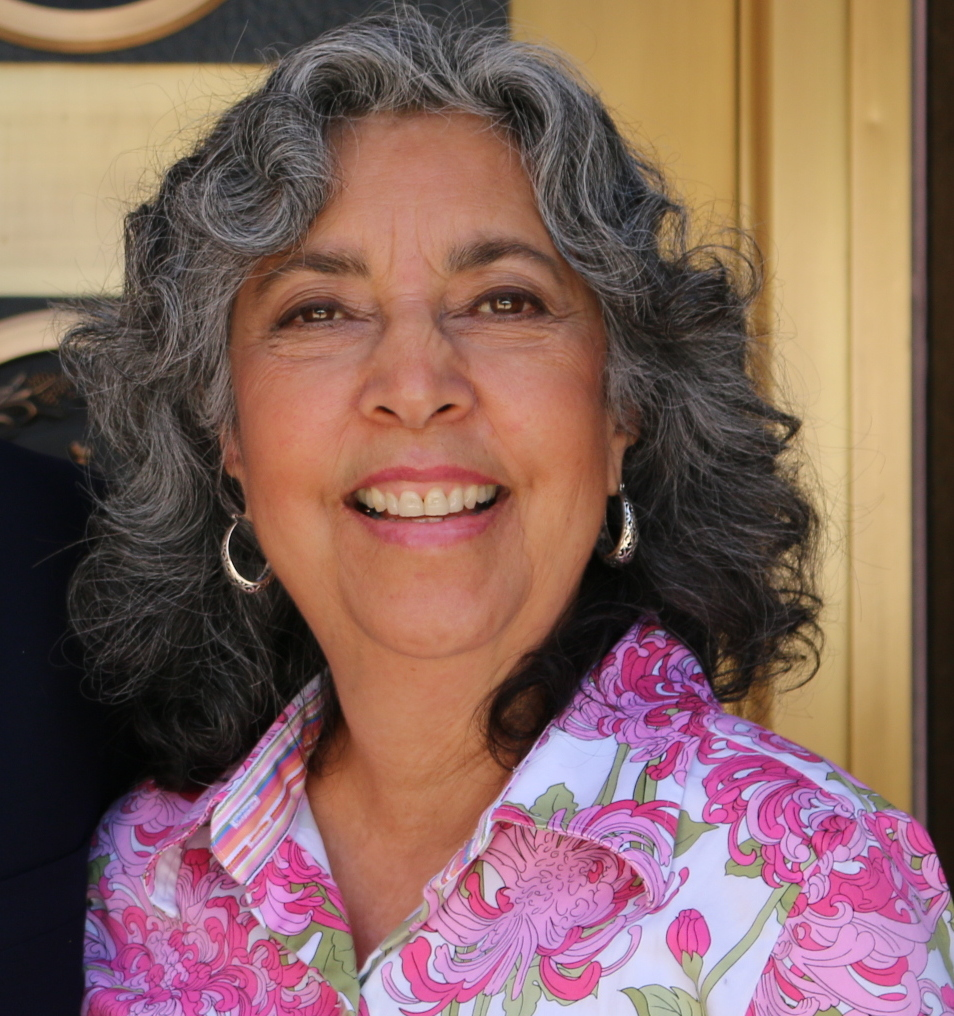
- Born: 1948 (age 77–78); Kingsville, Texas, U.S.
- Education: Texas Arts & Industry University (B.S.); Juarez-Lincoln/Antioch Graduate School (M.E.); San Francisco State University (M.A.)
- Known for: painting, illustration
- Website: www.carmenlomasgarza.com

Carmen Lomas Garza (born September 12,1948) is a Chicana artist and illustrator. She is well known for her paintings, ofrendas and for her papel picado work inspired by her Mexican-American heritage. Her work is a part of the permanent collections of the Smithsonian American Art Museum, the Hirshhorn Museum and Sculpture Garden, the National Museum of Mexican Art, the San Jose Museum of Art, the Mexican Museum, the Pennsylvania Academy of the Fine Arts, and the Oakland Museum of California, among other institutions.

== Early years ==
Garza was born in 1949 in Kingsville, Texas. She is the second of five children. Garza loved watching her mother paint, and felt like what her mother did was magic. Garza helped her grandmother create embroidery patterns using paper cutouts as a young child. The influence of her mother's and grandmother's art-making was very strong and by age thirteen Garza had decided she would be an artist. Her parents encouraged her to pursue her interests in college.

Most of the families living in her community growing up were Mexican-American just like her family. When Garza and her brother started to attend school, speaking Spanish was not tolerated. They were often teased by other children who did not understand their culture. Even when Garza attended high school, speaking Spanish was still not tolerated. She and her friends were hit with a paddle as a punishment if they spoke Spanish.

Garza first attended Texas Arts and Industry University (now Texas A&M University, Kingsville). Her parents had been involved in political organizing through the American GI Forum, and Garza followed in their footsteps by organizing a book store Chicanos on her college campus. In 1972, she received a BS in art education and a Texas Teaching Certificate at Texas Arts and Industry. During her undergraduate studies, she decided that it was important for her to design pieces of art that would be understood by people of all ages. Garza learned to be proud of her culture and wanted to educate others using her art.

Later, Garza received a Master of Education in 1973 at Juarez-Lincoln/Antioch Graduate School and a Master of Art in 1981 from San Francisco State University.

As of 1976, Garza lives in San Francisco, California.

== Career ==
Walter Alvarez (2019), at the National Portrait Gallery in Washington, D.C.

The initial roots of Garza's artwork lay in her family, to whom she is close, and in the Chicano Movement. Garza later wrote that the Chicano Movement nourished her goal of being an artist and gave her back her voice. She says that her artistic creations helped her "heal the wounds inflicted by discrimination and racism." Garza also feels that by creating positive images of Mexican-American families, her work can help combat racism. Her choice to use personal and family images to combat racism is a departure from more political works by many Chicano artists. The creation of her narrative, rather than one that is forced on her, however, speaks against racism on its own.

Garza incorporates little figures (monitos) in her artwork. The figures and their interactions with the spaces they inhabit show how Chicano/a identities are connected to the places she paints. Her paintings are also idealized and the figures become archetypes. Her flattened figures and sense of space create "a sense of immediacy," letting the viewer interact directly with the subject matter.

Art Hazelwood, et al, write in Mission Gráfica, "Garza's work follows and updates a traditional style both subject matter and in techniques. Her figures are flat and colorful in the folk tradition. She also employs the tradition of paper picador (cut paper) as the basis for her large, cut-steel, public art pieces. . . The imagery often refers to aspects of Tejana (Texan Mexican American) culture, including daily family life."

Garza has made Day of the Dead ofrendas, or ritual altars, to honor not just family members, but also people from history. She has made ofrendas for Frida Kahlo, Doña Sebastiana, and Tenochtitlán.

She has created eight paintings for the San Francisco Water Department and a sculpture at San Francisco International Airport. In Chan Kaajal Park, a park opened in 2017 in San Francisco's Mission District, features renderings of a California condor and a great blue heron by Garza, commissioned by the San Francisco Arts Commission.

As an author-illustrator, Garza has authored bilingual children's books that are notable for the bilingual text and vivid illustrations. She draws on Chicano culture, family stories, memories, and her heritage. Her archives are held by the Benson Latin American Collection.

== Exhibitions ==
In 2013, Garza's Cama para Suenos (1985) and Loteria-Tabla Llena (1972) were included in the Smithsonian American Art Museum's Our America: The Latino Presence in American Art.

Garza was also featured in the University of Texas at Austin's 7th Annual ¡A Viva Voz! where she talked and exhibited over 20 of her works. The exhibit ran from April through August 2009.

Carmen Lomas Garza: A Retrospective was Garza's first retrospective and featured work from the mid-1970s to the present. It was organized by the San Jose Museum of Art, where it was on view from January to April 2001; it later traveled to the San Antonio Museum of Art, South Texas Institute for the Arts, Ellen Noël Art Museum, National Hispanic Cultural Center, and the Polk Museum of Art.

Carmen Lomas Garza: Picturing the Familiar, a major retrospective devoted to Garza presents works from five decades of the artist's oeuvre. The exhibition was organized by Arizona State University curator Alana Hernandez with Natalie Solis for the Cheech in Riverside, California, October 3, 2026–February 14, 2027.

=== Awards and honors ===
- Family Pictures/Cuadro de familia: One of the Best Books of the Year, Library of Congress (1990)
- 1996 Pura Belpré Award honor
- Vida Award, Arts Category
- Several California Arts Council Artist-in-Residence Grants
- National Endowment for the Arts Fellowships for Painting and Printmaking
- California Arts Council Fellowship
- In My Family/En mi familia 1998 Pura Belpré Award honor
- Magic Windows 2000 Pura Belpré Award medal
- A primary school in Los Angeles, the Carmen Lomas Garza Primary Center, is named in Garza's honor.

== Works cited ==
- Lomas Garza, Carmen (1994). A Piece of My Heart / Pedacito de Mi Corazon: The Art of Carmen Lomas Garza. New York: New Press. ISBN 978-1565841642.
- Meier, Matt S.; Margo Gutiérrez (2003). The Mexican American Experience: An Encyclopedia. Greenwood Publishing Group. pp. 155–157. ISBN 978-0-313-31643-2.
