= Stern Grove Festival =

Performing arts series in San Francisco

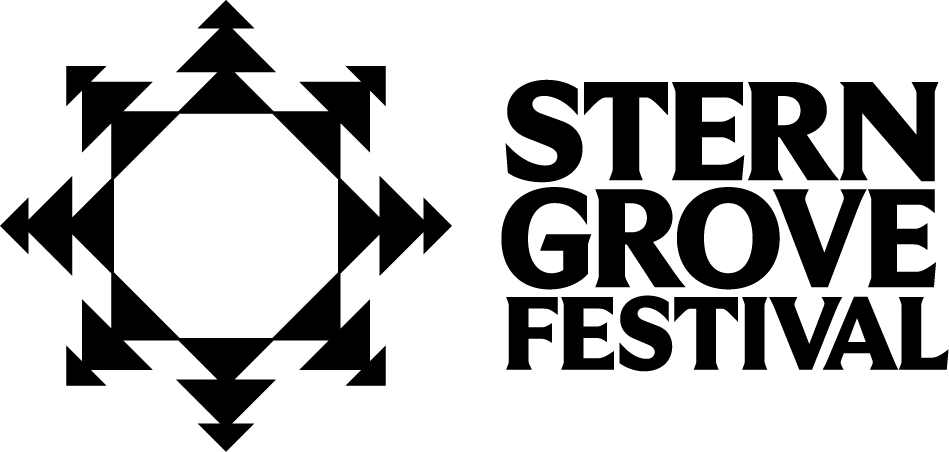

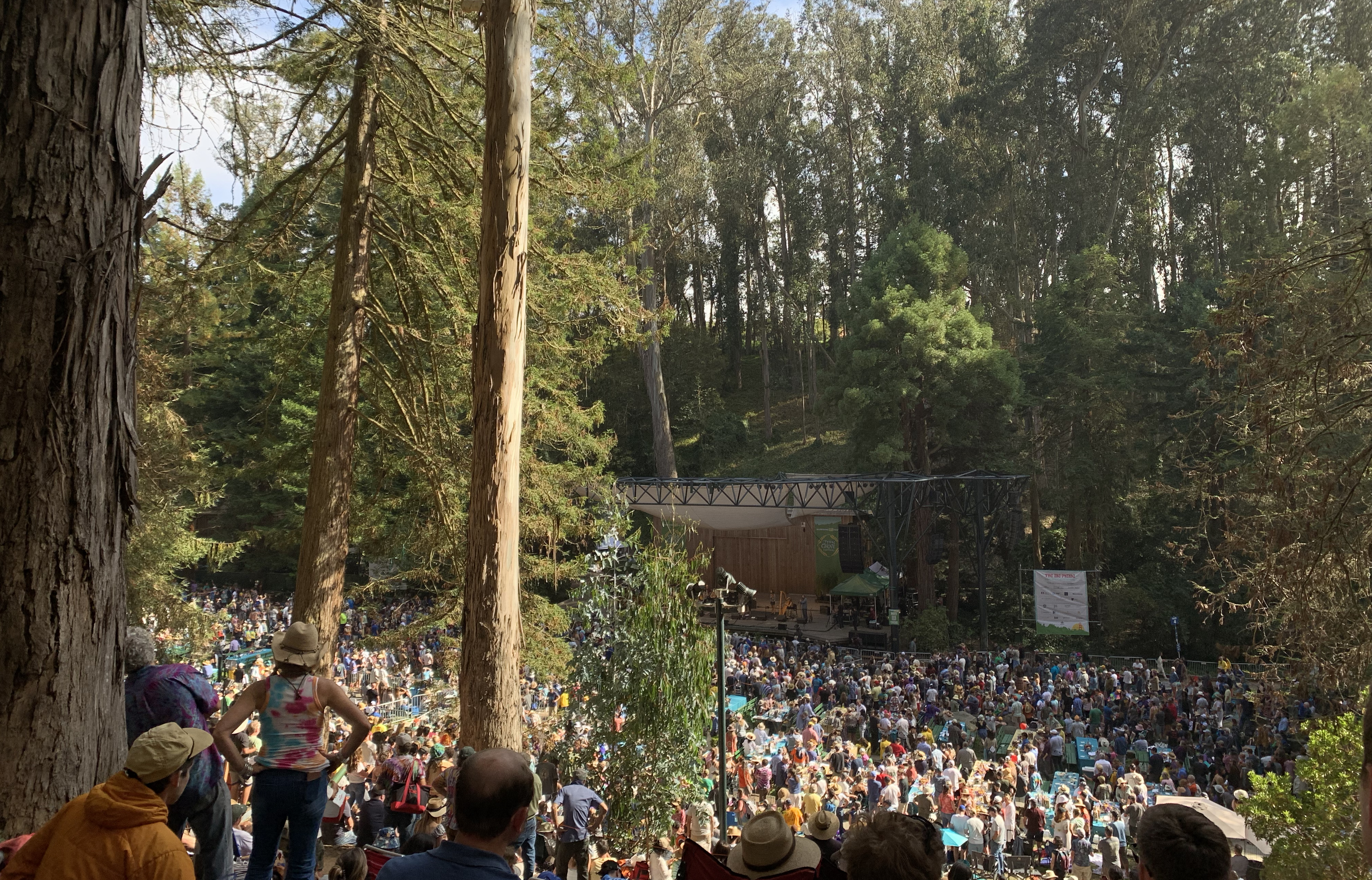
- Stern Grove in 2022
- Genre: Rock, pop, indie, hip hop, electronic dance music
- Dates: 10 consecutive Sundays in summer (currently)
- Locations: Sigmund Stern Recreation Grove (San Francisco, California, U.S.)
- Coordinates: 37.7362°N 122.4776°W
- Years active: 1938–1942, 1945–2019, 2021–present
- Attendance: 20,000
- Organizer: Stern Grove Festival Association
- Website: www.sterngrove.org

The Stern Grove Festival is an admission-free series of performing arts events held during the summer months in San Francisco. Established in 1938, the festival is held at Sigmund Stern Grove, a eucalyptus-wooded natural amphitheater on a 33-acre (130,000-square-meter) site about two miles (three kilometers) south of Golden Gate Park that ranges from 19th Avenue and Sloat Boulevard west to 34th Avenue.

This festival went on hiatus in 1942–45 due to World War II and in 2020 due to COVID-19.

The venue is accessible by public transportation, with Metro connection to the K Ingleside and M Ocean View lines at St. Francis Circle station, located about a five minute walk from the Nineteenth Avenue and Sloat Boulevard entrance.

== Background ==
Early plans for the Grove as a musical venue in the 1930s focused on maintaining the natural contour of the amphitheater bowl, with the surrounding garden, grassy slopes, and eucalyptus trees emphasizing the nature-oriented feel as a venue. Rosalie M. Stern saw the area's potential “because of its peaceful beauty, its historic interest, and, being below sea level, it is shielded from cold winds and fogs.” The Sigmund Stern Memorial Grove was dedicated June 4, 1932, and the first open air symphony concert was held two weeks later.

== History ==
The first summer concert of the first annual Stern Grove Festival was held on July 10, 1938 and performed by the Bay Region Symphony of the Federal Music Project. In 1943, the San Francisco Ballet performed at the Stern Grove Festival for the first time and has since become a staple in the summer season lineup.

In 1963, during the 25th Anniversary Season, the San Francisco Symphony performed; the photographer Ansel Adams was in attendance and took a series of photographs of the grove. Three years later, in 1966, the Festival had its first ever jazz concert, with Turk Murphy, John Handy, and Vince Guaraldi performing; the concert was taped and televised nationally on the Bell Telephone Hour. In 1980, a documentary about Stern Grove aired on PBS stations across the country.

Renovations on the Sigmund Stern Grove began in 2004 and were completed in time for the opening of its 68th season in June 2005. In May 2020, the Stern Grove Festival was canceled for the first time since World War II due to the COVID-19 pandemic; however, a TV special entitled "Best of Fest" was aired using archival footage of the festival and attracted more than half a million viewers.

=== Notable acts ===
Some notable acts who have performed at the Stern Grove Festival have included: Patti Smith (2023), LeAnn Rimes (2022), The Isley Brothers (2019), Ziggy Marley (2018), Kool & the Gang (2017), Janelle Monae (2016), Julieta Venegas (2016), Randy Newman (2015), Talib Kweli (2015), Smokey Robinson (2014), Michael McDonald (2013), Anita Baker (2012), and Roberta Flack (2009). Numerous cultural institutions in San Francisco also routinely take the stage during the Festival, including the San Francisco Opera, the San Francisco Ballet, the San Francisco Symphony. Notably, the musical lineup is frequently international in nature, spotlighting artists from across North, Central, and South America, Africa, the Caribbean, and Europe. A full list of performing artists is detailed below.

Year	Performing Artists
2026	Headliners: Peter Cat Recording Co, Bomba Estereo, Japanese Breakfast, Major Lazer, SF Symphony, Bela Fleck, Charley Crockett, Suki Waterhouse, Violent Femmes, Patti Labelle, Public Enemy, Al Green
2025	Headliners: Diana Ross, Damian Marley, Stephen Marley, The Pointer Sisters, Michael Franti, Orville Peck, Girl Talk, Chromeo, Phantogram, Sleater-Kinney, Channel Tres, The California Honey Drops Supporting Acts: J Boog, Jaime Wyatt, Lyrics Born, Black London, Ha Vay, Destroy Boys, ASTU, The Dip
2024	Headliners: Chaka Khan, Sylvan Esso, Lucinda Williams, Herbie Hancock, Alex G, Franc Moody, The Commodores, Masego, Chicano Batman, Teagan & Sara Supporting Acts: Steel Purse, Poolide, Jobi Riccio, Fake Fruit, DRAMA, The Grease Traps, Satya, Lido Pimienta, King Isis
2023	Headliners: The Flaming Lips, Patti Smith, Buddy Guy, Bob Moses, Angelique Kidjo, Lyle Lovett, Santigold, Indigo Girls, Snarky Puppy Supporting Acts: Neon Indian, Bob Mould, Eric Gales, Neil Francis, Jupiter & Okwess, Andrew St. James, Ogi, Neko Case, Isaiah Sharkey
2022	Headliners: Phil Lesh, Taj Mahal, LeAnn Rimes, Cat Power, Old Crow Medicine Show, Cold War Kids Supporting Acts: Midnight North, Geographer, Monoponics, Daniel Bartholomew-Poyser, Amythyst Kiah, Spelling, Molly Tuttle, Hgmny
2021	Headliners: Fitz and the Tantrums, Thundercat, Joan Jett & the Blackhearts, The Avengers, St. Paul & the Broken Bones, Thievery Corporation, Perfume Genius, Ledisi Supporting Acts: Devon Gilfillian, Cassowary, Dessa, Madame Gandhi, Honey Mahogany, La Doña
2020	Archival acts streamed online instead of live performances due to the COVID-19 pandemic.
2019	Headliners: The Isley Brothers, Pink Martini, The Psychedelic Furs, Toots & the Maytals, Mitski, Galactic, Los Van Van, Digable Planets Supporting Acts: Barrio Manouche, James, Lee Fields & the Expressions, Madeline Kenney, Erica Falls, Baby and the Luvies, Banda Sin Nombre, Bang Data
2018	Headliners: The Revolution, Booker T. Jones, Femi Kuti, Anoushka Shankar, Mexican Institute of Sound, M. Ward, Ziggy Marley, Jeffrey Osborne Supporting Acts: Big Blu Soul Review, The Humidors, Sol Development, Han Han, Celso Piña, Denise Gutiérrez, Sergio Arau, Ginkoa, Thao and the Get Down Stay Down, Jennifer Johns, Peabo Bryson
2017	Headliners: Mavis Staples, Brazilian Girls, WAR, Amadou & Mariam, Los Angeles Azules, Eric Burdon and The Animals, Nicki Bluhm & the Gramblers, Kool & The Gang Supporting Acts: Kev Choice Ensemble, Moon Hooch, Malo, Ibibio Sound Machine, Ximena Sarinana, Ensambles Ballet Folklorico de San Francisco, The Stone Foxes, Fantastic Negrito, Quinn DeVeaux
2016	Headliners: The New Pornographers, Atomic Bomb!, The O'Jays, Julieta Venegas, Joan Osborne, Hieroglyphics, George Clinton, Parliament Funkadelic, Janelle Monáe Supporting Acts: Astronauts, Luke Jenner, Jamie Lidell, Money Mark, Sinkane, Afrolicious, MJ's Brass Boppers, La Misa Negra, John Brothers Piano Company, Mix'd Ingrdnts, Golden State Breakers, Bayonics, Midtown Social
2015	Headliners: Talib Kweli, Morris Day, Mary Chapin Carpenter, Tune-Yards, Amy Hanaiali'l, Randy Newman, Pacific Mambo Orchestra Supporting Acts: Zakiya Harris, Elephantine, Con Brio, Bhi Bhiman, Dakha Brakha, Halau 'o Keikiali'i, Shara Worden, Renée Rapier, Julie Adams, Hot Club of San Francisco, Sheila E., Marlow Rosado, Salsamania
2014	Headliners: The Zombies, Sérgio Mendes, Darlene Love, Andrew Bird, Rufus Wainwright, Roberto Roena, The Funky Meters, Allen Stone, Smokey Robinson Supporting Acts: Vetiver, LoCura, Monophonics, Ben l'Oncle Soul, Todd Sickafoose, Quartet San Francisco, Joe Bataan, Vieux Farka Touré
2013	Headliners: Pink Martini, Shuggie Otis, Fanfare Ciocarlia, Kronos Quartet, Geographer, Deltron 3030, Ramsey Lewis, Dee Dee Bridgewater, Michael McDonald Supporting Acts: La Santa Cecilia, The Relatives, Red Baraat, Magik*Magik Quartet, Real Vocal String Quartet, Dan the Automator, Del the Funky Homosapien, Kid Koala, Quadron, Boz Scaggs
2012	Headliners: OK Go, Al Jarreau and the George Duke Trio, Ozomatil, The E Family, Nitin Sawhney, Preservation Jazz Hall Band, Anita Baker Supporting Acts: The Family Crest, Mara Hruby, SMOD, Sheila E., Juan and Peter Michael Escovedo, Meshell Ndegocello, The Stone Foxes, The Family Stone, Glide Ensemble
2011	Headliners: Wil Campa, Aaron Neville, The English Beat, AfroCubism, Neko Case, Jazz Mafia Symphony, Sharon Jones Supporting Acts: Luisa Maita, Quinn DeVeaux, My First Earthquake, Pellejo Seco, The Dodos, Chali 2na, Ben l'Oncle Soul

== Digital ==
Stern Grove Festival's YouTube channel features concert videos and pre-concert talks that began with the 2006 Stern Grove Festival season.
