= Maya Americans =

Americans of Maya descent

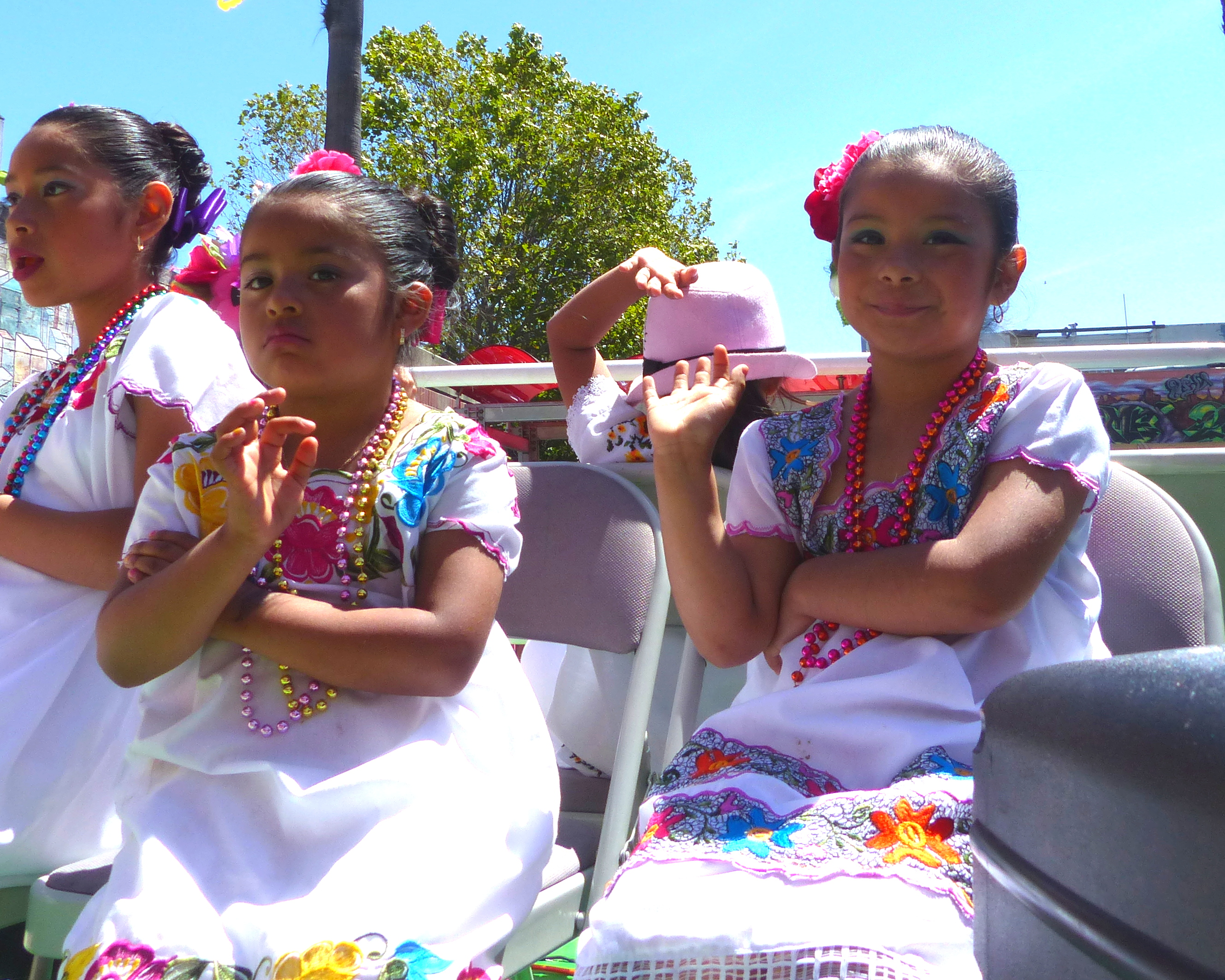
- Girls representing the Yucatec Maya organization Asociacion Mayab at San Francisco Carnaval, 2013.

Total population
- 500,000 (2011)

Regions with significant populations
- Mainly in Sunbelt, in places such as Los Angeles, San Francisco, Houston, or Indiantown

Languages
- Spanish; English; Mayan

Religion
- Predominantly Roman Catholic

Related ethnic groups
- Other Indigenous peoples of the Americas, Mexican Americans and Guatemalan Americans

Maya Americans are Americans of Maya descent. Most Maya Americans originate from western Guatemala and the Mexican state of Chiapas.

== History ==
=== Guatemalan civil war and reasons for migration ===
The Cold War led to the spread of Communist ideology in Latin America. The influence of Fidel Castro and the Cuban Revolution led to an uprising by the Guatemalan working class, Maya and peasant Ladino workers. These groups began forming left-wing factions and guerrilla groups like the MR-13, Guatemalan Party of Labor, and the EGP. This armed conflict was a result of a coup d'état supported by the CIA against the democratically elected government of Jacobo Árbenz in 1954. The Maya population of Guatemala found themselves caught in the crossfires of the Guatemalan Civil War from 1954 to 1996. During this time period, food shortages, political oppression, and violence led to the death of over 200,000 Guatemalan Maya. To combat Communist guerilla groups, the Guatemalan military issued the policy of Tierras Arrasadas, a scorched earth policy. The Guatemalan military raided areas suspected of revolutionary actions. The military burned the peasant villages and all their crops. This, combined with leftist-guerilla interaction with Indigenous peasants, led to famine and harsh economic conditions for the Maya peasant class. Waves of Maya emigrated to avoid military persecution, political instability, lack of opportunity, and natural disasters.

=== Waves of migration ===
The socioeconomic conditions of war triggered waves of mass migration of Mayas into the United States from 1970 to the end of the Guatemalan Civil War. Many Maya families were split up because the males of the household would move to America and remit money back home to Guatemala.

As the war continued, changes to immigration laws in the U.S. restricted Mayan's' ability to seek asylum. The Guatemalan Civil War was at its peak during the Reagan presidency and due to his anti-Communist doctrine, the administration rarely considered Guatemalan refugees for asylum since the policy was to refuse economic refugees from Communist countries.

The post-civil war migrants are mostly economic migrants.

Providence, Rhode Island, also became a prominent destination for many Maya people during the Guatemalan Civil War. In the early 1980s and 1990s, the Guatemalan population in Providence began to flourish. At first Providence was meant to only be a stop in order to reach Canada, where many Guatemalan migrants hoped to receive asylum. The Maya population in Providence continued to grow and many Maya migrants began participating in the Providence economy by starting small businesses and working for locals. However, there were Quiché-speaking Mayans who also migrated to Providence and their inability to speak English created language barriers when attempting to find employment.

== The Maya in North America ==
Maya-Americans are mostly found along the Sunbelt. They inhabit many cities like Los Angeles and Houston but they also occupy rural areas due to their agricultural roots. Many Maya migrants moved to poor neighborhoods in big cities which led to even more violence, resource shortages, and racial oppression. Most of the Maya immigrants are labor migrants therefore, they occupy a number of manual-labor positions. Also, migrant Maya deal with problems in communication and contacting relatives. The postal service in Guatemala is unreliable so many of Maya Americans must use special courier services to contact relatives. The United States Postal service only forwards mail to the Guatemala postal service. Therefore, Many Maya-Americans do not use it. Although some Maya were placed in crowded urban areas, they still own businesses such as restaurants, culture classes, and other sources of revenue. The communal aspect of Maya society is very strong as more majority Maya populations start to occupy more U.S. land and form their own means of sustenance for those economies. Other ethnic Maya formed settlements in agricultural societies like Indiantown, Florida. Indiantown is located in Martin County, Florida, and has a growing Latin American population. Most of this population consists of displaced Indigenous people with roots in Central America. Certain areas have larger Maya populations than others. Still, there are harsh economic conditions and less mobility due to language barriers and forced assimilation. The agricultural and communal background of Maya confines a large percentage of them to their communities. The generational gap of Maya migrants also shows the transition from different perspectives as we see third-generation migrants began to succeed in the factory setting rather than the rural settings. Although a large percent of Maya Americans still do farm, a large number of them are in more industrial settings. Factory life has been a staple in Maya Society in the United States.

Maya migrants who live in low economic conditions and speak limited amounts of English are often recruited to work in large factories. Low-skill factory jobs do not require English proficiency, often attracting many Maya individuals to join the factory industry. Despite the limited English proficiency necessary for these positions, language barriers still affect daily work life. Interpreters are often needed during orientation, and due to the various Mayan languages spoken, many individuals need help finding interpreters who speak Mayan languages. The average salaries for these factory positions are very low; however, these jobs allow some Maya Americans to remit money to Guatemala and support their families. A large portion of Nebraska's Maya population works in the meatpacking industry. In certain meatpacking factories in Nebraska, up to 95 percent of the employees are from Latinx and Hispanic backgrounds.

Most meatpacking factory line workers in Nebraska work 8–10 hours daily, and in 2012, the average salary was approximately $24,000. These factory positions are some of the only employment opportunities for Maya Americans in many rural areas. Manuela, a Guatemalan woman working in a Nebraska meatpacking factory, noted, "In Guatemala, there’s work, but it’s very low paid, and things are really expensive there. Here, when you work all week, you have money, and as much food as you want.” Although some Maya Americans earn higher wages than they once did in Guatemala and other countries from which they migrated, these jobs still have very low wages and require long hours and immense amounts of physical labor, leading to these factories having significant employee turnover rates. Once these workers leave their factory positions, they typically have to find new employment at nearby factories. Local advocates in Nebraska volunteer to help Maya workers navigate employment opportunities and guide Maya individuals through the United States citizenship and green card process to help them prosper in the United States.

== Culture ==
The conditions that influenced the waves of Guatemalan migration caused for the forced migration of the Maya people. Some Maya would consider themselves as displaced refugees who have a hard time of assimilating into the American culture. The process of forced assimilation leads to Maya forming more exclusive migrant communities on U.S. soil. The cultural transition is far too complicated to make for some migrants. Another problem facing Maya Americans is distinction and categorization. Mayan dialect is different from regular Spanish and this leads to more problems in schools, work, and recreational life for Maya Americans. The Mays speak a large range of dialects and languages. Some speak Spanish and others speak Mam, Yucatec, Kekchi, or other languages. Processing of their immigration papers is more difficult due to the specificity of their cultural distinction. The immigration system largely lumps Maya with other Latin Americans rather than recognizing their ethnic distinctiveness. Identity issues for Maya Americans have always been a barrier for ethnic Maya. In relative terms, Guatemalans immigrants are a small proportion of Latin American immigrants in the US so their identity in America is relatively unknown compared to other racial groups and ethnicities. Traditional village and family structures are still prevalent among Maya in the United States. This sometimes proves to be problematic in Maya communities and especially in the workplace. These hierarchal systems put in place are oftentimes challenged by the separate hierarchies of workplaces.

Maya Indigenous roots prove to be strong because most Maya Americans live in Maya and predominantly Latinx communities. Outside of their communities, many museums have had exhibits that showcase Indigenous Maya artwork and artifacts and provide information for the broader community to learn about the Maya people. For instance, the California Science Center created an exhibition called Maya: The Exhibition which presented a variety of Maya artifacts and interactive educational experiences. Additionally, there is a significant cultural sphere of influence in places where Maya sought refuge. In Los Angeles, The Mayan Theater was once seen as a revival of Maya architecture and art. In the 1990s, the theater was deemed a historical monument. Maya culture is still being used for financial gain in many other areas. Specifically, Maya culture is utilized in the nightlife entertainment industry, where many nightclubs use Maya-themed decorations and references. Examples of these nightclubs include the Maya Lagoon, which is a lucrative nightclub located in Houston, and The Mayan located in Los Angeles.

Various organizations are dedicated to preserving Maya culture and provide resources for Maya Americans. The Mayan League is run by multiple Maya individuals who aim to preserve Maya legacies. The Mayan League also advocates for immigration reform policies and has helped Maya Individuals access language services at the United States and Mexican border. Many Maya migrants from Guatemala require interpreters at the border, and the Mayan League recruits interpreters who speak various Mayan languages to help individuals during the immigration process to become United States citizens. The Mayan League also advocates for Indigenous women's rights and protection. Another popular advocacy group is Prima-veral Inc., a United States-based non-profit organization that aims to aid Guatemalan migrants and Maya individuals in Washington, DC, and Guatemala. Prima-veral has completed various projects, including building homes in Guatemala, delivering wheelchairs to children, and helping individuals during the immigration process.

== The role of United States remittances in Guatemala ==
Remittance is broadly defined as sums of money that are often sent from one country to another. Many Maya people living in the United States often remit money to Guatemala for various reasons, including providing for their families. Due to the low wages and limited job opportunities in Guatemala, many individuals choose to migrate to the United States, annually, 9 out of 10 individuals leave Guatemala because of these reasons. In 2021, it was reported that remittances from the United States to Guatemala surpassed $15.3 billion, which was the largest amount of remittances recorded in history and made up approximately 17.8% of the Guatemalan economy. According to the Inter-American Development Bank (IDB), only a small percentage of Guatemalan migrants choose to stay in the United States for a long period; approximately only one-fifth of migrants end up living in the United States for an extended period of time.

Once money is remitted from the United States to Guatemala, only a small percentage goes towards investment or savings. The U.N Economic Commission for Latin America collected surveys in Southern Guatemala and concluded that 57.1% of remittances are used for consumption, while only 5.4% of the remittances are saved or invested. In order to increase savings, many organizations have developed within Guatemala to implement financial education and literacy programs. The Inter-American Dialogue, with the help of partners that include but are not limited to the Cities Alliance, UN funded coalition on urban poverty, and the United States Agency for International Development, has worked on establishing financial education programs since 2016. These programs have created over $2.4 million worth of savings and run in over 30 Guatemalan towns where migration to the United States is popular. Financial educators target banks where people deposit the remittances they receive and assist Guatemalan individuals in making financial decisions.

Money remitted from the United States to Guatemala is also used to build homes, according to the U.N Economic Commission for Latin America, 8.2% of the money is spent on building homes in Southern Guatemala. Many of these homes are built in Quetzaltenango, Guatemala, these homes are considered to be “remittance architecture,” which are homes that are paid with remittances. These homes often differ from the local architecture style, are usually larger, and have more modern infrastructure. Overall, money remitted from the United States by Maya and Guatemalan migrants plays a large role in the Guatemalan economy and drives a significant amount of Maya individuals to migrate to the United States.
