= Holly Park (San Francisco) =

Park in California, United States

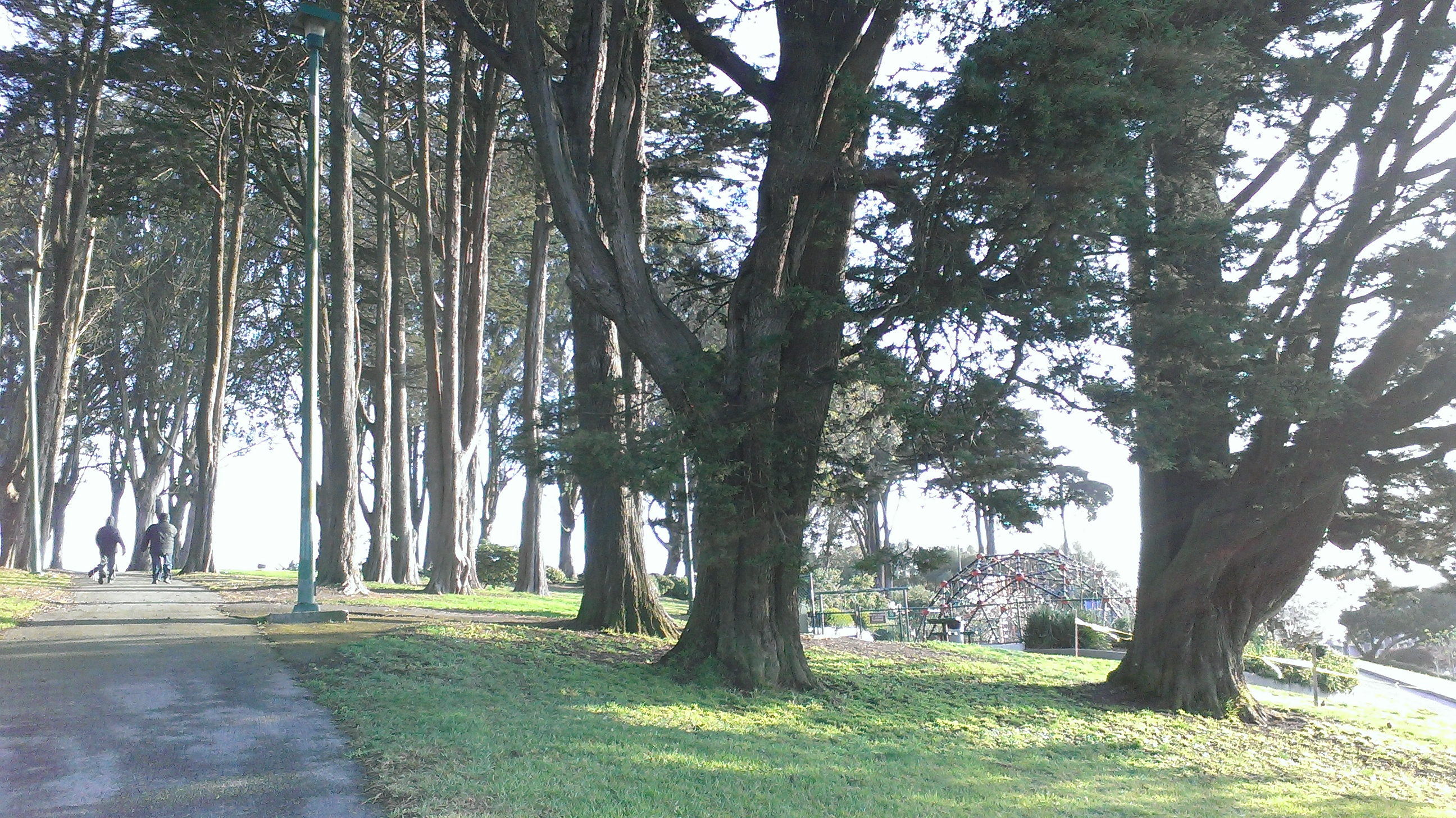
- Interactive map of Holly Park
- Type: Municipal (San Francisco)
- Location: San Francisco
- Coordinates: 37°44′14″N 122°25′15″W
- Area: 8.15 acres (3.30 ha)
- Created: 1920s
- Status: Open all year

Holly Park is a public park in San Francisco, California in the Bernal Heights neighborhood. It is known for excellent views of the city and San Francisco Bay.

One of San Francisco's oldest city parks, it was donated to the city in 1862, by James Graham Fair, from a parcel that had been part of the Bernal land grant, also known as the Rancho Rincon de las Salinas y Potrero Viejo. The land was then improved in the 1920s, with help from the city parks department and increased city planning and funding from the 1950s onward. It has walking paths around the summit of Holly Hill, nature walk signs, public art, picnic areas, basketball and tennis courts, gardens, and a children's playground.

The kinetic sculpture Odonatoa by Joyce Hsu is in the park near the playground.

The name of the park, and of Holly Hill, may be related to the hollyleaf cherry or Islais cherry, once abundant near Islais Creek just to the south of the hill.
