= Sigmund Stern Recreation Grove =

Park in Western San Francisco known for hosting the Stern Grove Festival

- Stern Grove
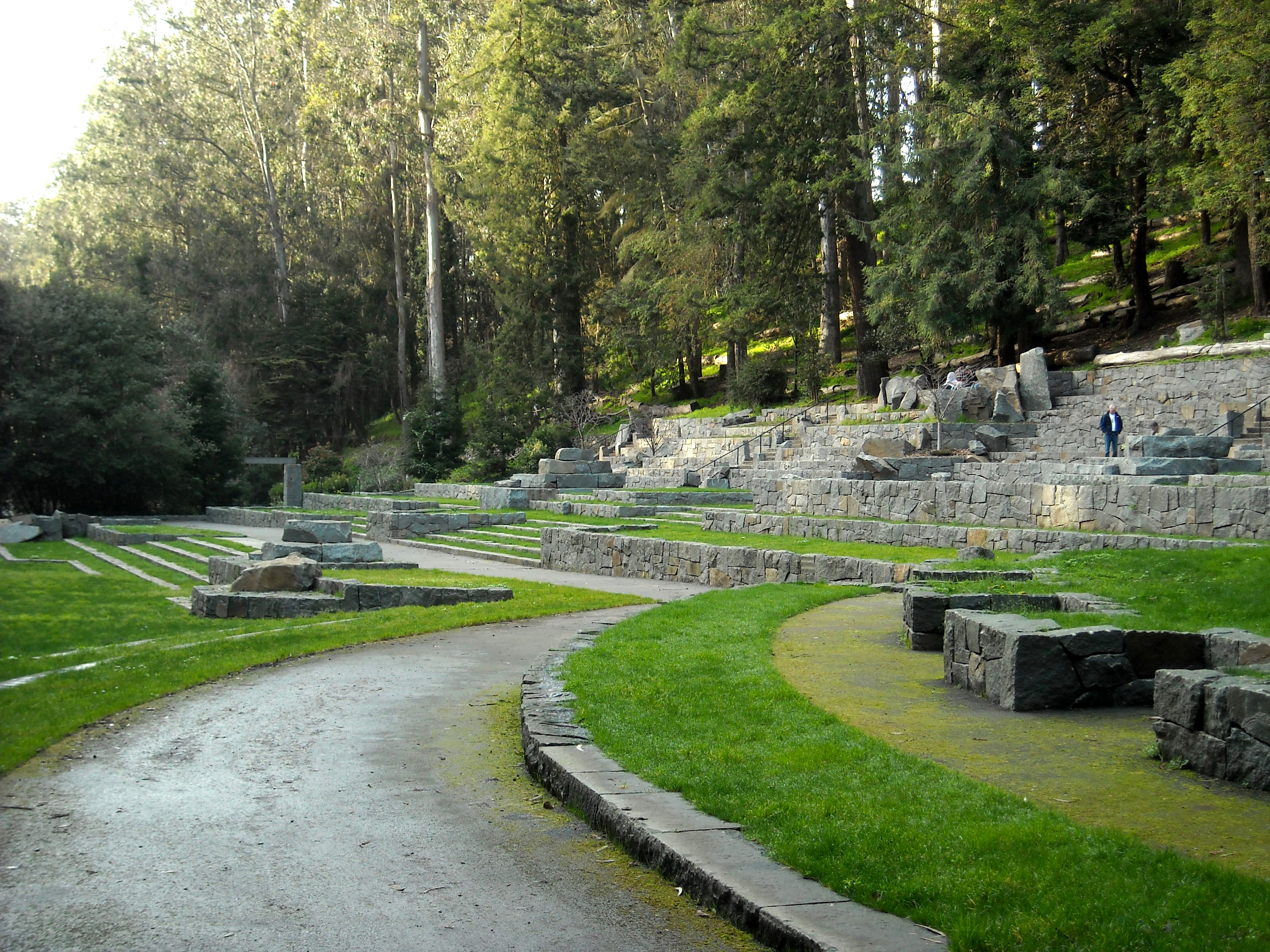
- image of Sigmund Stern Recreation Grove
- Interactive map of Sigmund Stern Recreation Grove
- Location: San Francisco
- Coordinates: 37.7362°N 122.4776°W
- Area: 33 acres (13 ha)
- Created: 1931
- Operator: SF Recreation and Parks Department
- Status: Always open
- Public transit: St. Francis Circle station
- Website: sfrecpark.org/Facilities/Facility/Details/Sigmund-Stern-Grove-375

Sigmund Stern Recreation Grove, locally called Stern Grove, is a 33-acre (130,000 m^{2}) recreational site located on the West Side of the city of San Francisco California USA in the Parkside District. It is administered by the city's Recreation and Parks Department and is the concert setting for the Stern Grove Festival, which has taken place annually since 1938.

== History ==
The site, along Sloat Boulevard between 19th and 34th Avenues about two miles (3 km) south of the Golden Gate Park, was donated to the city in 1931 by Rosalie Meyer Stern. She was the daughter of Marc Eugene Meyer, who named the park for her late husband Sigmund Stern, a philanthropist, nephew of Levi Strauss, and son of David Stern.

The original Stern Grove landscaping and facilities were built by the Works Progress Administration. It consists of several park sections including the Concert Meadow, the West Meadow, and Pine Lake Park. The grove's Pine Lake is one of three natural lakes in the city of San Francisco. In 2005, Stern Grove underwent a $15 million renovation, designed by landscape architect Lawrence Halprin. New features included drainage improvements and erosion control, an expanded outdoor stage and performance facilities, and terraces and additional bleacher-style seating, built of stone walls, along the slope opposite the stage.

Since 1932, the Stern Grove Music Festival has presented weekly concerts and performances in the outdoor amphitheater during the summer months. Supported entirely by contributions, the concerts have always been free to the public. Crowds have often exceeded 20,000 people.

In early 2023, a clubhouse known as the Trocadero House was destroyed due to a tree falling on it. Later, the Parks and Recreation department sent repair crews to repair the damaged house. It was restored and reopened in 2025.

In February 2025, a large eucalyptus tree fell due to a storm, which caused the large entrance sign to fall over and closed the upper entrance to the public for a few weeks. The park reopened in March. As of April, the sign has not been replaced, likely to save funds.

== See also ==
- Trocadero, San Francisco
- Parks in San Francisco, California
- Project Insight
