= SMOD =

Malian musical band

- Origin: Mali
- Genres: Hip-Hop, Rap, Folk, Traditional Malian music, Bhangra
- Years active: 2000 – present
- Members: Sam; Ousco; Donsky
- Past members: Mouzy
- Website: smod.fr

SMOD is a Malian musical band established in 2000 made up originally of Sam, Mouzy, Ousco and Donsky. The name of the band is an acronym of their first names. Mouzy eventually left the band to pursue a solo career in France. Their music is a mix of rap, hip hop, folk and traditional music. Smod is also a common pet name given to a loved one

== Career ==
Sam is the son of the blind Malian musical duo Amadou & Mariam. He was also a school mate of Donsky. After Ouscou and Mouzy joined in, they formed SMOD (S for Sam, M for Mouzy, O for Ousco and D for Donsky).

SMOD's debut album was in 2002 entitled Dunia Kuntala (meaning the course of life) produced the music manager of Amadou & Mariam, a blind Malian famous duo. Sam is the son of the couple. This was followed in 2004 by the album Ta i tola (meaning come on). In this album, they cooperated with Amadou & Mariam, Manu Chao, King Massassi and Kisto Dem. The same year they won a golden disc for their song "Politic Amagni" (meaning politics is not good) taken from Amadou & Mariam album Dimanche à Bamako (meaning Sunday in Bamako in French).

In 2005, their music video "Dakan" directed by Fabrice Brovelli remains very popular broadcast on Malian television. They have been featured in African Cup of Nations event and in a number of Malian and international festivals and give around 50 concerts a year in Mali. SMOD started touring Europe in 2008, supporting Touré Kinda, Matthieu Chedid, Tiken Jah Fakoly, Salif Keita, Amadou and Mariam, Oumou Sangare and Manu Chao amongst many others.

For their third self-titled album in 2010 called SMOD, they collaborated with Manu Chao who produced the album and was recorded in Mali and France. The first release from the album was "Ça chante". Other public favourites from the album include "Ambola" and "Les dirigeants africains" (meaning the African leaders in French). As a result, they became well known in France and in world music.

== Discography ==
=== Albums ===
- 2002: Dunia Kuntala
- 2004: Ta i tola
- 2010: SMOD (produced by Manu Chao)
  - Track list
1. Les dirigeants africains (3:58)
2. "Ça chante" (3:03)
3. "Tidjidja" (3:46)
4. "Simbala" (3:03)
5. "Ambola" (3:09)
6. "Les jeunes filles du Maliba" (3:58)
7. "J'ai pas peur du micro" (3:22)
8. "Reviens Djarabi" (3:13)
9. "Dakan" (2:49)
10. "Fenkoro" (3:44)
11. "Nedetado" (3:03)
12. "Problemes dans ma tête" (3:51)
13. "Fitri waleya" (5:14)

=== Singles ===
- 2005: "Dakan"
- 2009: "Ça chante"
