= Francisco Park =

Public park in San Francisco, California, United States

- Francisco Park from above on October 2026
- Interactive map of Francisco Park
- Location: San Francisco, California, United States
- Coordinates: 37°48′14″N 122°25′16″W
- Area: 4.5 acres (1.8 ha)
- Established: April 27, 2022
- Operator: San Francisco Recreation & Parks Department

Francisco Park is a 4.5-acre (1.8 ha) public park in the Russian Hill neighborhood in San Francisco, California, on the site of a former reservoir. The accessible park has a large lawn, a community garden, a playground, and a dog run. It opened in 2022. It has sweeping views of the San Francisco Bay.

== History ==
The Francisco Reservoir, the first in San Francisco, was established on the site in 1860 and was decommissioned in 1940 following the establishment of the Lombard Street reservoir, and shut down in 1966. The property then sat unused until 2014, when the city Board of Supervisors voted to hand over the property from the utility district to the city's Recreation and Parks Department. The park was then built by Francisco Park Conservancy, a nonprofit organization supported by the donations from the neighbors and community, and finally gifted to the City in 2022. It opened on April 27, 2022, and was the largest public park opened in the city since 1983.

== Description ==
The park is located on Bay Street between Larkin and Hyde Streets. It covers 4.5-acre (1.8 ha) and rises to an oval lawn. It includes a children's playground, a dog run, a community garden, picnic areas and a public restroom. A fenced-off section of the hillside has been left covered with natural vegetation, and another has been planted with drought-tolerant vegetation. The park preserves a section of the former reservoir and has a donated wrought iron fence from Collis Potter Huntington's Nob Hill mansion. A 450-foot (140 m) accessible staircase leads from the entrance on Hyde Street, and the pathway from Bay Street through the park is also accessible.
