= Pine Lake (San Francisco) =

Lake in the state of California, United States

- Laguna Puerca; Pig Lake
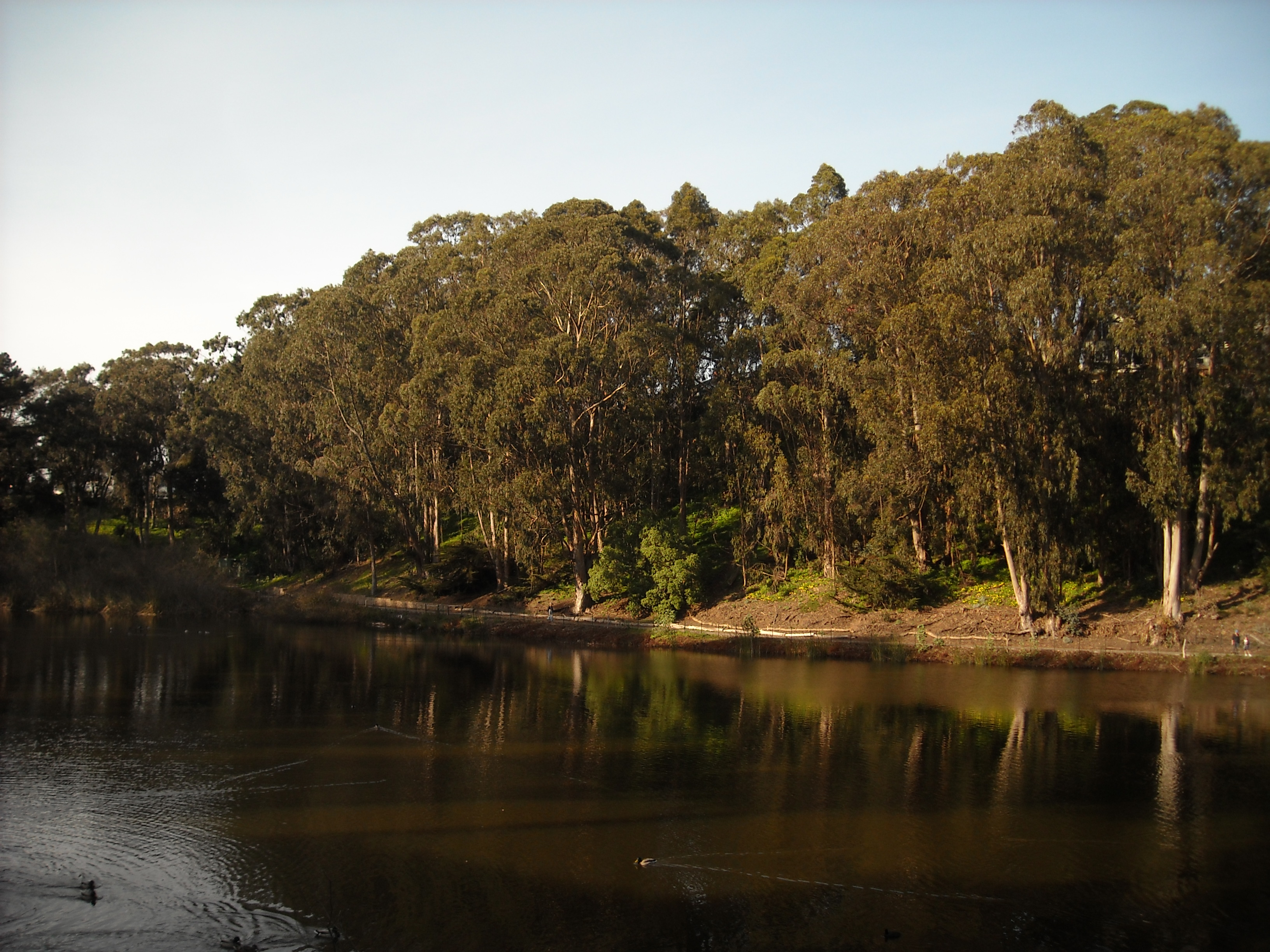
- Pine Lake in 2010

- Location within California Location within the United States
- Location: Pine Lake Park, San Francisco, California
- Coordinates: 37°44′10″N 122°29′20″W
- Basin countries: United States
- Surface elevation: 13 m (43 ft)

Pine Lake, previously known as Laguna Puerca or Pig Lake, is a freshwater lake in Pine Lake Park on the West Side of San Francisco. The lake is fed from the same aquifer as nearby Lake Merced.

== History ==
The surrounding area and lake, then known as Laguna Puerca or Pig Lake, were purchased by the Greene family following their move from Maine to San Francisco in 1847. The lake was purchased by the City of San Francisco in the five years following the nearby Sigmund Stern Recreation Grove.

== Ecology ==
The lake is fed by an underground spring, which also feeds nearby Lake Merced. It is surrounded by willows, tules, and aquatic plants. Migratory birds along the Pacific Flyway stop to feed, rest, or inhabit the surrounding area. The only natural freshwater lakes in San Francisco are Pine Lake, Lake Merced, and Mountain Lake.

== See also ==
- List of lakes in California
- List of lakes in the San Francisco Bay Area
