= Cayuga Park =

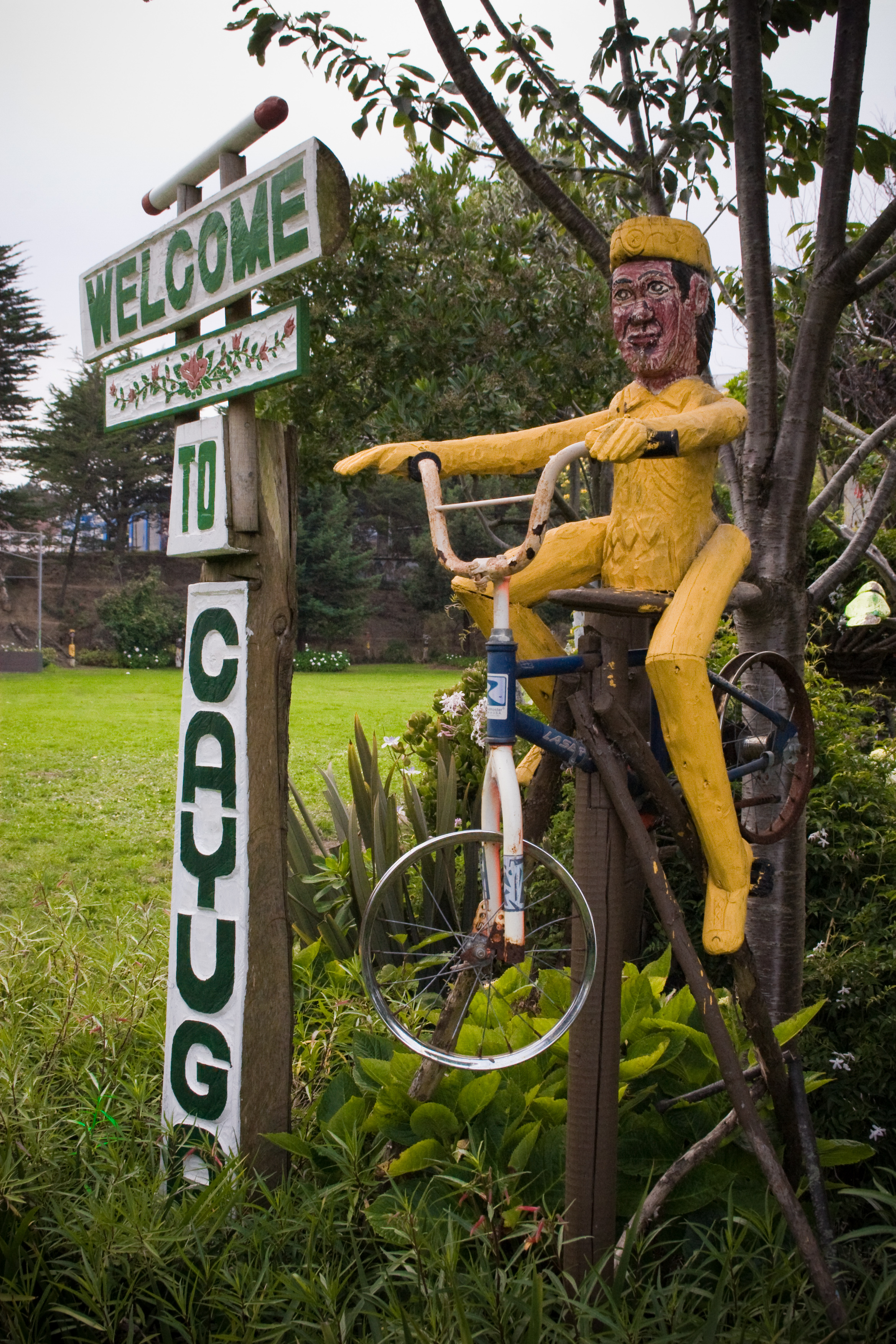
- Cayuga Park welcome sign
- Interactive map of Cayuga Park
- Location: San Francisco, California
- Coordinates: 37°42′50″N 122°27′1″W
- Operated by: San Francisco Recreation & Parks Department

Cayuga Park is a neighborhood park and playground in San Francisco, at the edge of the Cayuga Terrace neighborhood. Its history, location and aesthetics make it unique among the parks of San Francisco.

== History ==
In 1986, Demetrio Braceros was assigned to the 4-acre (16,000 m^{2}) Cayuga Park, with the mission to "change the atmosphere." He created and installed the landscape art present around the park.

In 2009, Eric Powell was commissioned to create the Cayuga Portal steel art sculpture introduced in 2013.

== Amenities ==
The park features an accessible children's playground, picnic area, community rooms, bathrooms, outdoor basketball court, outdoor tennis courts, and a multipurpose turf area with a baseball field.

== Public art installations ==
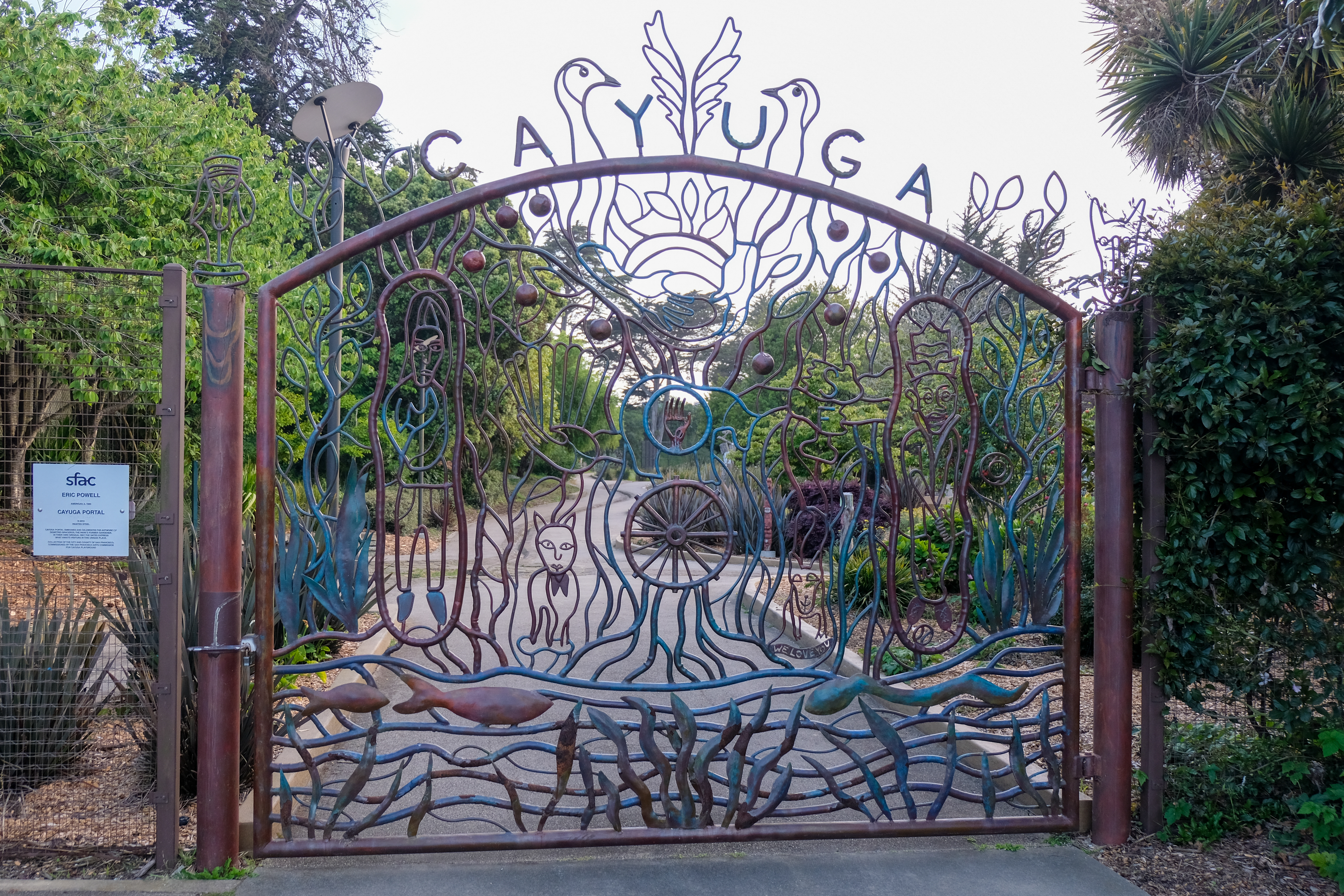
Cayuga Portal in May 2023.

=== Cayuga Portal ===
The entrance gates to the park were recreated as a painted steel public art installation by Eric Powell. It was commissioned in 2009 and unveiled in 2013.

=== Landscape art ===
The aesthetics of Cayuga Park is largely the creation of Demetrio Braceros, an employee of the San Francisco Recreation and Park Department. Braceros worked on the park for over 20 years, transforming a barren landscape into a park that features lush vegetation, trails, "themed gardens" and, most prominently, over 375 figurines, totem poles and statues as well as several observation decks, all carved from wood by Braceros.

After emigrating from the Philippines in 1973, Braceros worked for a San Francisco law firm but soon applied for a job as a gardener at the Recreation and Park Department. In 1986, Braceros was assigned to the park with the mission to "change the atmosphere."

Braceros said about the state of the park when he took it on, "there were prostitutes, drug dealers and crime. People got killed up there ... I thought to myself, how can I help this place?"

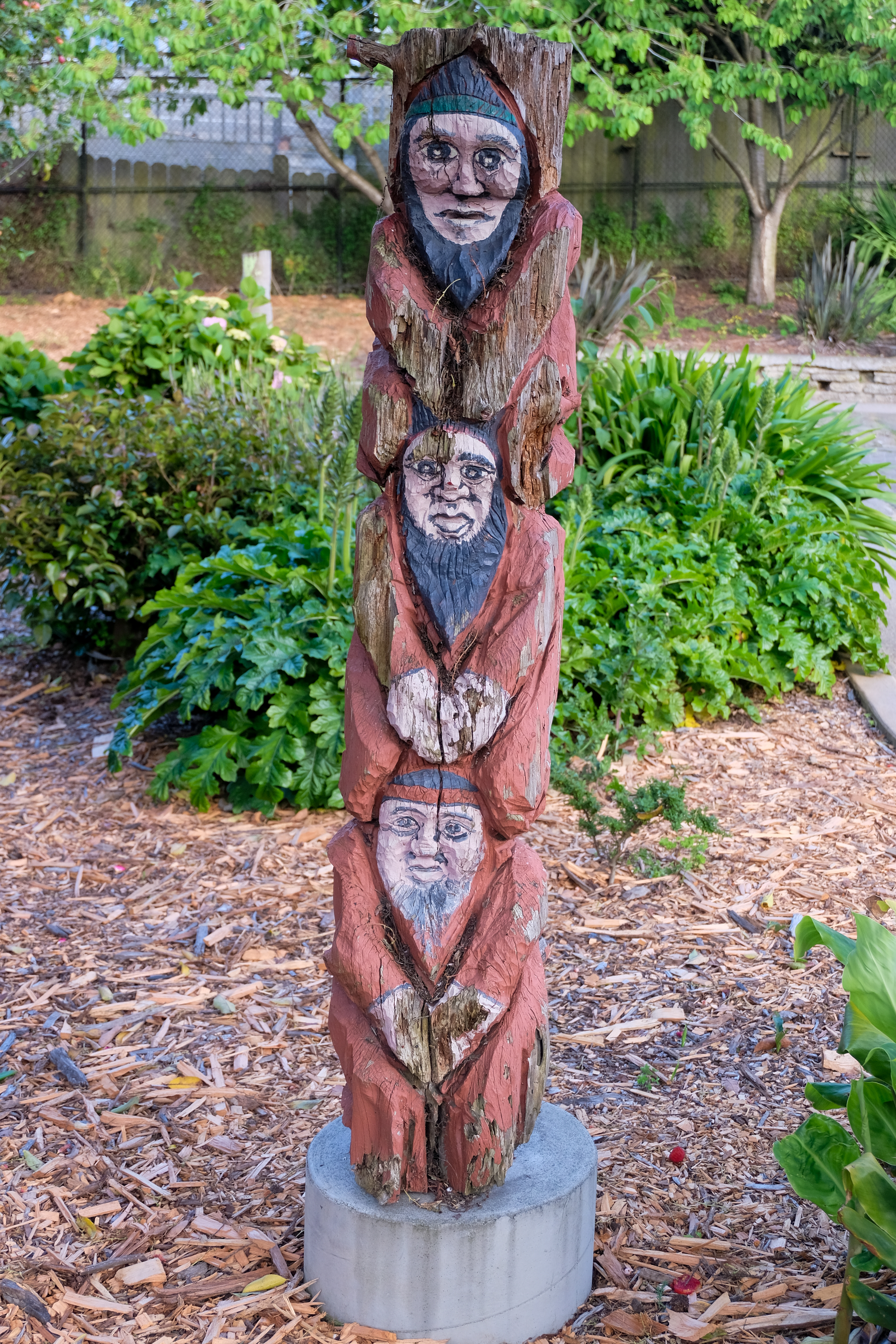

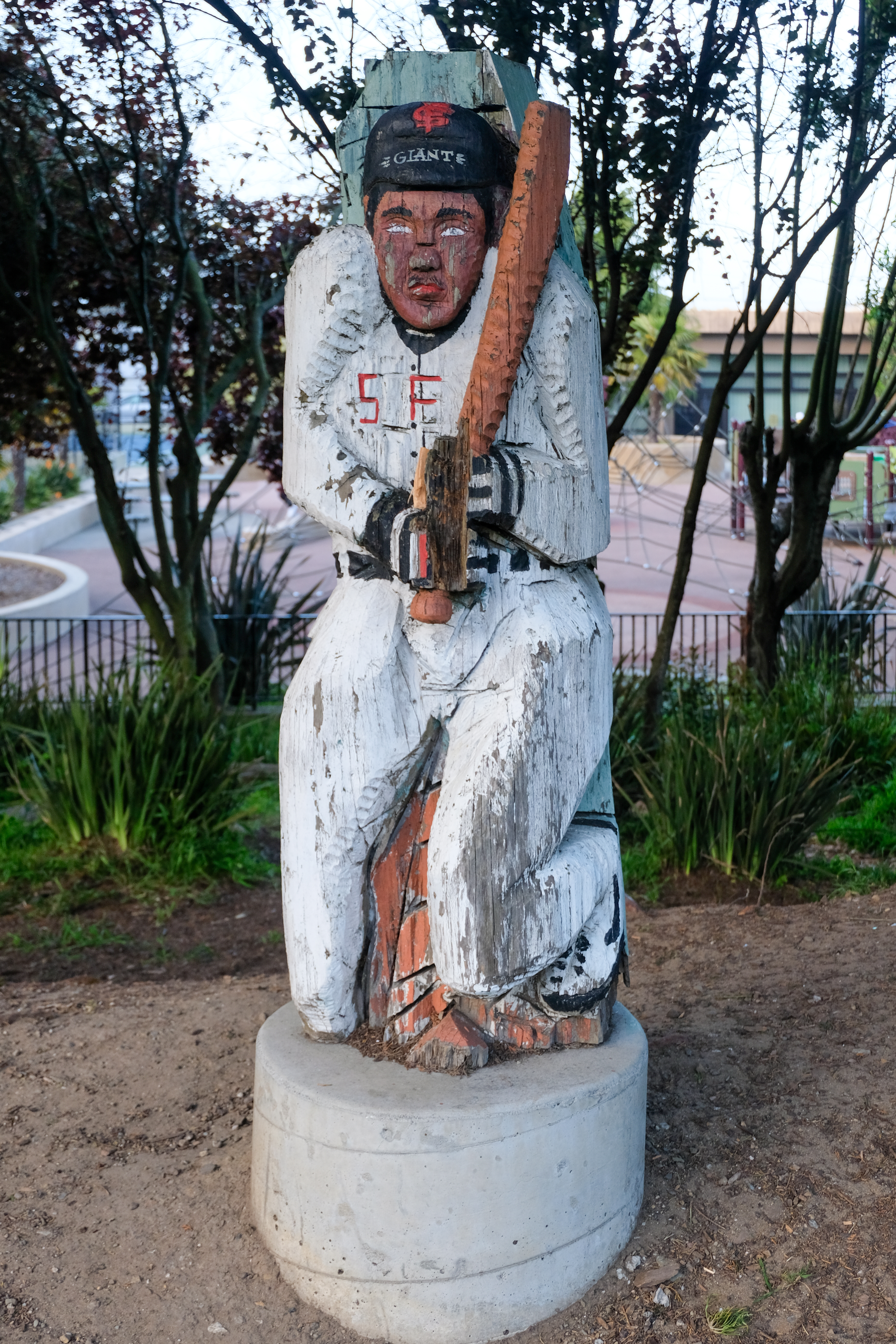

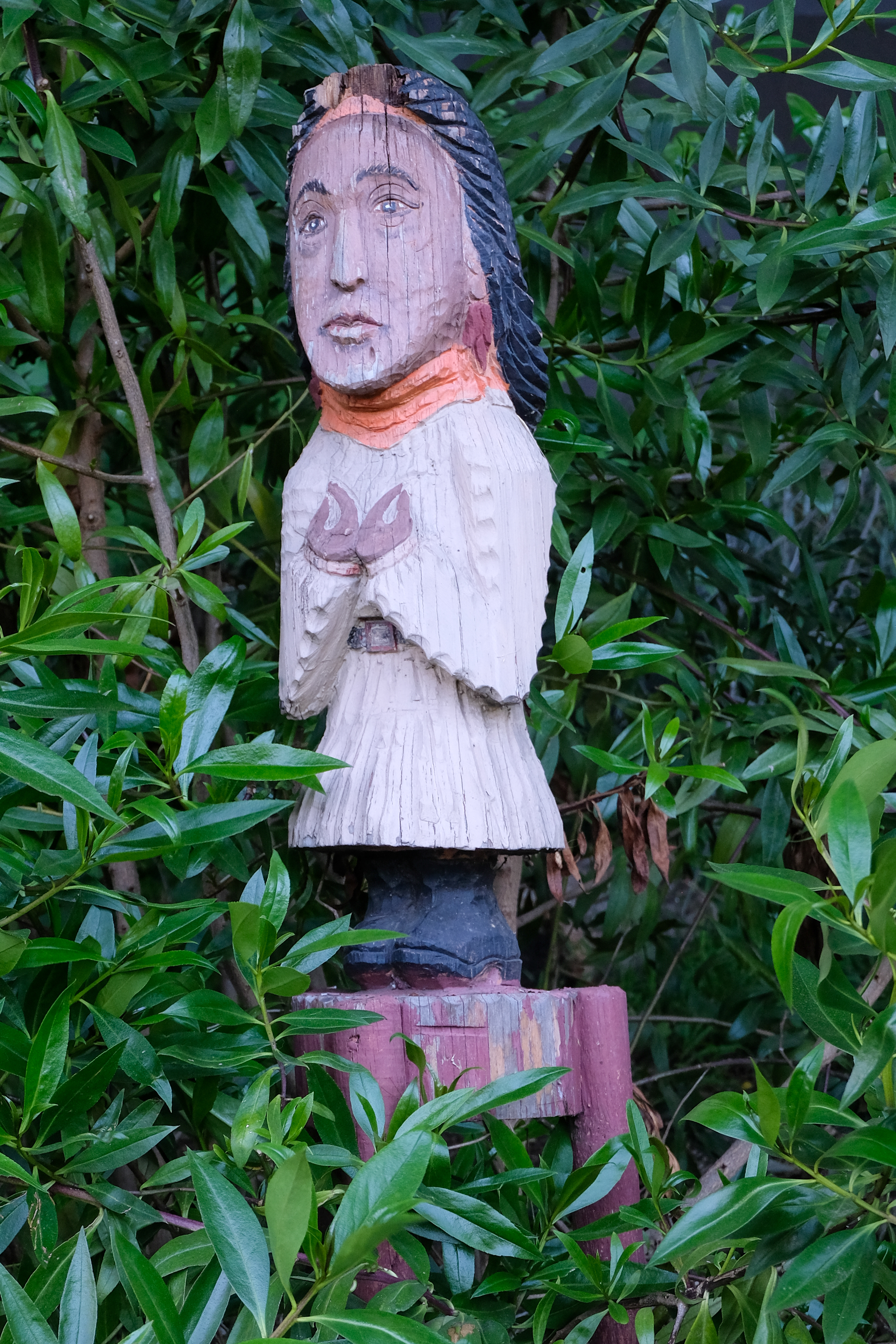

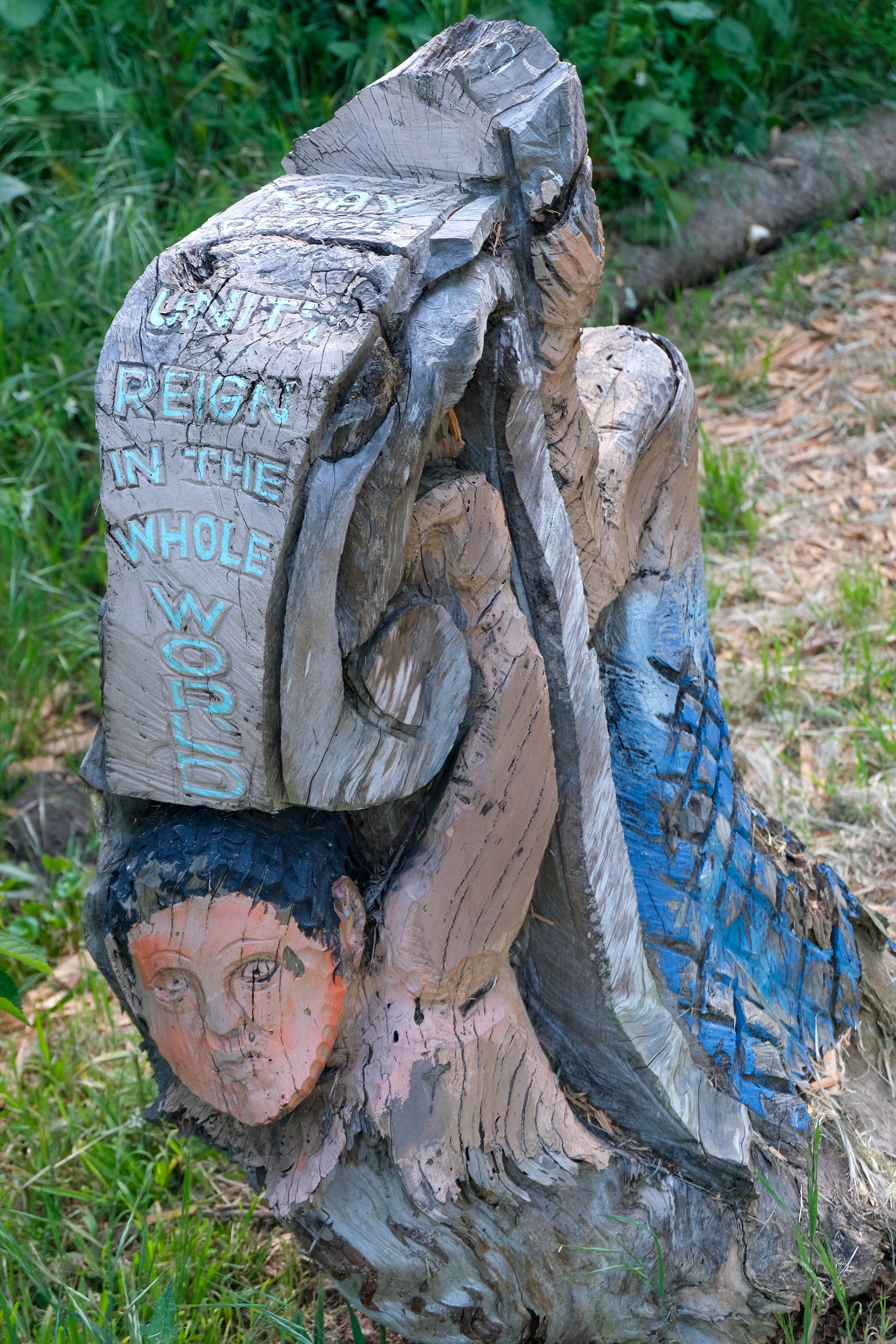

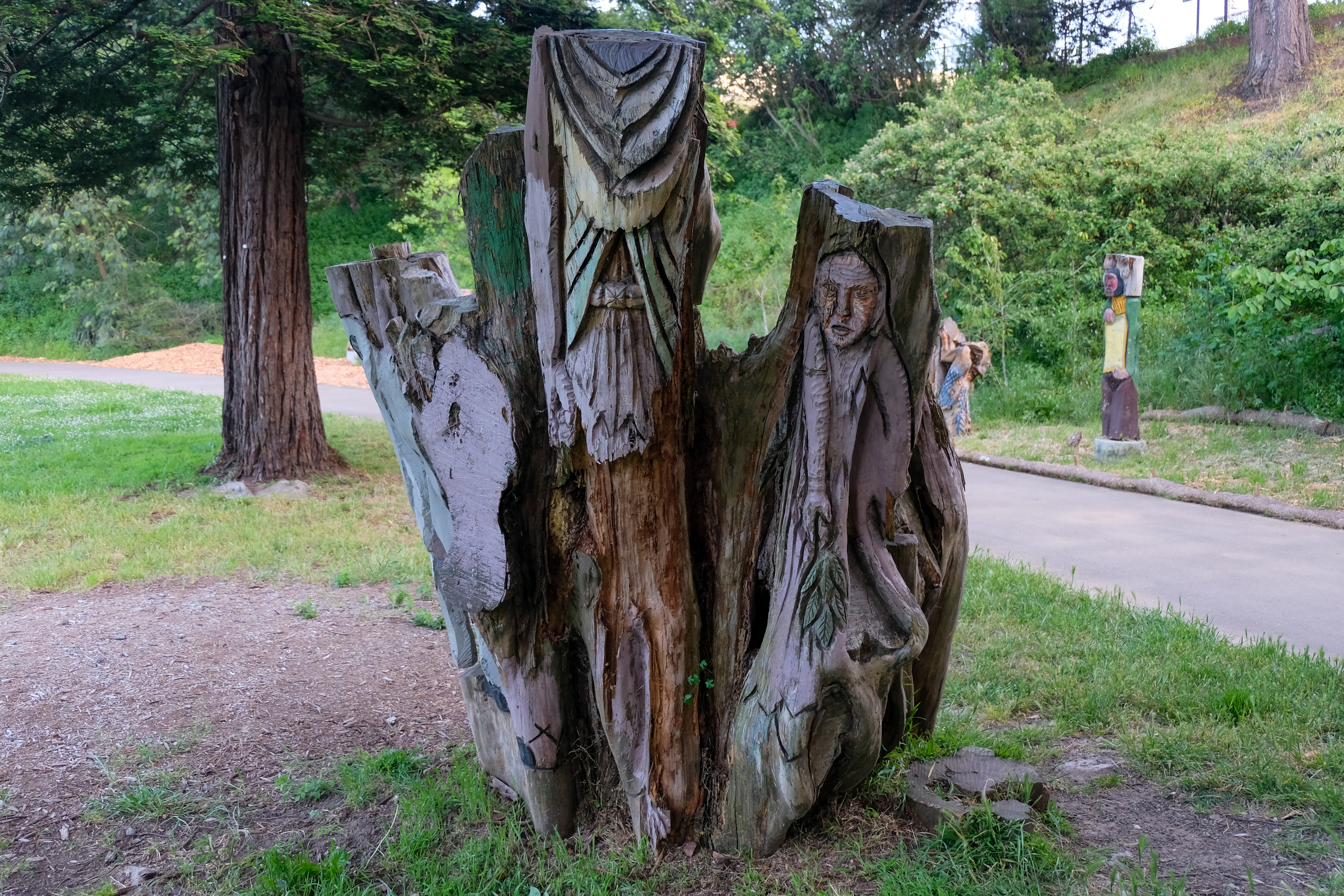

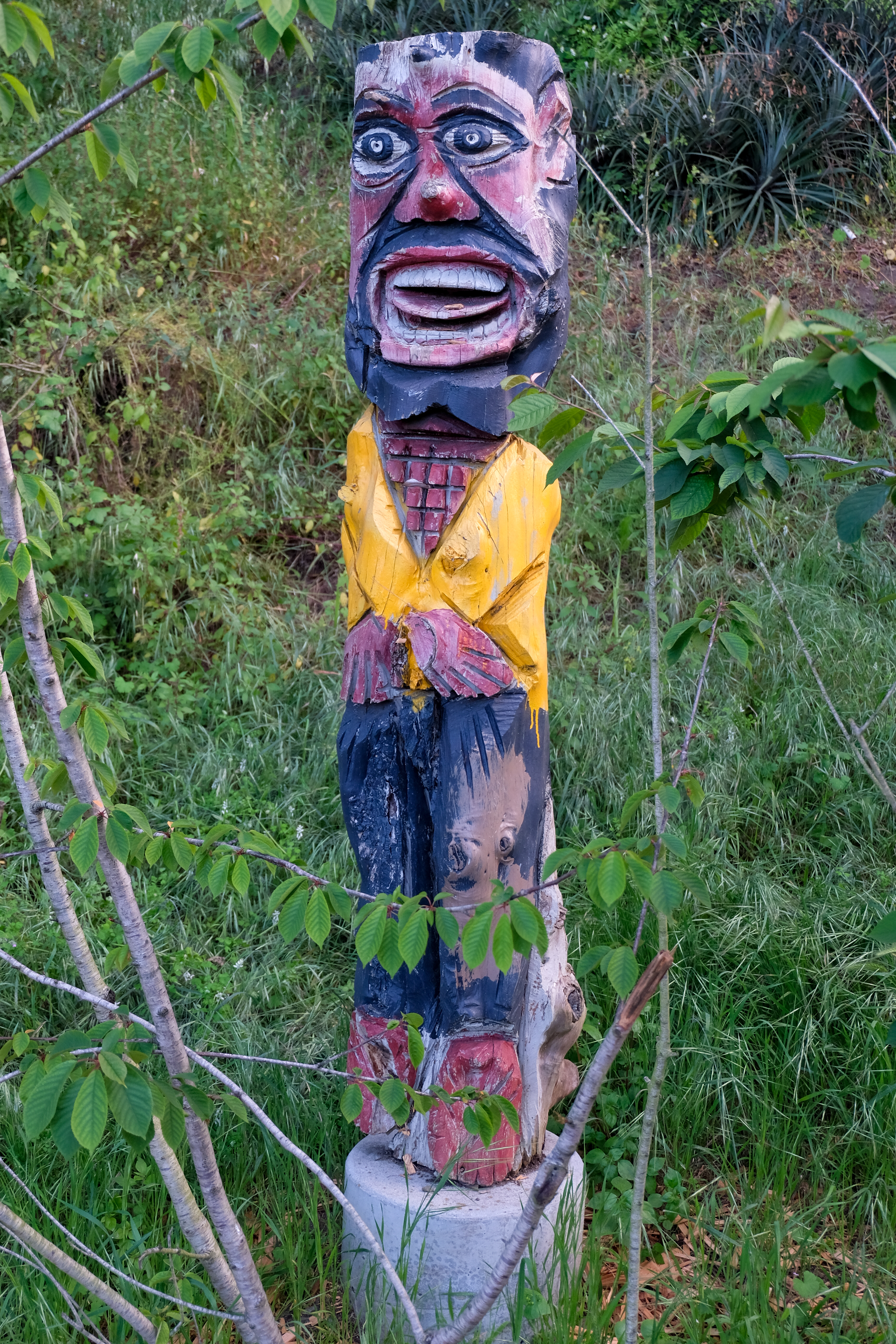

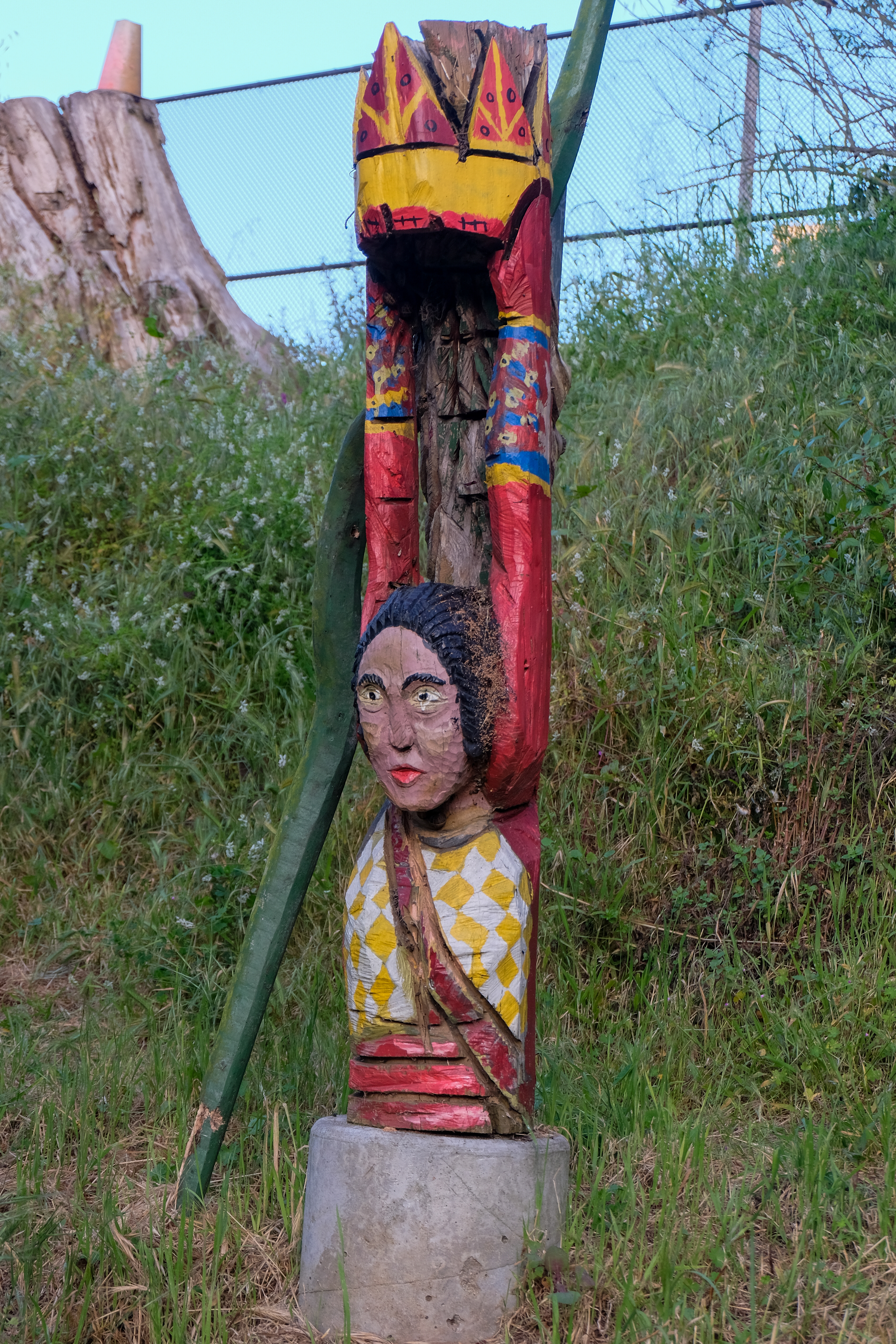

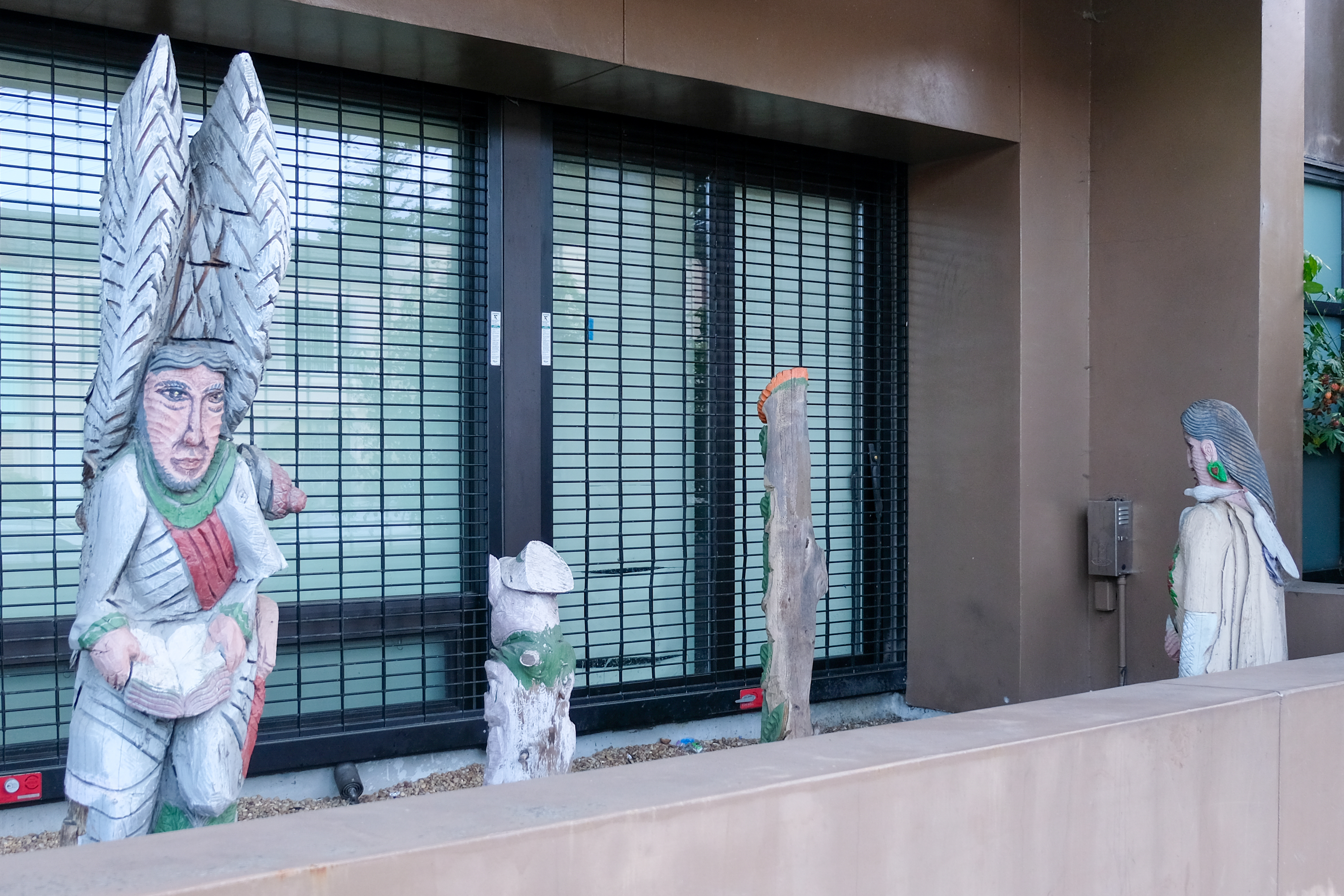
