= Mark Cavagnero =

American architect

- Born: July 7, 1957 (age 69); USA
- Occupation: Architect
- Awards: AIACC 2010 Distinguished Practice Award, AIACC 2015 Maybeck Award
- Practice: Mark Cavagnero Associates
- Projects: SFJAZZ Center, Oakland Museum of California, Legion of Honor

Mark Cavagnero, FAIA (born July 7, 1957) is an American architect and the founder of Mark Cavagnero Associates.

His works include SFJAZZ Center, in San Francisco, California; the major expansion of the Oakland Museum of California, originally designed by architect Kevin Roche; and the 1995 major renovation of the Legion of Honor museum with Edward Larrabee Barnes.

== Career ==
Cavagnero’s career began in 1983 in the New York City office of Edward Larrabee Barnes; his mentorship under Barnes profoundly influenced how he would practice. In 1988, Cavagnero moved to San Francisco and co-founded Barnes and Cavagnero with John Barnes (son of Edward Larrabee Barnes). In 1993, the firm became Mark Cavagnero Associates, providing a full range of architectural design services focused on cultural, commercial, education, and civic projects.

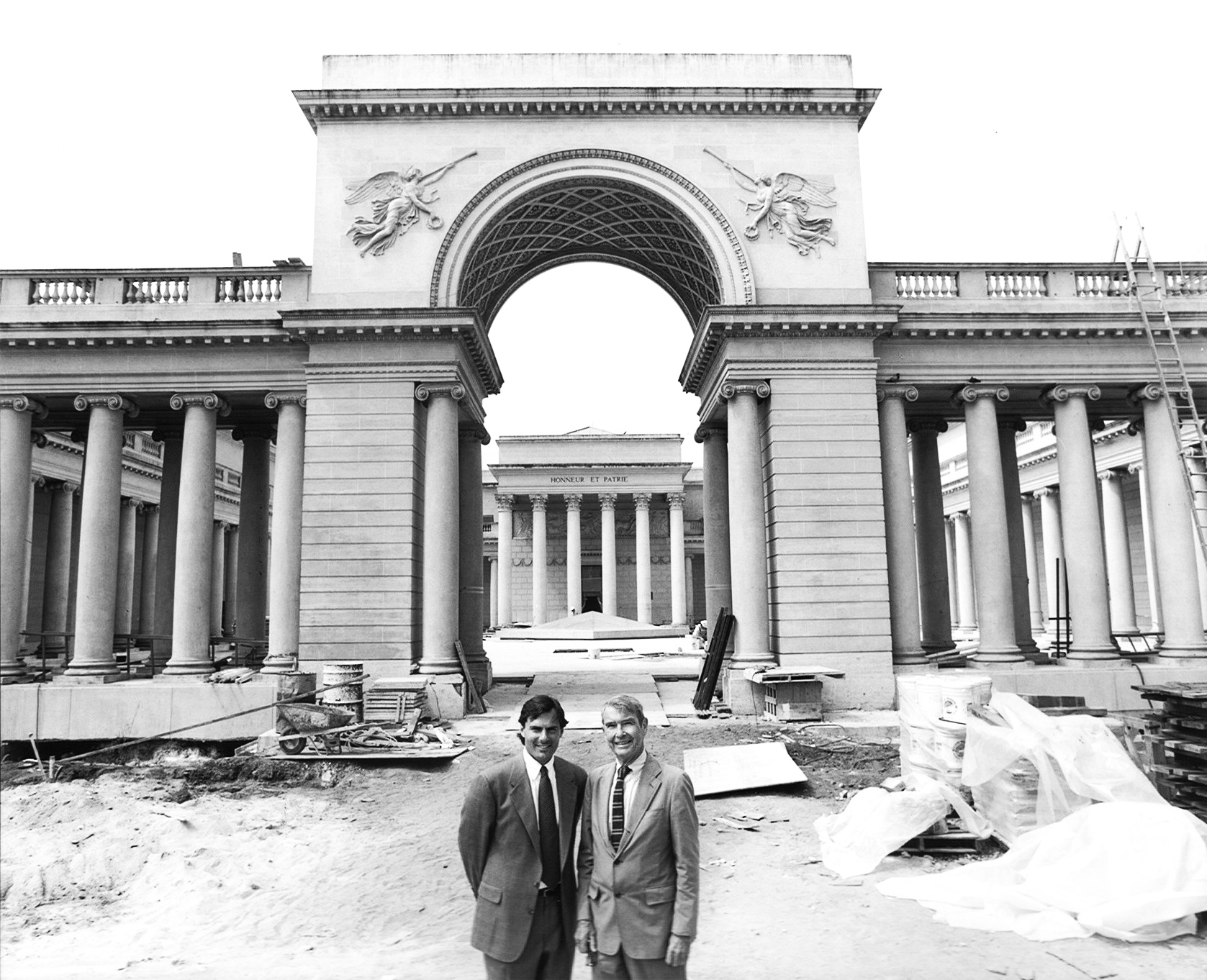
Architects Edward Larrabee Barnes and Mark Cavagnero. The 1995 Legion of Honor "major renovation that included seismic strengthening, building systems upgrades, restoration of historic architectural features, and an underground expansion that added 35,000 square feet."

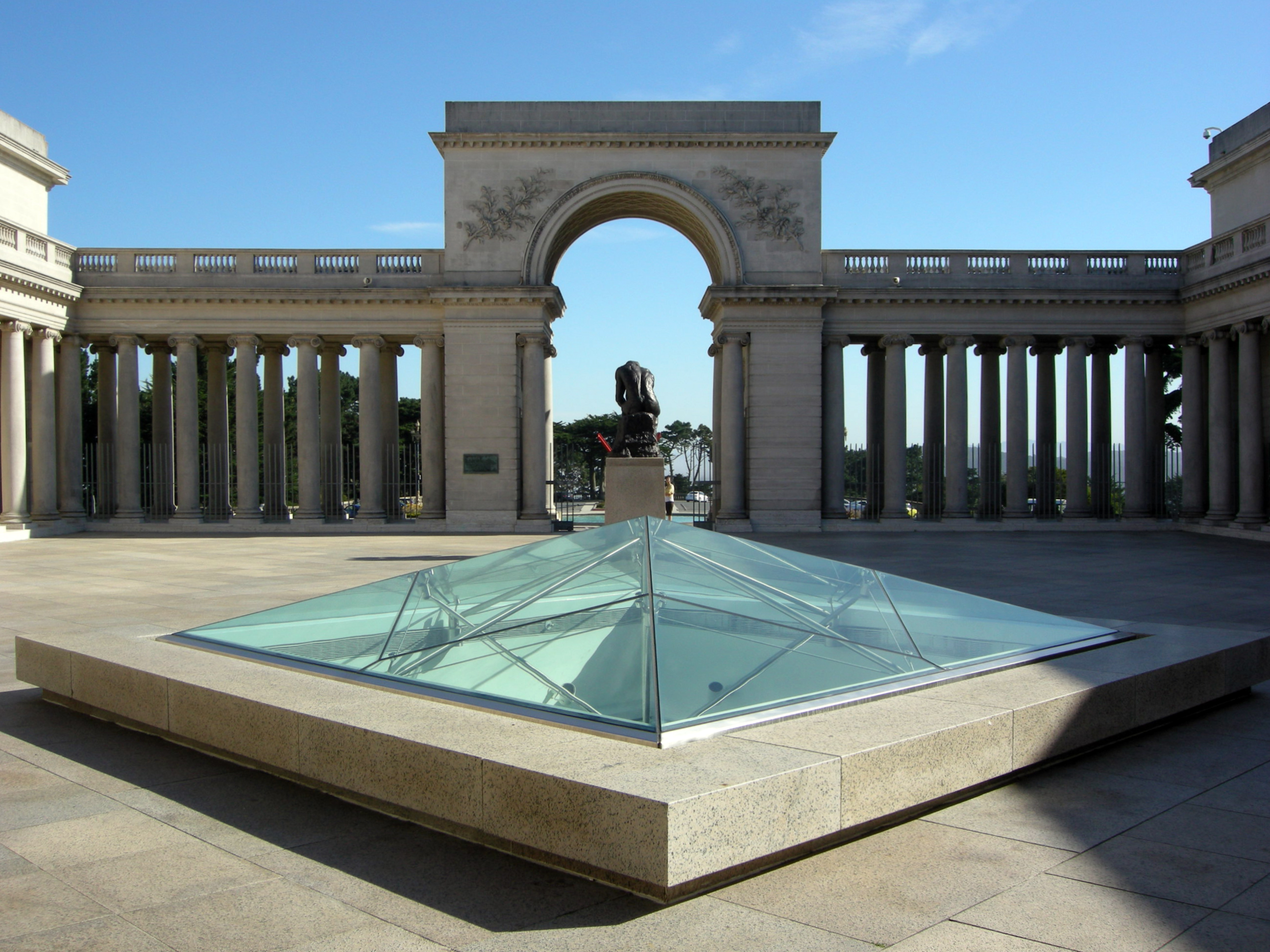
"The 1995 major renovation that included seismic strengthening, building systems upgrades, restoration of historic architectural features." "the pyramid skylight visible in the Legion courtyard. The glass pyramid sits atop the Rosekrans Court and special exhibition galleries located below."

In 2026, Cavagnero published his first monograph, Mark Cavagnero Architect. The publication surveys fifteen of his firm's projects, ranging from cultural and civic buildings to recreational and educational facilities.

== Notable Projects ==
- California Palace of the Legion of Honor Museum, San Francisco, California, 1995
- San Francisco Civic Center Courthouse, San Francisco, California, 1998
- Rafael Film Center, San Rafael, California, 1999
- Community School of Music and Arts at Finn Center, Mountain View, California, 2004
- Sava Pool, San Francisco, California, 2008
- ODC Theater Center, San Francisco, California, 2010
- Mammoth Lakes Courthouse, Mammoth Lakes, California, 2011
- SFJAZZ Center, San Francisco, California, 2013
- San Francisco Public Safety Campus, San Francisco, California, 2015
- Diane B. Wilsey Center for Opera, San Francisco, California, 2016
- Saint Mary's College High School Student Chapel, Albany California, 2018
- Moscone Center Expansion, San Francisco, California, 2019
- Salesforce Tower Ohana Floor, San Francisco, California, 2019
- San Francisco State University George and Judy Marcus Hall for the Creative Arts, San Francisco, California, 2021
- University of California, San Francisco, Joan and Sanford I. Weill Neuro Sciences Building, San Francisco, California, 2021
- Oakland Museum of California, Oakland, California, 2021
- San Francisco Conservatory of Music, Ute and William K. Bowes, Jr. Center for Performing Arts, San Francisco, California, 2021
- The Hamlin School, San Francisco, California, 2022
- Salesforce Dublin Historic Building and Hospitality Floors, Dublin, Ireland, 2023
- Salesforce Chicago Hospitality Floors, Chicago, Illinois, 2023
- Congregation Emanu-El, San Francisco, California, 2025

== Awards ==
Mark Cavagnero's work have garnered more than "100 design awards from regional, national and international organizations", including the 2015 Maybeck Award, the 2010 Distinguished Practice Award and the 2012 American Institute of Architects, Firm Award.
