= Mark Cavagnero Associates =

San Francisco-based architecture firm

Mark Cavagnero Associates (Cavagnero) is a San Francisco, California-based architecture firm founded by American architect Mark Cavagnero.

The firm was founded in 1988 as Barnes and Cavagnero with John Barnes (son of Edward Larrabee Barnes), and in 1993 became Mark Cavagnero Associates. The firm's portfolio encompasses cultural, commercial, education, and civic projects. Cavagnero provides a full range of architectural design services, from programming, master planning, site planning, and conceptual design, through construction documents and administration.

In 2026, the firm published its first monograph, Mark Cavagnero Architect. The publication surveys fifteen of the firm's projects, ranging from cultural and civic buildings to recreational and educational facilities.

== Notable Projects ==
- California Palace of the Legion of Honor Museum, San Francisco, California, 1995
- San Francisco Civic Center Courthouse, San Francisco, California, 1998
- Rafael Film Center, San Rafael, California, 1999
- Community School of Music and Arts at Finn Center, Mountain View, California, 2004
- Sava Pool, San Francisco, California, 2008
- ODC Theater Center, San Francisco, California, 2010
- Mammoth Lakes Courthouse, Mammoth Lakes, California, 2011
- San Francisco Public Safety Campus, San Francisco, California, 2015
- SFJAZZ Center, San Francisco, California, 2013
- Diane B. Wilsey Center for Opera, San Francisco, California, 2016
- Saint Mary's College High School Student Chapel, Albany, California, 2018
- Moscone Center Expansion, San Francisco, California, 2019
- Salesforce Tower Ohana Floor, San Francisco, California, 2019
- San Francisco State University George and Judy Marcus Hall for the Creative Arts, San Francisco, California, 2021
- University of California, San Francisco, Joan and Sanford I. Weill Neurosciences Building, San Francisco, California, 2021
- Oakland Museum of California, Oakland, California, 2021
- San Francisco Conservatory of Music, Ute and William K. Bowes, Jr. Center for Performing Arts, San Francisco, California, 2021
- The Hamlin School, San Francisco, California, 2022
- Arc Institute, Palo Alto, California, 2023
- Salesforce Dublin Historic Building and Hospitality Floors, Dublin, Ireland, 2023
- Salesforce Chicago Hospitality Floors, Chicago, Illinois, 2023
- Congregation Emanu-El, San Francisco, California, 2025

== Awards and Recognition ==
The firm was recognized by AIA California with the Distinguished Practice Award in 2010 and the Firm of the Year Award in 2012. In 2015, Mark Cavagnero received the Maybeck Award, the highest honor given to an individual architect by AIA California. The firm’s transformation of the Oakland Museum of California was presented as part of “PORCH: An Architecture of Generosity,” the 2025 U.S. Pavilion at the 19th International Architecture Biennale in Venice.

== List of Project Awards ==
- Chicago Athenaeum Museum International Architecture Award, Oakland Museum of California, 2011
- Chicago Athenaeum Museum International Architecture Award, Community Foundation Santa Cruz County, 2011
- AIA San Francisco Excellence in Architecture Honor Award, SFJAZZ Center, 2013
- United States Institute for Theatre Technology Merit Award, SF JAZZ Center, 2014
- AIA San Francisco Honor Award, Palega Recreation Center, 2015
- AIA San Francisco Excellence in Architecture Honor Award, College of Marin Academic Center, 2016
- AIA San Francisco Excellence in Architecture Citation Award, San Francisco Public Safety Campus, 2016
- Chicago Athenaeum Museum International Architecture Award, College of Marin Academic Center, 2017
- Chicago Athenaeum Museum International Architecture Award, San Francisco Public Safety Campus, 2017
- Faith & Form/Interfaith Design, Saint Mary's College High School Student Chapel, 2018
- AIA San Francisco Architecture Citation Award, San Francisco State University George and Judy Marcus Hall for the Liberal and Creative Arts, 2021
- AIA San Francisco Architecture Merit Award + Public Design Commendation, Oakland Museum of California, 2021
- Chicago Athenaeum International Architecture Award, SF Conservatory of Music, Ute and William K. Bowes, Jr. Center for Performing Arts, 2022
- Chicago Athenaeum International Architecture Award, SF State University, George and Judy Marcus Hall for the Creative Arts, 2022
- Chicago Athenaeum American Architecture Award, UCSF, Joan and Sanford I. Weill Neurosciences Building, 2023
- Chicago Athenaeum American Architecture Award 2023, The Hamlin School, 2023
- AIA California Design Merit Award, SF Conservatory of Music, Ute and William K. Bowes, Jr. Center for Performing Arts, 2024
- International Design Awards, SILVER in Commercial Interior Design – Creative Space Design, Salesforce Tokyo Ohana Floor, 2024
- International Design Awards, SILVER in Commercial Architecture – Culture & Education, West Valley College Visual Arts Building, 2024
- Architizer A+Awards Popular Choice Winner, Commercial Interiors (<25,000SF), Salesforce Tokyo Hospitality Floors, 2025
- AIA California Citation Award, Institutional/Education, SF State University, George and Judy Marcus Hall for the Creative Arts, 2025
- AIA San Francisco Architecture Citation Award, UCSF Joan and Sanford I. Weill Neurosciences Building, 2025
- Chicago Athenaeum American Architecture Award, Arc Institute, 2025
- Chicago Athenaeum 2026 Green Good Design Award, Congregation Emanu-El, 2026
- Chicago Athenaeum 2026 Green Good Design Award, Hawkins Treasure Island, 2026
- AIA California Design Merit Award, Congregation Emanu-El, 2026
- AIA Healthcare Design Award, UCSF Joan and Sanford I. Weill Neurosciences Building, 2026
