= Catherine Wagner =

Catherine Wagner may refer to:

- Catherine Wagner (poet)
- Catherine Wagner (artist)
