= Jan Shrem =

American book distributor and publisher (1930–2024)

- Born: Jan Isaac Shrem; 1930; Colombia
- Died: September 2024 (aged 94)
- Education: University of Utah; UCLA; University of Bordeaux
- Occupation: Book distributor, Book publisher. Winery owner, Art collector, Philanthropist
- Spouse: Mitsuko Shrem (m. 1960; died 2010) Maria Manetti Shrem (m. 2012)
- Children: 2

Jan Isaac Shrem (1930 – September 2024) was an American book distributor and publisher, winery owner, art collector and philanthropist.

== Early life and education ==
Shrem's given name is pronounced "Yawn". Born in Colombia to Jewish-Lebanese parents, Shrem spent his childhood in Jerusalem, then the administrative capital of Mandatory Palestine, and his early adolescence in Colombia. As the Second World War was ending, his parents sent him at the age of 16 to the United States, where he lived in New York with an aunt. He attended the University of Utah and UCLA, where he studied architecture, but left for Japan without completing a degree. While in college, he sold encyclopedias.

== Book distribution and publishing business in Japan ==
A romance with a Japanese woman led Shrem to visit Japan, where he stayed for 13 years. He began by selling English-language books door to door, and went on to establish a book distribution company handling English-language encyclopedias, engineering books and art books; the company also published Japanese translations. He married Mitsuko while living in Japan. By the time he sold the business, it had 50 offices and 2,000 salespeople.

== Business ventures in Europe ==
After selling his Japanese company, Shrem lived with his family in Italy and France, where he continued with publishing and book distribution ventures. There, he began collecting art and learning about wine. He studied enology at the University of Bordeaux.

== Clos Pegase Winery ==
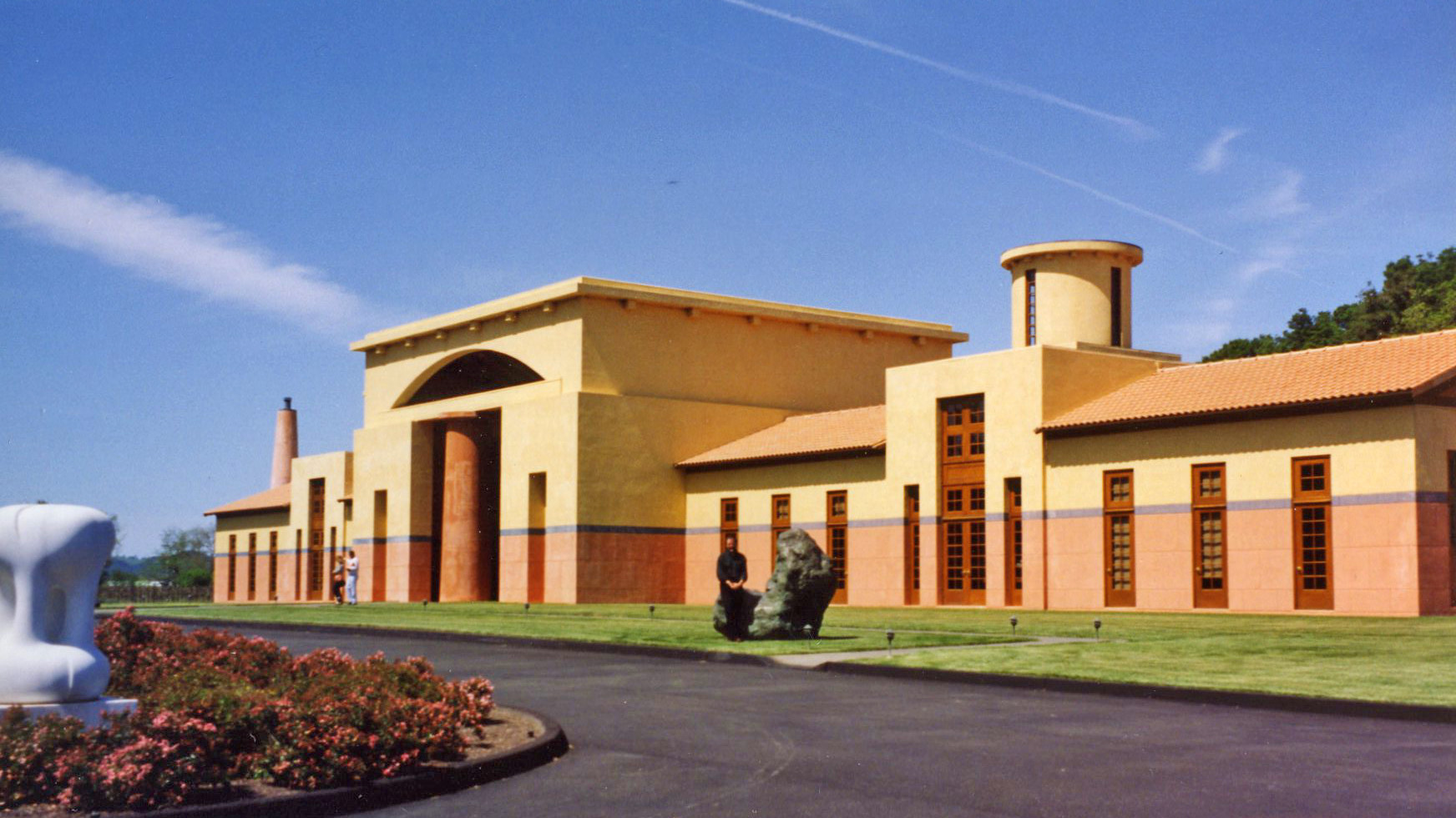
Clos Pegase Winery

After retiring from the publishing business, Shrem relocated to the Napa Valley, where he and his wife purchased 50 acres in Calistoga and established Clos Pegase Winery in 1983. The winery took its name and label image from Odilon Redon's Pégase, a work in Shrem's art collection.

In cooperation with the San Francisco Museum of Modern Art, he conducted an architectural design competition for a winery building. Out of 96 entries, the winner was Michael Graves, who would design the postmodern Clos Pegase Winery building, which opened in 1987. André Tchelistcheff made the winery's first wines, from the 1985 vintage.

In 1988, in the Washington Post, James Conaway said that "Clos Pegase is our first monument to wine as art."

In 2007, it was described by architecture critic Susan Dinkelspiel Cerny as "an interpretation of Classicism in ochre and burnt sienna, with a spare desert feeling."

The estate eventually covered 450 acres and included an underground theater and concert hall, with some 350 works from Shrem's art collection displayed in rotation.

Shrem was well known for delivering a humorous lecture on the 4000-year history of wine as seen through art. He called his presentation "Bacchus the Rascal: A Bacchanalian History of Wine Seen Through 4000 Years of Art".

Shrem sold Clos Pegase to Leslie Rudd's Vintage Wine Estates in 2013, when he was 83; by then the winery produced 25,000 cases annually from 215 acres of vineyards.

In July 2024, Vintage Wine Estates filed for Chapter 11 bankruptcy protection, with plans to sell all of its assets, including Clos Pegase. The winery was subsequently acquired by Jay Adair.

=== Art collection ===
In May 2023, 17 works from the collection Shrem had formed with Maria Manetti Shrem were offered at Sotheby's in New York under the title "The Art of Giving", with proceeds directed to charitable causes in the arts, music, education and medical research. The sale was led by Pablo Picasso's Femme nue couchée jouant avec un chat (1964), which realised $21.2 million with fees; 15 works sold from the collection brought a total of $26.6 million.

== Personal life ==
Shrem met Mitsuko Shrem in 1960; they married and had two sons, Marc and David. They were married until her death from pancreatic cancer in 2010.

In 2012, Shrem married Maria Manetti Shrem.

A resident of San Francisco, Shrem died in September 2024 at the age of 94 following a long illness. His death was not announced publicly until late October, and neither the exact date nor the cause was disclosed.

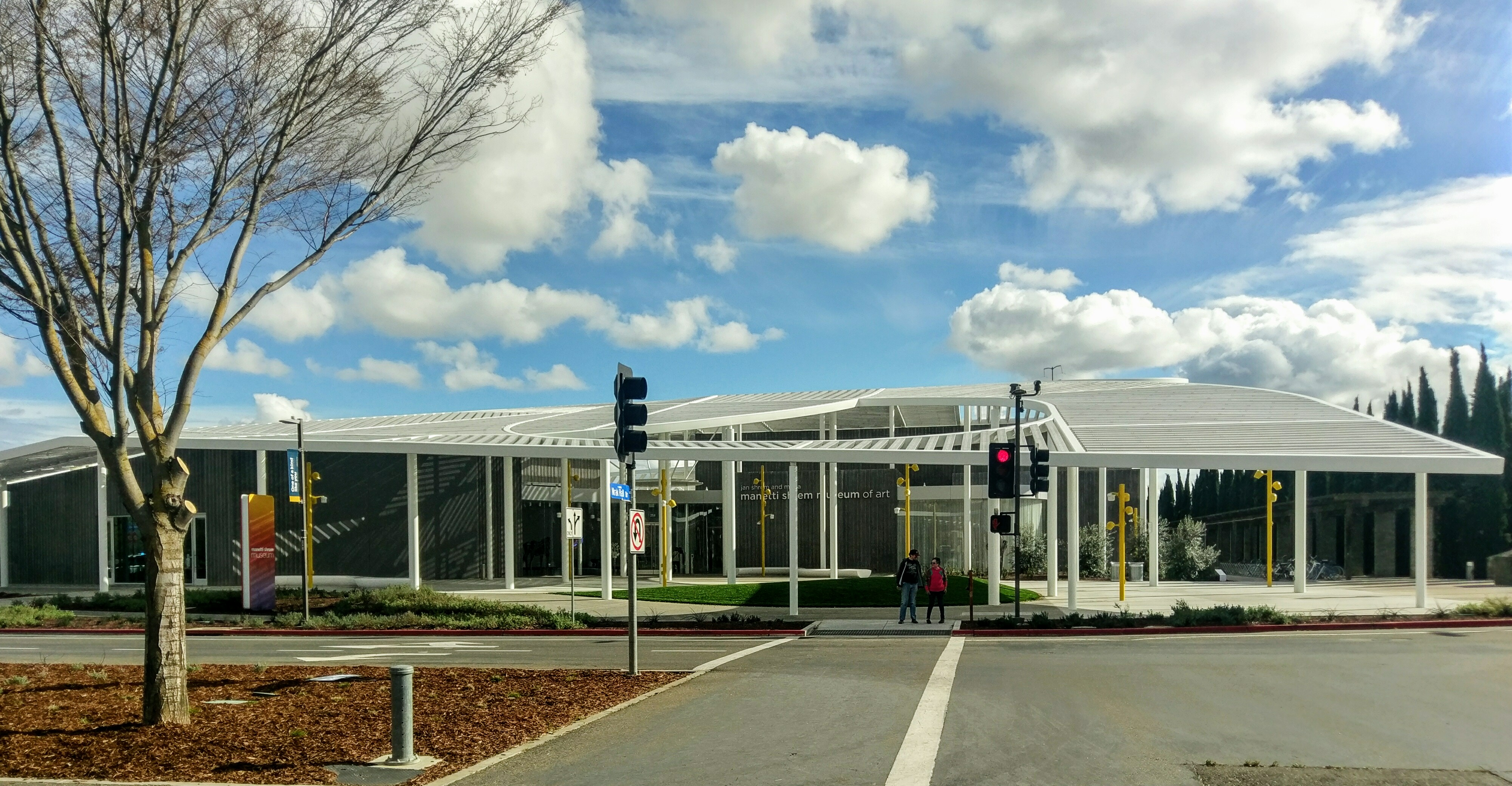
Manetti Shrem Museum of Art

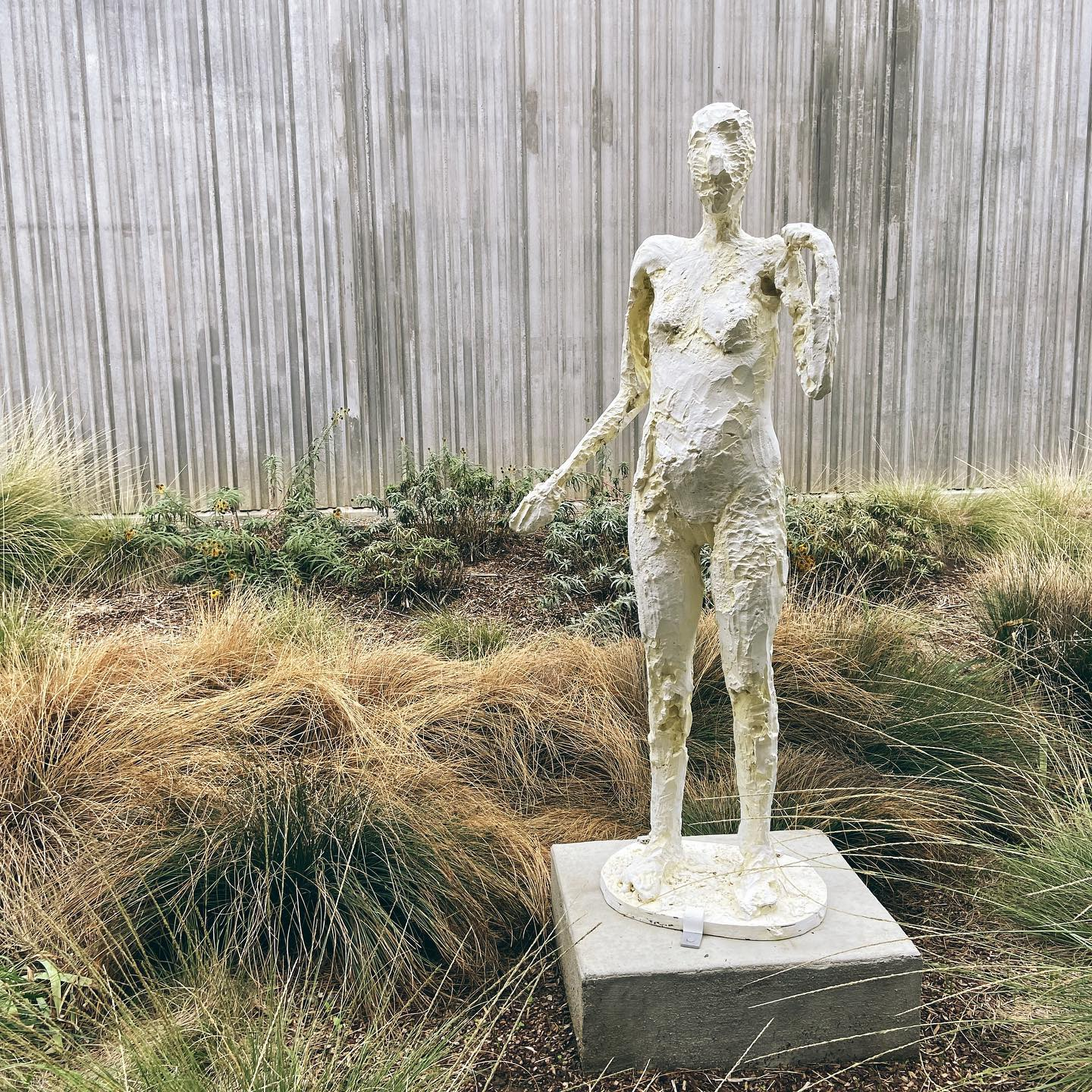
Jan Shrem and Maria Manetti Shrem Museum of Art at UC Davis

== Philanthropy ==
In recent years, the Shrems have donated $10 million to the University of California, Davis to help build the Manetti Shrem Museum of Art, $3 million to the San Francisco Opera and $1.5 million to KQED in San Francisco. The gift to KQED was the largest individual gift that public radio and TV station had ever received. In 2019, the Shrems donated $18 million to the University of California, San Francisco to build the Jan Shrem and Maria Manetti Shrem Neurology Clinic, a unique clinic specializing in difficult-to-diagnose neurology cases, located within the Weill Institute for Neurosciences.
