= CSMA =

CSMA may refer to:

== Organizations ==
- Cathedral of Saint Mary of the Assumption (San Francisco, California), principal Catholic church in the San Francisco Archdiocese, US
- Civil Service Motoring Association, a private motoring organisation in the UK
- Coastal Sound Music Academy, a choral organization in Coquitlam, British Columbia, Canada
- Community School of Music and Arts at Finn Center, an art and music school in Mountain View, California, US
- Congregation of Saint Michael the Archangel, a Catholic religious institute based in Poland

== Other uses ==
- Carrier-sense multiple access, a MAC networking protocol
