= Jing Liu (architect) =

American architect

Jing Liu (born 1980) is an architect, educator and co-founder of the award-winning design firm Solid Objectives - Idenburg Liu (SO-IL) in New York City.

== Biography ==
Jing Liu was born in Nanjing, China. Liu moved a lot during her teenage years, and received her education in China, Japan, the United Kingdom and the United States. From 1999-2004, Liu studied Architecture at Tulane University School of Architecture in New Orleans, and moved to New York in 2004.

In 2008 Liu founded SO – IL with Dutch architect Florian Idenburg. In 2010, the firm won the MoMA PS1 Young Architects Program with Pole Dance a highly experimental and interactive structure installation. They went on to design the award-winning Kukje Gallery in Seoul. The design of Kukje Gallery marks an important moment in the architecture today in which "one finds a multidimensional architecture in step with the ambiguous spatiality of the digital era," wrote the British architectural critic Sam Jacob in Domus. In 2012 and 2013, SO – IL was commissioned to design the inaugural presence for the Frieze Art Fair in New York City. Working with a prefabricated rental tent structure forced them to be inventive with a limited vocabulary. Pie-shaped tent section wedges bend the otherwise straight tent into a meandering, supple, shape. The winding form animates it on the unusual waterfront site, as well as establishing the temporary structure as an icon along the water. In Spring 2013, SO – IL won a competition to design the new Jan Shrem and Maria Manetti Shrem Museum of Art at the University of California, Davis.

Liu has been a faculty member at Columbia University’s GSAPP since 2009, and has taught at Syracuse University, School of Architecture, and at Parsons The New School for Design.

In 2015, Liu and Florian Idenburg curated Landscapes of the Hyperreal: Ábalos&Herreros selected by SO – IL at the Canadian Centre for Architecture.

== Recognition ==
Liu was finalist for the Moira Gemmill Prize for Emerging Architecture in 2017 and in 2018, Liu was awarded the Vilcek Prizes for Creative Promise in architecture.
