= Maria Manetti Shrem =

Italian-American philanthropist, arts patron, and businesswoman

- Born: Florence, Italy
- Occupation: Philanthropist
- Spouse: Jan Shrem (married 2012)
- Website: https://manettishrem.com/

Maria Manetti Shrem is an Italian-American philanthropist, arts patron, and businesswoman. Born in Florence, Italy she is known for her philanthropic work in arts, education, music, and health.

== Early life and career ==
Born in Florence, Italy, Manetti Shrem moved to San Francisco in 1972. She became instrumental in the internationalization of luxury fashion brands such as Gucci, Fendi, and Mark Cross under her company Manetti Farrow.

In the 1980s, she established Villa Mille Rose in Napa Valley, an estate where she has hosted numerous celebrities and politicians, including Luciano Pavarotti, Sophia Loren, Nancy Pelosi, Kamala Harris, Gavin Newsom, and Andrea Bocelli.

In 2012, she married businessman Jan Shrem in a courthouse ceremony.

Manetti Shrem divides her time between San Francisco and Florence. Shrem is a buddhist.

== Philanthropy ==
In 2011, Manetti Shrem and her husband Jan Shrem donated $10 million to establish the Jan Shrem and Maria Manetti Shrem Museum of Art at the University of California, Davis, which opened on November 13, 2016. The museum's collection includes works by major artists such as Wayne Thiebaud, William T. Wiley, Robert Arneson, Roy De Forest, Ruth Horsting, Manuel Neri, and Roland Petersen.

The museum dedicates 30% of its space for educational projects, providing a dedicated area for workshops in the tradition of the Florentine Renaissance "Bottega dell'Arte." The architectural design by New York-based architect Florian Idenburg (SO-IL) was listed in ARTnews as "One of The World's 25 Best Museum Buildings of the Past 100 Years."

In May 2024, Manetti Shrem pledged more than $20 million to UC Davis to fund arts programs, the largest gift to the arts in UC Davis history. This brings her total giving to UC Davis to over $43 million.

In January 2022, June 22 was proclaimed "Manetti Shrem Day" by then Mayor of San Francisco, London Breed.
