= Florian Idenburg =

Dutch architect (b.1975)

- Born: 1975 (age 50–51); Haarlem, Netherlands
- Education: TU Delft Faculty of Architecture
- Occupation: Architect
- Practice: SO – IL

Florian Idenburg (born 1975, Haarlem) is a Dutch architect and co-founder of the award-winning architectural design firm SO – IL in New York City.

== Education and early career ==
Idenburg studied architecture at the Delft University of Technology in the Netherlands, receiving a MSc. in Architectural Engineering in 1999. From 2000 to 2007, Idenburg served as Associate at SANAA, where he was in charge of the design and realization of two internationally acclaimed museums (the Glass Pavilion at the Toledo Museum of Art and the New Museum of Contemporary Art in New York).

== Professional life ==
After the successful completion of the New Museum with SANAA in 2008, he established SO – IL with Jing Liu in New York. In 2010, the firm won the MoMA PS1 Young Architects Program with Pole Dance a highly experimental and interactive structure installation. They went on to design a residence for designer Ivan Chermayeff in upstate New York, a wedding chapel in Nanjing, China, the Flockr outdoor exhibition space in Beijing, and the AIA New York award-winning Kukje Gallery in Seoul. In 2012 and 2013, SO – IL was commissioned to design the inaugural presence for the Frieze fair in New York City. Working with a prefabricated rental tent structure forced them to be inventive with a limited vocabulary. Pie-shaped tent section wedges bend the otherwise straight tent into a meandering, supple shape. The winding form animates it on the unusual waterfront site, and it establishes the temporary structure as an icon along the water. In Spring 2013, SO – IL won a competition to design the new Jan Shrem and Maria Manetti Shrem Museum of Art at the University of California at Davis.

In 2015, Idenburg and Jing Liu curated Landscapes of the Hyperreal: Ábalos&Herreros selected by SO – IL at the Canadian Centre for Architecture.

== Academic life ==
Idenburg is a Professor of the Practice at Cornell University, and has been Associate Professor of Practice at the Graduate School of Design at Harvard and has taught studios at Columbia as well. He has held the Brown-Forman Chair in Urban Design at the University of Kentucky (2010), and has been a visiting lecturer at Princeton University (2007). In 2010, Idenburg won the Dutch Charlotte Köhler Award.

Florian Idenburg lives in Brooklyn, New York, with his wife, Jing Liu and two daughters.

== Notable projects ==
- Amant Foundation Art Gallery, Brooklyn, NY (Ongoing)
- Site Verrier, Meisenthal, France (Ongoing)
- Las Americas Social Housing, Leon, Mexico (2021)
- Breathe – MINI Living, Milan, Italy (2017)
- Jan Shrem and Maria Manetti Shrem Museum of Art, Davis, CA, USA (2016)
- Kukje Gallery—K3, Seoul, South Korea (2012)
- Frieze Art Fair, NY, New York, USA (2012)
- Pole Dance, NY, New York, USA (2010)

== Awards ==
- MoMA PS1 Young Architects Program (2009)
