= SO-IL =

Architectural firm

SO – IL

Practice information
- Founders: Florian Idenburg; Jing Liu
- Founded: 2008
- Location: Brooklyn, New York City, U.S.

Significant works and honors
- Buildings: Jan Shrem and Maria Manetti Shrem Museum of Art; Kukje Gallery; Amant Art Campus

Website
- so-il.org

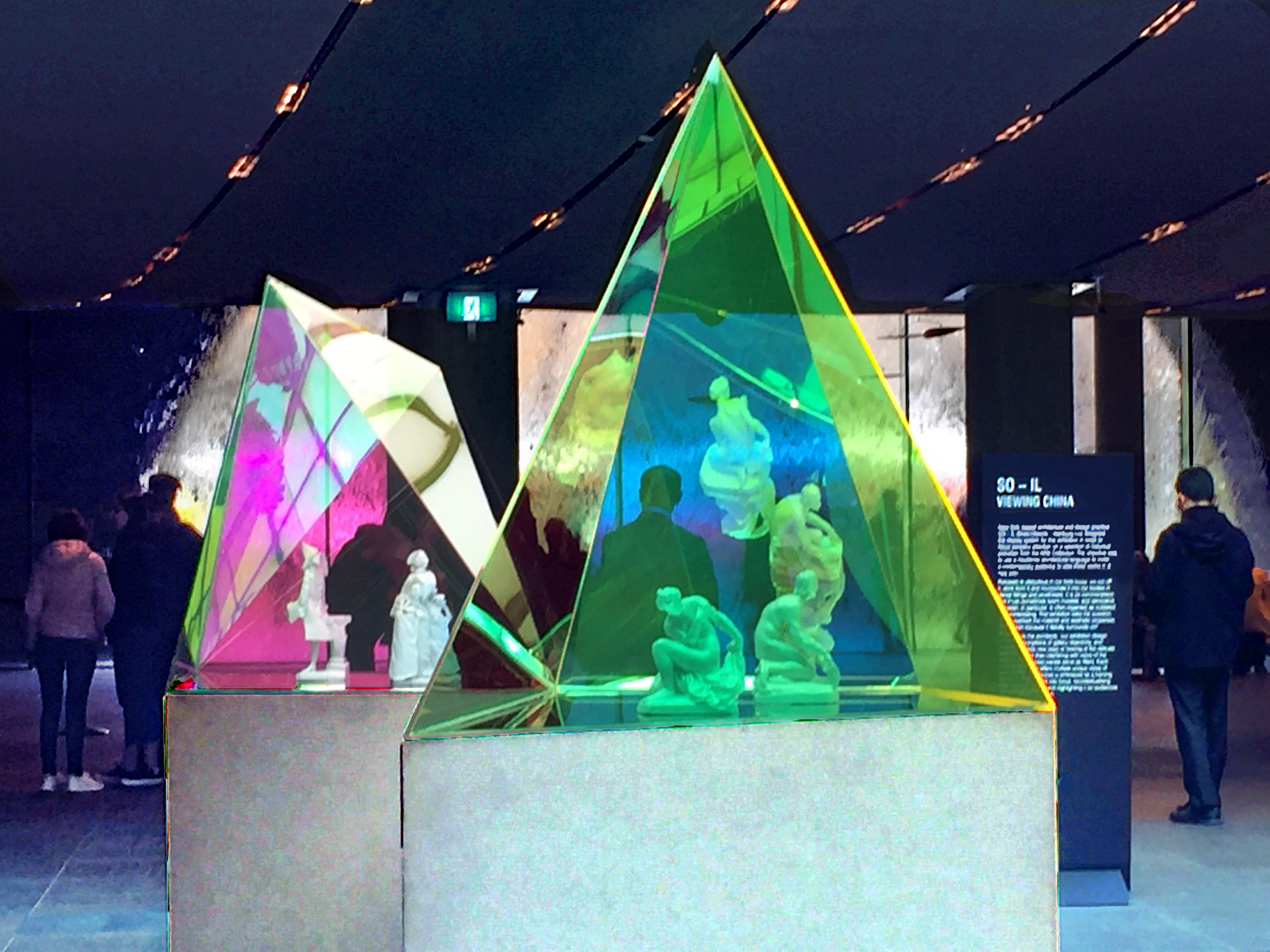
SO-IL Viewing China Exhibition 2019, National Gallery of Victoria, Melbourne, Australia

SO – IL or Solid Objectives – Idenburg Liu is an architecture firm in Brooklyn, New York City, which was founded in 2008 by Florian Idenburg (born 1975, Netherlands) and Jing Liu (born 1980, China).

Liu and Idenburg first met in 2000 at SANAA in Japan while she was an intern and he was an associate working with Pritzker prize-winners Kazuyo Sejima and Ryue Nishizawa. In 2002, they met again in New York when Idenburg was working on the New Museum project in Lower Manhattan and Liu was working for Thomas Leeser. They founded SO-IL in 2008.

In 2010, the firm won the MoMA PS1 Young Architects Program with its playful, interactive installation Pole Dance. They went on to design a residence for designer Ivan Chermayeff in upstate New York, the inaugural presence for the Frieze fair in New York City, and the award-winning Kukje Gallery in Seoul. They are well known for their innovative use of materials, exemplified in the stainless steel chainmail mesh facade developed and fabricated for Kukje Gallery and 10-meter tall monolithic glass tubes for the CTF Museum in Hong Kong. For the inaugural Frieze tent, working with a prefabricated rental tent structure forced them to be inventive with a limited vocabulary. Pie-shaped tent section wedges bend the otherwise straight tent into a meandering, supple shape. The winding form animates it on the unusual waterfront site and establishes the temporary structure as an icon along the water.

In Spring 2013, SO – IL won a competition to design the new Jan Shrem and Maria Manetti Shrem Museum of Art at the University of California, Davis. The museum includes a 50,000-square-foot permeable roof or "Grand Canopy" that blurs building edges and creates a sensory landscape of various activities and scales. The building was completed in 2016 and achieved LEED Platinum.

== Gallery ==
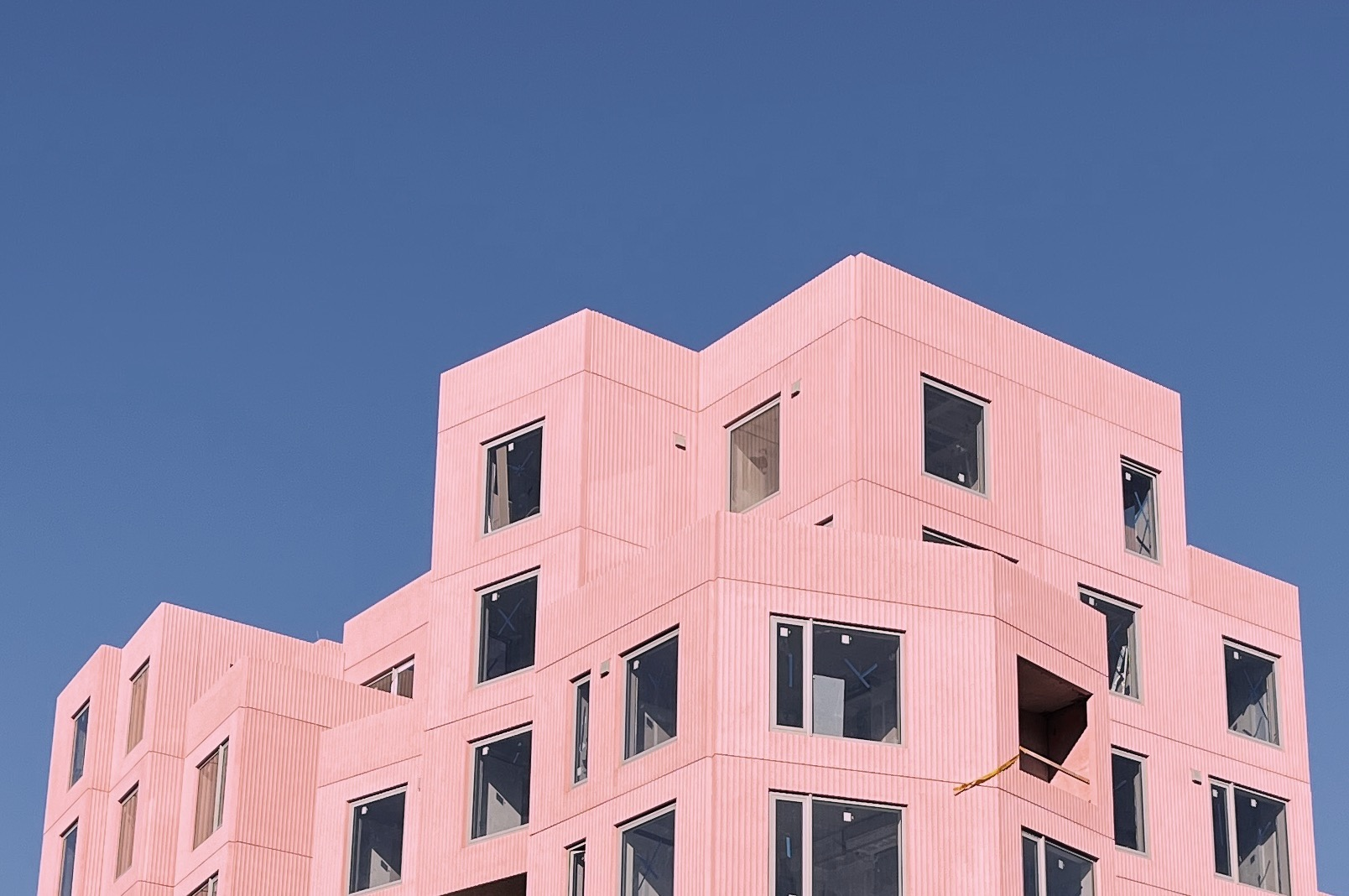
144 Vanderbilt, Brooklyn, USA

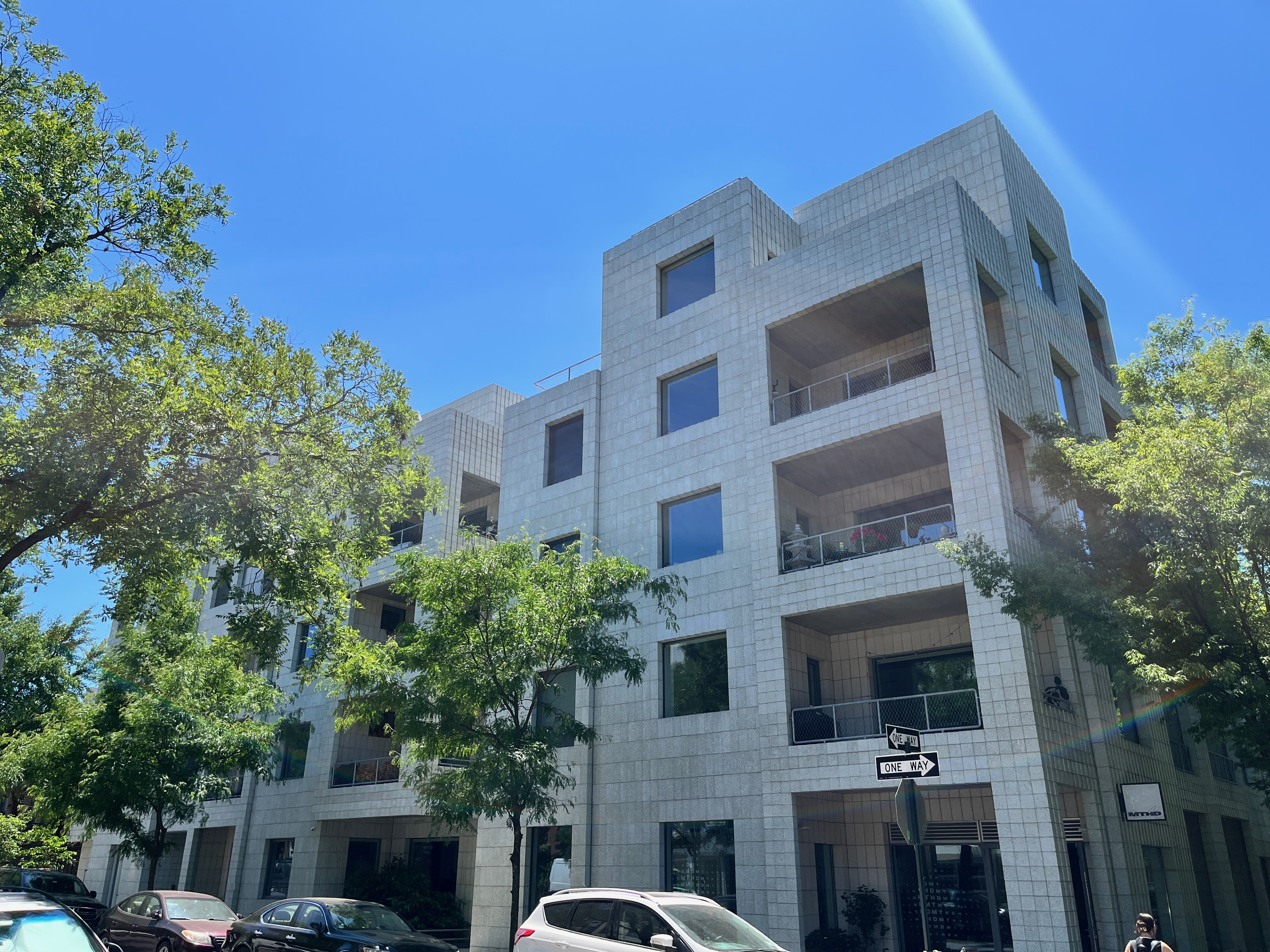
450 Warren, Brooklyn, USA

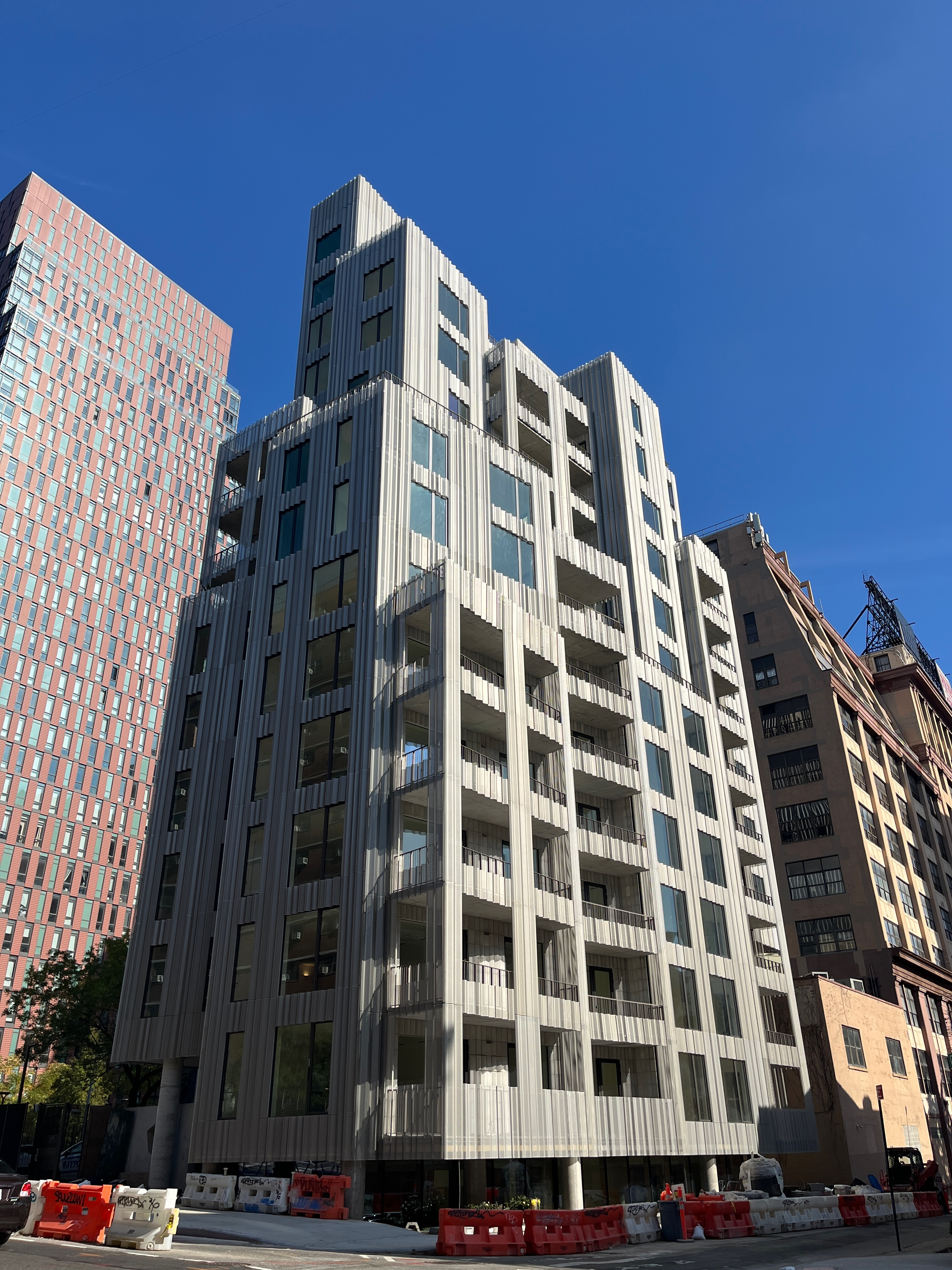
9 Chapel, Brooklyn, USA
