= Larsen Park =

Park in San Francisco, California, United States

Carl Larsen Park
- Location within San Francisco
- Type: Municipal (San Francisco)
- Coordinates: 37.7392978°N 122.4759660°W
- Area: 6.58 acres (2.66 ha)
- Created: 1927
- Open: daily, 5am – midnight
- Public transit: ; Line 28
- Website: sfrecpark.org/destination/carl-larsen-park/

Carl Larsen Park is a 6.6-acre (2.7 ha) neighborhood park located in the Parkside District on the West Side of San Francisco. It lies west of 19th Avenue, at the intersection with Vicente, and just north of Stern Grove. The park is named for Carl Larsen, a chicken rancher, who donated the land for the park to the City in 1926. Larsen Park features a baseball diamond, pickleball courts, basketball court, playground and indoor pool; the pool, formerly named Larsen Pool, is now named for local swimming instructor Charlie Sava.

Larsen Park earned the nickname Jet Plane Park by featuring three retired Navy jets from 1959 to 1993, used as play structures by local children, making the park a local landmark clearly visible from busy 19th Avenue. A jet-inspired sculpture, made of concrete, and a climbing structure were added to the playground in November 2015 after petitions and fundraising efforts by local residents, who gave it the nickname (The) Airplane Park.

== History ==
Carl Larsen was a carpenter, restaurant owner, chicken rancher and landowner in the Sunset District; he donated the land that would become Larsen Park to the City in 1926. The park was built under the supervision of John McLaren and opened in 1927. Larsen's gift to the City is memorialized with a plaque attached to a rock at the corner of 19th and Ulloa, in the northeastern corner of the park; the plaque was sculpted by prominent sculptor M. Earl Cummings.

Larsen was born in Odense, Denmark in 1844 and emigrated to the United States in his twenties. He moved to San Francisco in 1869 and was credited as one of the builders who worked on the since-demolished North Hall at UC-Berkeley. Larsen started the Tivoli Cafe at 18 Eddy Street in 1879; although it was subsequently destroyed in the earthquake and fire of 1906, Larsen rebuilt it along with the Hotel Larsen. During the donation ceremony, Larsen said, "It has been the fondest hope of my life to see a beautiful park on those rocks and hills."

Larsen Park opened with outdoor card rooms, one each for men and women; a baseball diamond; tennis courts; and a soccer field. The card rooms and soccer field are now gone.

Work on the playground renovation began in July 2014.

On 18 December 2023, the park's tennis courts were replaced with pickleball courts, to accommodate the increasing popularity of pickleball.

Starting on 10 August 2026, the large cypress tree in the center of the park's northern grass field is being removed, because of a significant structural split which was found on the tree, which may have posed a safety risk to those around the tree. In order to bring more greenery back to Larsen Park in the absence of the cypress tree, SF Parks & Recreation is planning to plant up to 10 new trees in the fall of 2026.

=== Jets at Larsen Park ===
In 1959, the first retired Navy jet was installed, a Grumman F-9 Cougar which was transported by road from Moffett Field with the help of the California Highway Patrol. The tail number was 127490, within the block assigned to the F9F-6P reconnaissance variant with a camera in lieu of a nose gun; the F-9 also bore markings assigning it to Composite Squadron 61 (VC-61) with "PP" prominently displayed on the tail, which confirms it was a former reconnaissance plane. The F-9 was replaced by a North American FJ-2/-3 Fury in 1967, which was in turn replaced by a Vought F-8 Crusader in 1975. The Crusader was delivered by helicopter from Alameda Naval Air Station; it took a roundabout over-water course under both the Bay Bridge and the Golden Gate Bridge before setting the plane down at the San Francisco Zoo for safety reasons. At the playground the Crusader was set almost flush with the ground, the cockpit was filled with concrete, the engine was replaced with a corrugated-metal crawl space, and a slide was attached to the side of the plane.

The Crusader was removed in 1993 after city park officials were unwilling to pay US$40,000 (equivalent to $91,800 in 2025) for lead paint abatement; it was subsequently restored and is on display (but no climbing is allowed) at the Pacific Coast Air Museum (PCAM) in Santa Rosa. The Navy asked PCAM to take the plane several times before the museum consented and removed the airplane in 1993 with a crane and two flatbed trucks. It was assumed the landing gear had been removed when the Crusader was set flush to the ground, but when it was removed, the gear were found extended and resting in pits, and the tires still held air after reinflation. In gratitude for rescuing the Crusader, the National Naval Aviation Museum loaned several more planes to PCAM, including an A-6E Intruder, a F-14A Tomcat, and a F-16N Viper.

Meanwhile, the playground continued to deteriorate and more equipment was removed over the years; in 2013, Supervisor Carmen Chu noted the only reason the playground had not been given a failing grade by the San Francisco Parks Alliance was because the remaining equipment did not meet the definition of a playground. A US$1,000,000 (equivalent to $1,380,000 in 2025) fundraising effort, including US$150,000 (equivalent to $207,000 in 2025) for a jet-inspired playground sculpture, culminated in a re-dedicated playground which opened on November 21, 2015. A retired plane was deemed too expensive and would create too many liability concerns, which is why the jet-inspired sculpture was chosen instead. Scott Peterson, who had designed the wave structure at the Koret Children's Quarter in Golden Gate Park, was selected as the designer for the jet sculpture. However, Peterson was removed from the project in June 2015 after the management team concluded he could not meet the contract specifications, and the jet sculpture was redesigned and built by GameTime instead.

== Sava Pool ==
Besides the signature playground jet sculpture, baseball diamond and tennis courts, there is an indoor pool, the Charlie Sava Pool. The pool was once named the Larsen Pool, but was renamed in honor of Charlie Sava, a local swimming instructor who coached Olympic swimmer Ann Curtis.

The old pool was razed in 2007, and a new Charlie Sava pool opened in December 2008 on the same site at a cost of US$17,000,000 (equivalent to $25,420,000 in 2025). The pool has eight lanes 25 yards (23 m) long. The new pool building was designed by architects Mark Cavagnero and Paulett Taggart, and features "Swimmer's Waves," an installation comprising a set of porcelain enamel-on-steel photographic prints from Catherine Wagner. The new building was honored with a 2009 American Architecture Award from the Chicago Athenaeum Museum of Architecture and Design. The water level is set flush with the floor, and together with the floor-to-ceiling windows and general southern slope of the site, Wawona Street to the south of the building seems to disappear from the swimmers' perspective in the pool, leaving a grand view of Stern Grove.
