= Mill Valley Film Festival =

Annual film festival held in Mill Valley, United States

Coordinates: 37°58.3903′N 122°31.7152′W

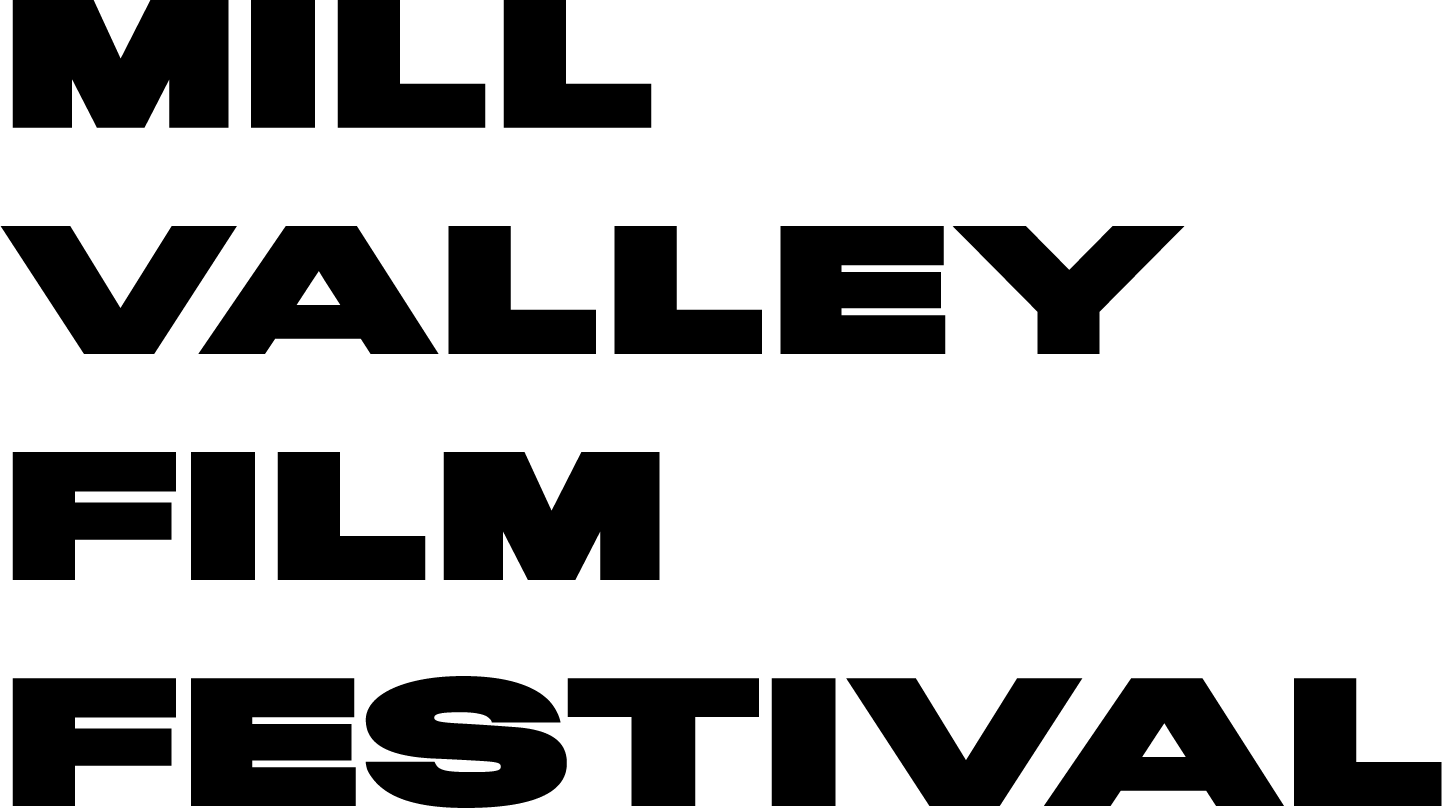
- Location: Mill Valley, California, United States
- Founded: October 1977; 48 years ago
- Founded by: Mark Fishkin
- Hosted by: California Film Institute
- Website: mvff.com

The Mill Valley Film Festival (MVFF) is an annual film festival organized by the California Film Institute. It takes place each October in Mill Valley, California, and welcomes more than 200 filmmakers, representing more than 50 countries, each year.

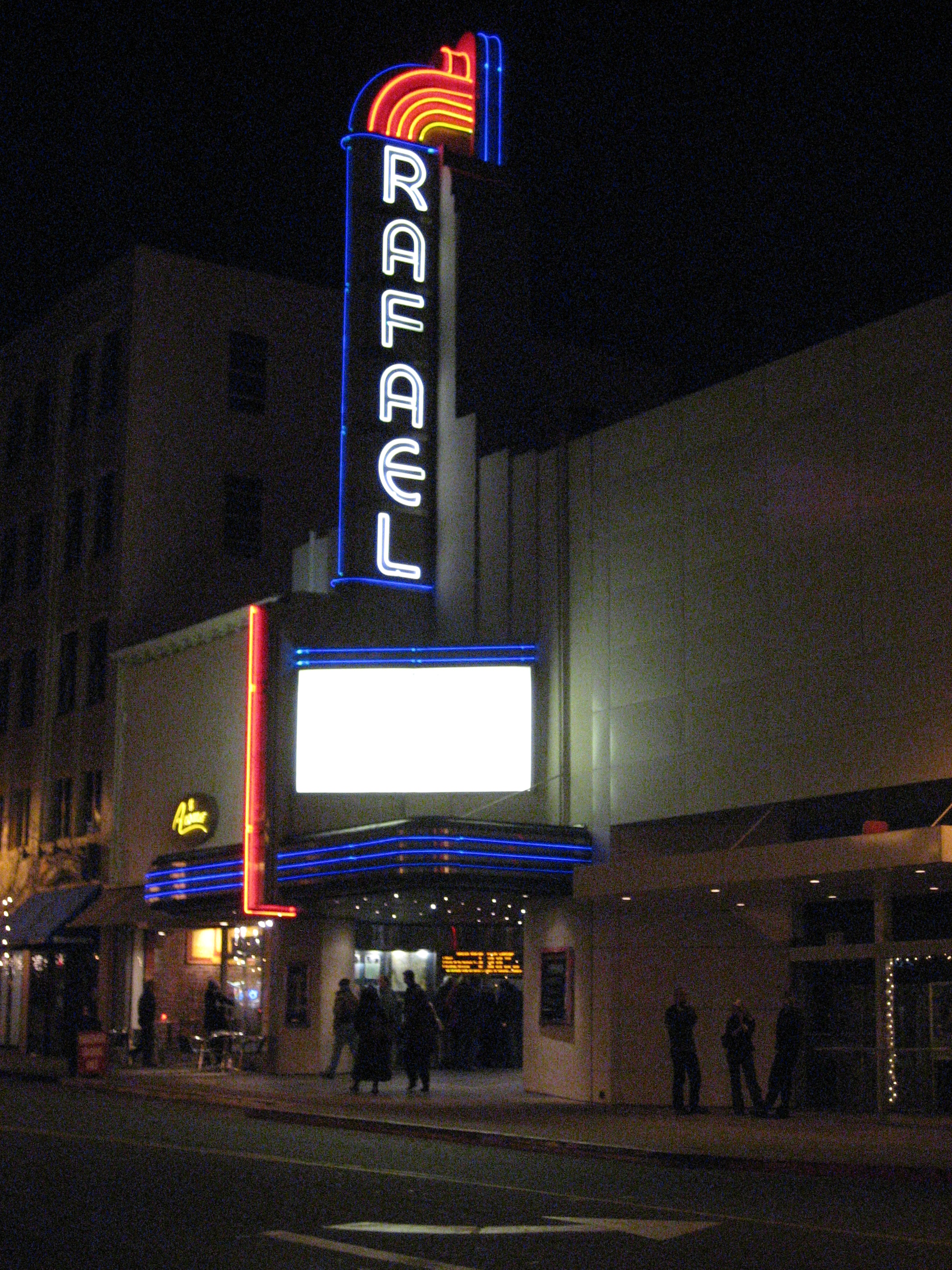
The Rafael Film Center is one location of the Mill Valley Film Festival.

== History ==
In October 1977, Mark Fishkin, Rita Cahill, and Lois Cole organized a three-day film festival. It featured film tributes for Francis Ford Coppola's The Rain People and George Lucas' Filmmaker. The first official festival took place in August 1978.

== About the Festival ==
The San Francisco Bay Area continues to be a significant market for independent and international films, and MVFF provides a forum for introducing new films to West Coast audiences.

Presented by the California Film Institute, the Mill Valley Film Festival takes place in early October. With a reputation for launching new films and creating awards-season buzz, MVFF has earned a reputation as a "filmmakers' festival" by celebrating the best in American independent and world cinema alongside high-profile and prestigious award contenders.

Notable attendees have included actors Gena Rowlands, Forest Whitaker, Alfre Woodard, and Robin Williams, and directors Sean Baker, Jane Campion, Greta Gerwig, and Denis Villeneuve.

Festival sections include the World Cinema, US Cinema, Valley of the Docs, filmHOOD, 5@5 (shorts programs), and MVFF Music.

Festival initiatives include Mind the Gap: Women | Film | Tech, Viva El Cine! and Active Cinema.

The festival also features tributes and spotlights to acclaimed filmmakers, screenwriters, and actors. Screenings are usually held at the Christopher B Smith Rafael Film Center in San Rafael, the Sequoia Theatre in Mill Valley, the Cinema in Corte Madera, and the Lark Theatre in Larkspur.

Screen International has named Mill Valley Film Festival a top-10 US film festival.
