= Manetti Shrem Museum of Art =

Fine arts museum in Davis, California, U.S.

Coordinates: 38.5335°N 121.7478°W

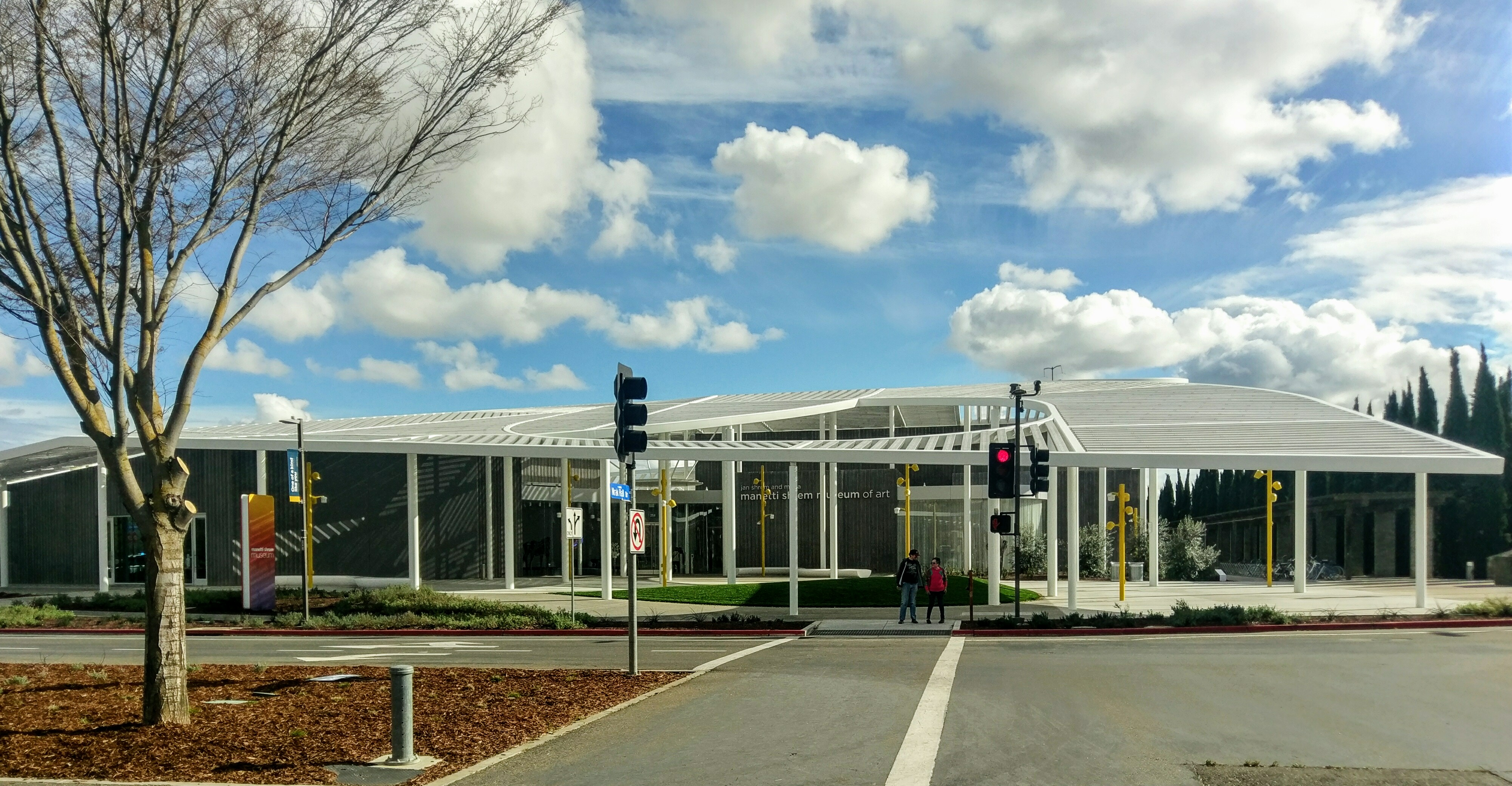
Manetti Shrem Museum of Art

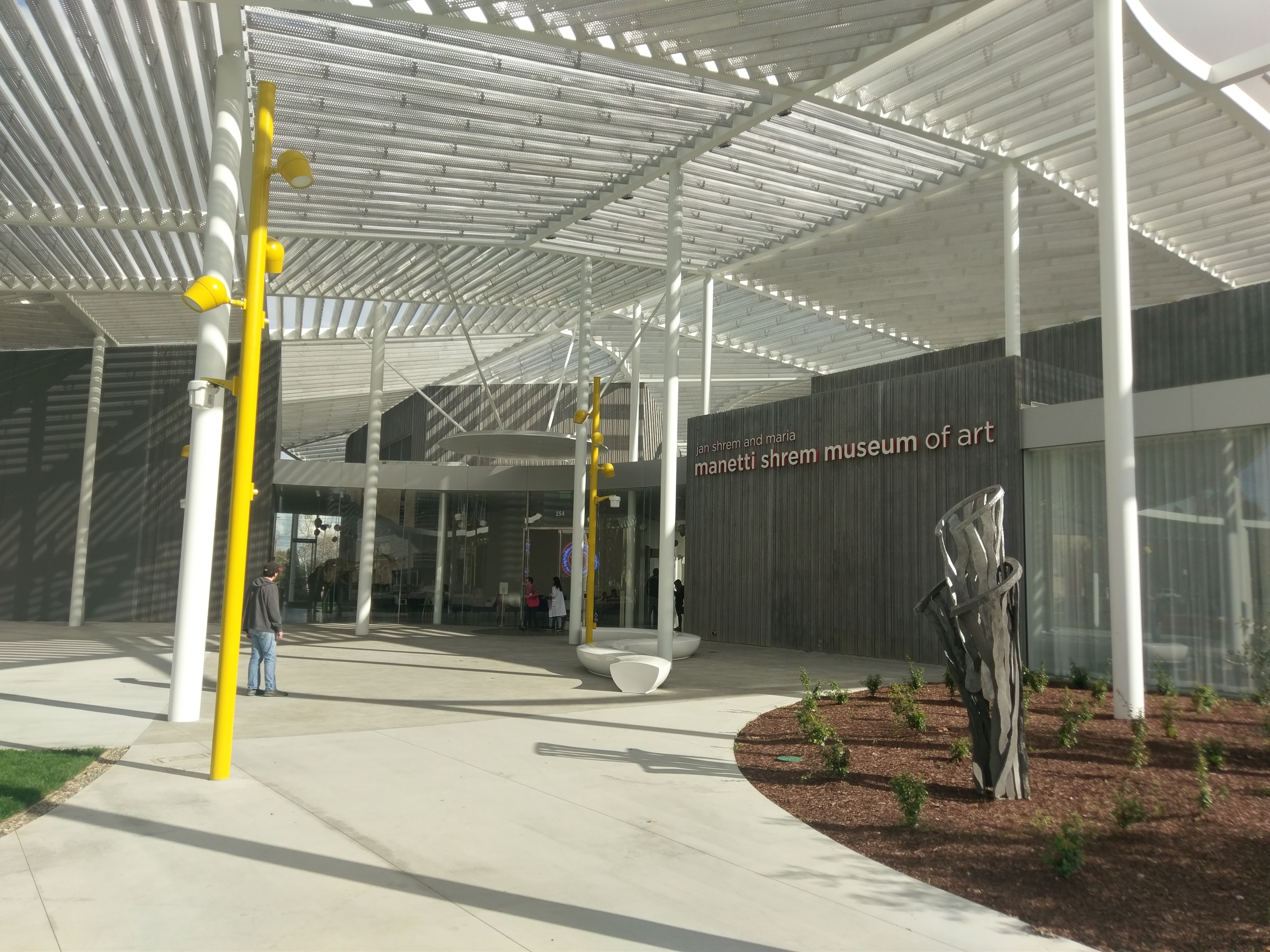
Entrance to the Manetti Shrem Museum of Art

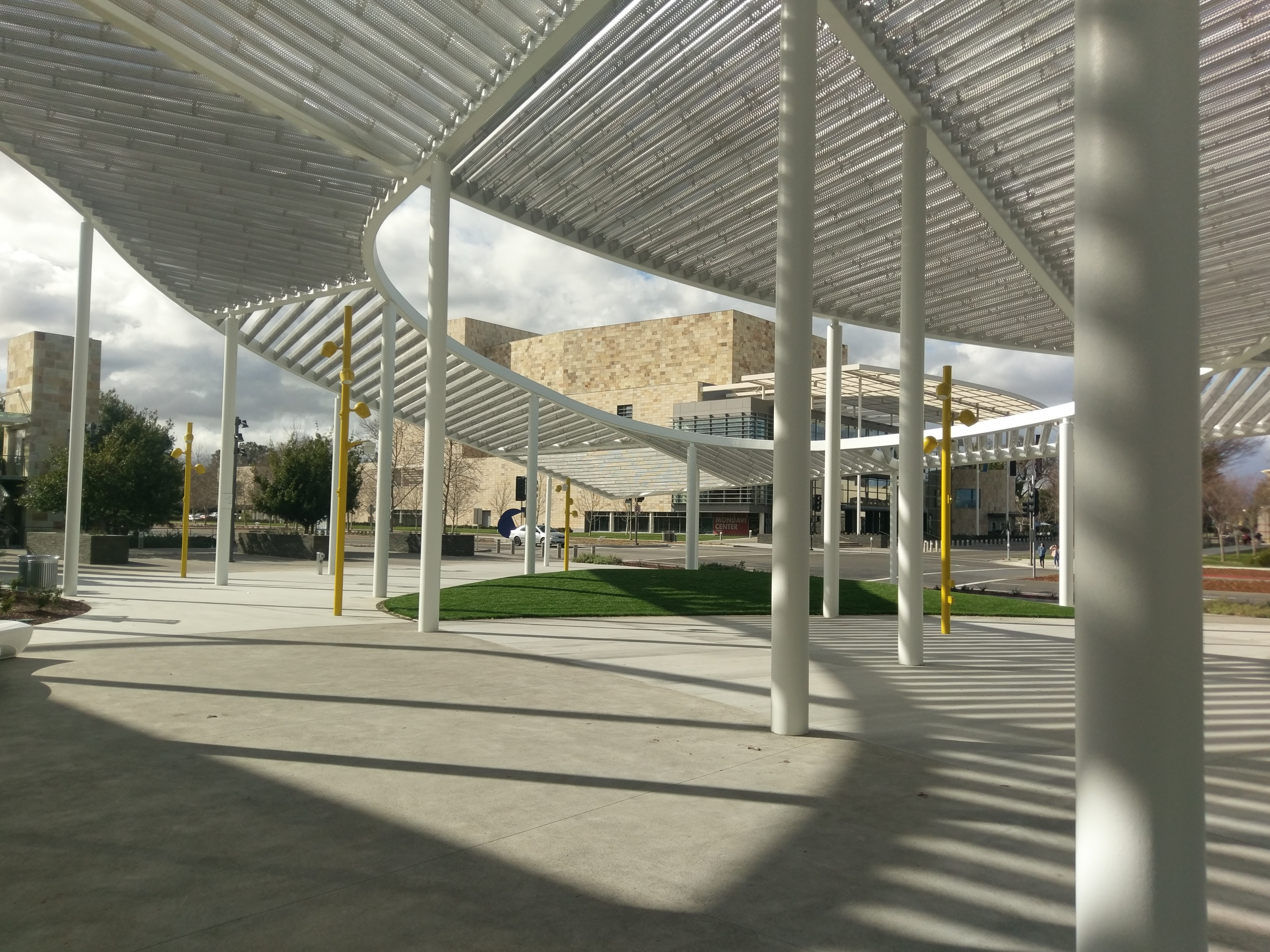
Swirling "Grand Canopy" around the Manetti Shrem Museum of Art

The Manetti Shrem Museum of Art is a fine arts museum located at the University of California, Davis in Davis, California. Its full name is the Jan Shrem and Maria Manetti Shrem Museum of Art.

The museum opened on November 13, 2016. According to The New York Times, the museum includes "trailblazing contributions by the school’s renowned art faculty, which contributed to innovations in conceptual, performance and video art in the 1960s and 70s".

== Background ==
Richard L. Nelson was the founder of the art department at UC Davis, and he recruited a faculty in the early 1960s that included highly successful artists such as Wayne Thiebaud, Robert Arneson, Roy De Forest, Manuel Neri, Roland Petersen and William T. Wiley. Several were associated with the Funk art genre.

In a negative 1981 review in The New York Times, conservative art critic Hilton Kramer referred to Arneson as the leader of "a spirit best defined as defiant provincialism" at UC Davis. That phrase has since been embraced as a defining description by artists associated with UC Davis.

For nearly 60 years, the art faculty hoped for and discussed the possibility of building a dedicated art museum, according to museum director Rachel Teagle.

== Financing ==
Margrit Mondavi, widow of Napa Valley winemaker Robert Mondavi, made an initial $2 million donation to begin the project. Napa Valley winemaker Jan Shrem, founder of Clos Pegase winery, and his wife Maria Manetti Shrem, donated $10 million of the $30 million budget for building the museum.

== Design ==
The architects were Florian Idenburg and Jing Liu of the firm SO-IL of Brooklyn, who partnered with local architect Bohlin Cywinski Jackson.

Writing in the Los Angeles Times, architecture critic Christopher Hawthorne described the building: "Inside, a lobby with lightly polished concrete floors is lined with a sweeping curve of floor-to-ceiling glass. As you enter, a multipurpose room that can be arranged as an auditorium is off to the left, with classrooms, studios and museum offices straight ahead. To the right are the galleries, which fill rooms of varying sizes and heights and are topped with a ceiling of aluminum mesh, through which mechanical equipment is left visible."

A "focal point" of the design is the Grand Canopy, a structure of swooping curves that surrounds the museum. Described as a "perforated aluminum and steel roof that creates textured light and shadows throughout the grounds", it was inspired by the geometry of the farm fields that surround Davis.

According to then-acting UCD Chancellor Ralph Hexter, "Students, faculty, staff and the public all will be able to enjoy our rich art legacy and history at UC Davis in a gorgeous and inviting building at the gateway to our campus. Our new museum stresses education first and foremost, with classrooms, a working studio for students and other resources near the entrance where all can see and enjoy for generations to come."

In 2022, the Manetti Shrem Museum was listed as #24 of ARTnews's "The 25 Best Museum Buildings of the Past 100 Years".

== Collection ==
The museum owns nearly 6,000 art objects, including many works by Bruce Nauman, a 1966 MFA graduate of the university. Wayne Thiebaud donated 72 of his own works and 300 works by other artists to the museum's permanent collection. In addition to his financial support, Jan Shrem has also donated works of art, including sculptures from his collection, to the museum's collection.

== See also ==
- C.N. Gorman Museum, UC Davis on-campus museum dedicated to Native American art
