= Mono County Superior Court =

California superior court with jurisdiction over Mono County

Superior Court of California, County of Mono
- 1880 Mono County Courthouse in Bridgeport (photographed in 2012 by Carol Highsmith)
- Interactive map of Superior Court of California, County of Mono
- 37.64592°N 118.96333°W
- Established: 1861
- Jurisdiction: Mono County, California
- Location: Bridgeport (county seat); Mammoth Lakes (main)
- Coordinates: 37.64592°N 118.96333°W
- Appeals to: California Court of Appeal for the Third District
- Website: mono.courts.ca.gov

Presiding Judge
- Currently: Hon. Mark G. Magit

Assistant Presiding Judge
- Currently: Hon. Gerald F. Mohun, Jr.

Court Executive Officer
- Currently: Lester Perpall

The Superior Court of California, County of Mono, Informally the Mono County Superior Court, is the California superior court with jurisdiction over Mono County.

== History ==
Mono County was partitioned from Calaveras, Fresno, and Mariposa counties in 1861. Aurora was named as the initial county seat.

In 1863, a detailed survey concluded that Aurora was in the Territory of Nevada instead and after it was named the seat of Esmeralda County, Nevada, the county seat was moved to Bridgeport by election in 1864. The county records were hauled from Aurora to Bridgeport and stored in Kingsley's Inn, which served as the first county courthouse. The 2-1/2 story Mono County Courthouse was completed in 1880, designed by J.R. Roberts and built by Charles Anton, Samuel Hopkins, and James Cain. The 1880 courthouse is still serving its original purpose as the north branch courthouse for the county, and is among the oldest operating courthouses in California. An annex was built in 1974.

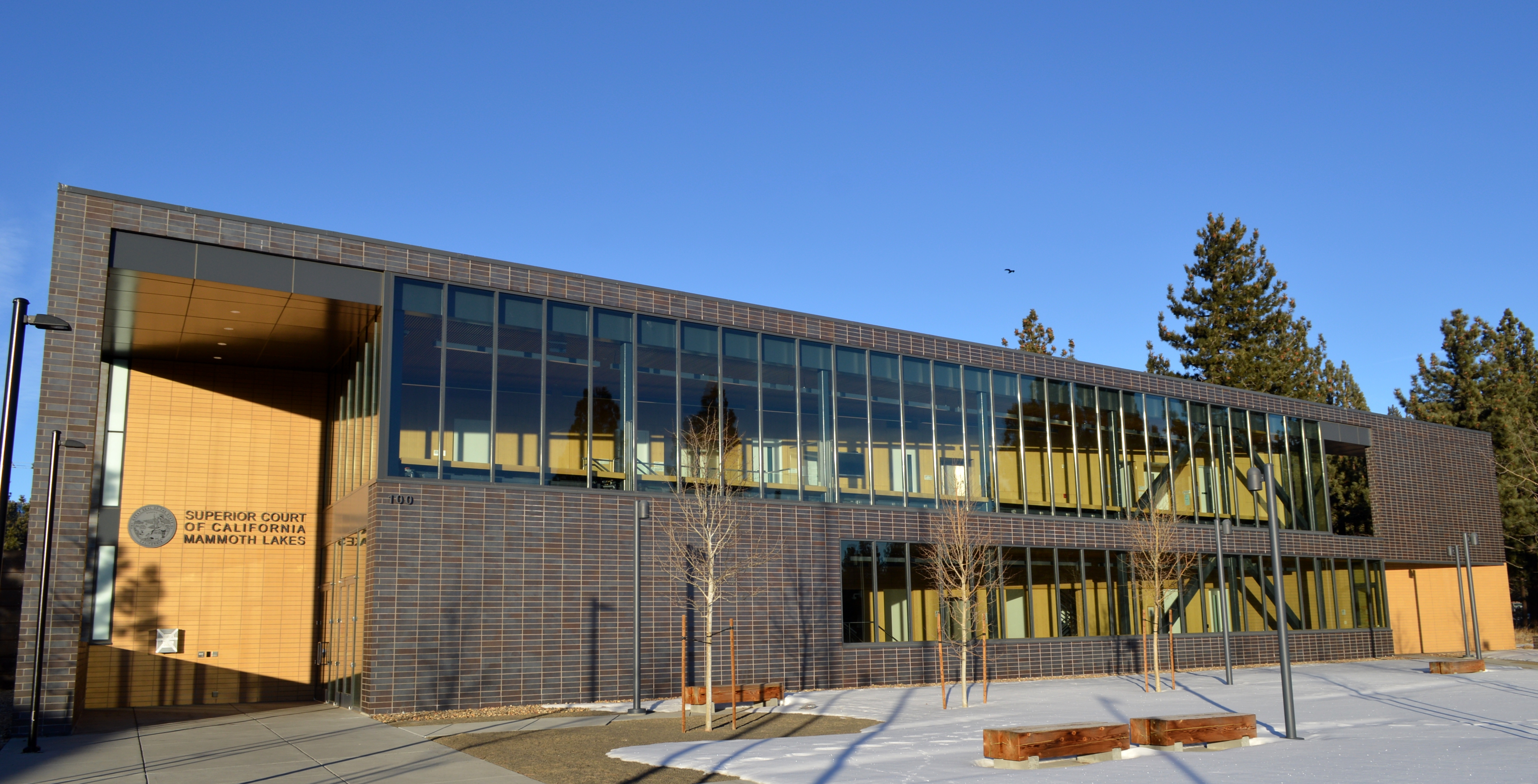
Mammoth Lakes courthouse (2013)

Court proceedings for the southern part of the county were held in a leased space in Mammoth Lakes, the county's only incorporated city. A study in 2003 showed that 90% of all court proceedings were held in Mammoth Lakes, prompting a 2006 Feasibility Report which concluded a new courthouse in that city was needed; because Bridgeport and Mammoth Lakes are approximately one hour's drive apart and there is no central population center in the county, both locations would need to be maintained. The new Mammoth Lakes Courthouse was completed in 2011 and occupied in September of that year.

== Venues ==
Mono County Superior Court locations:
1 278 Main St (Bridgeport)
2 100 Thompson Way (Mammoth Lakes)

Although the county seat and old courthouse is in Bridgeport, court administration and most proceedings are held in the two-courtroom building in Mammoth Lakes, completed in 2011.
