= Mono County Courthouse =

- U.S. National Register of Historic Places
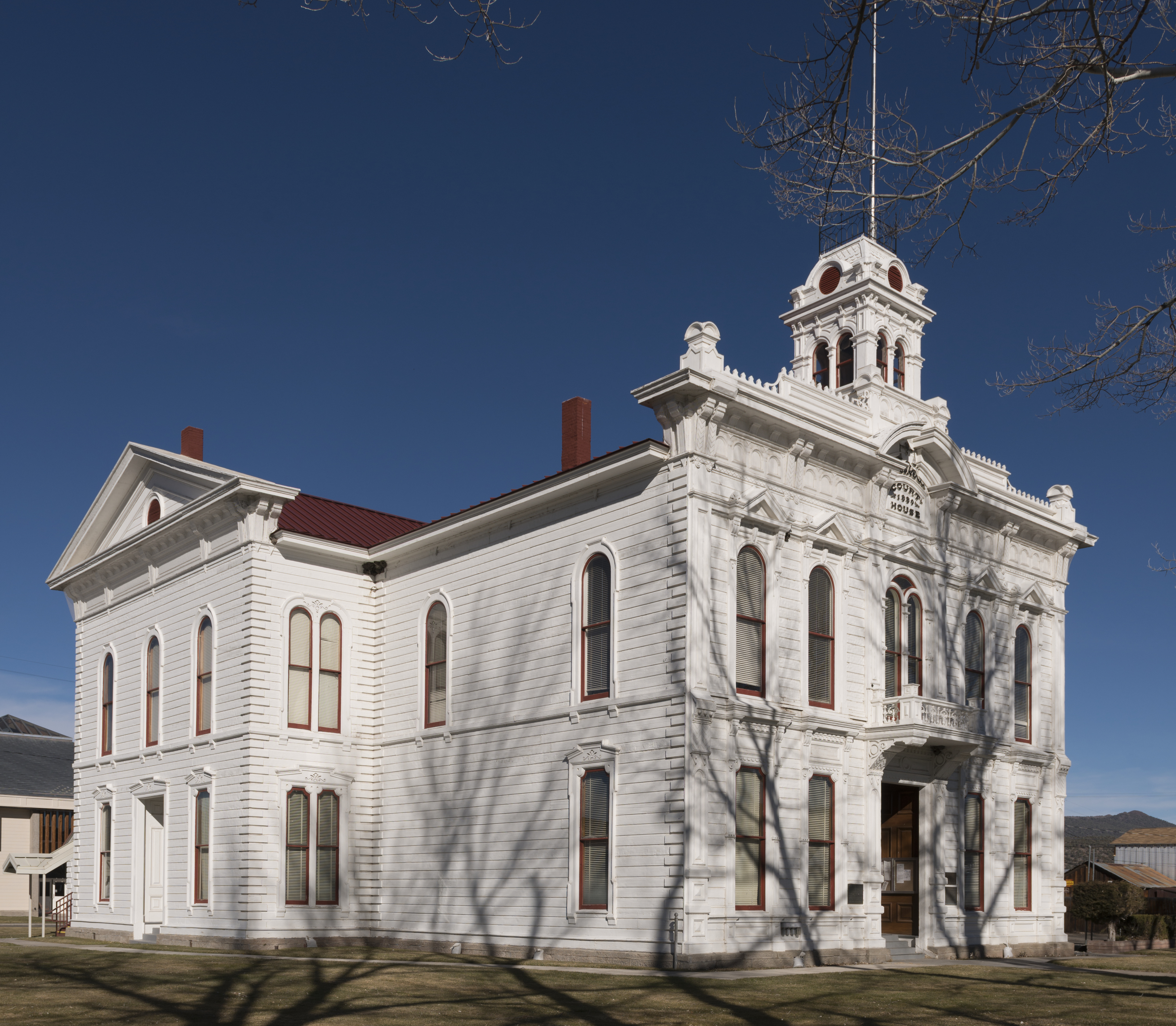

- Location within California Location within the United States
- Interactive map showing the location of Mono County Courthouse
- Location: Main St., Bridgeport, California
- Coordinates: 38°15′22″N 119°13′39″W
- Area: 1.5 acres (0.61 ha)
- Built: 1880
- Architect: Roberts, J.R.
- Architectural style: Italianate
- NRHP reference No.: 74000536
- Added to NRHP: March 1, 1974

The Mono County Courthouse, on Main St. in Bridgeport, California, is a historic Italianate-style building that was built in 1880.

It is a 2 1/2-story building with dimensions 74 by 80 feet (23 m × 24 m). It was designed by architect J. R. Roberts and was built for total cost of $31,000 (equivalent to $863,000 in 2024). It was listed on the National Register of Historic Places in 1974.
