= Moscone Center =

Convention center in San Francisco, California

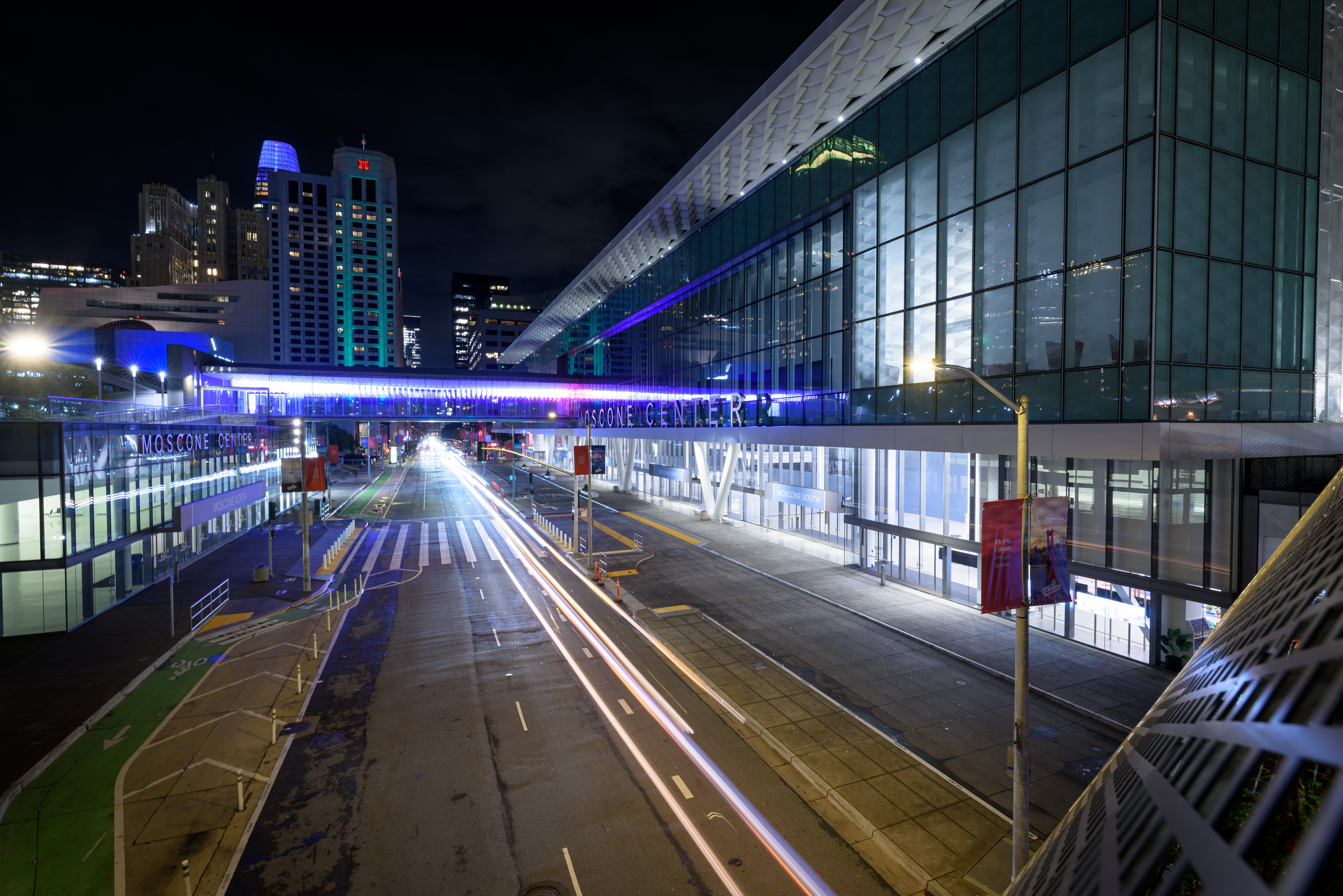
- The entrances to Moscone North (left) and Moscone South (right)
- Interactive map of Moscone Center
- Address: 747 Howard Street; San Francisco, California; 94103
- Coordinates: 37.7842°N 122.4016°W
- Owner: City and County of San Francisco
- Operator: ASM Global
- Public transit: Powell Street; Yerba Buena/Moscone

Construction
- Built: 1981 (Moscone South)
- Opened: 1981
- Expanded: 1991 (Moscone North); 2003 (Moscone West); 2018 (Moscone North & South)
- Cost: $157 million (Moscone North); $158 million (Moscone West)
- Architects: HOK (Moscone South); Gensler/DMJM (Moscone North & Esplanade); Gensler (Moscone West); SOM/Cavagnero (2018 expansion)

Website
- www.moscone.com

The George R. Moscone Convention Center (/mɒsˈkoʊni/), popularly known as the Moscone Center, is the largest convention and exhibition complex in San Francisco, California, United States. The complex consists of three main halls spread out across three blocks and 87 acres (35 ha) in the South of Market neighborhood. The convention center originally opened in 1981. It is named after former San Francisco mayor George Moscone, who was assassinated in November 1978.

== History ==
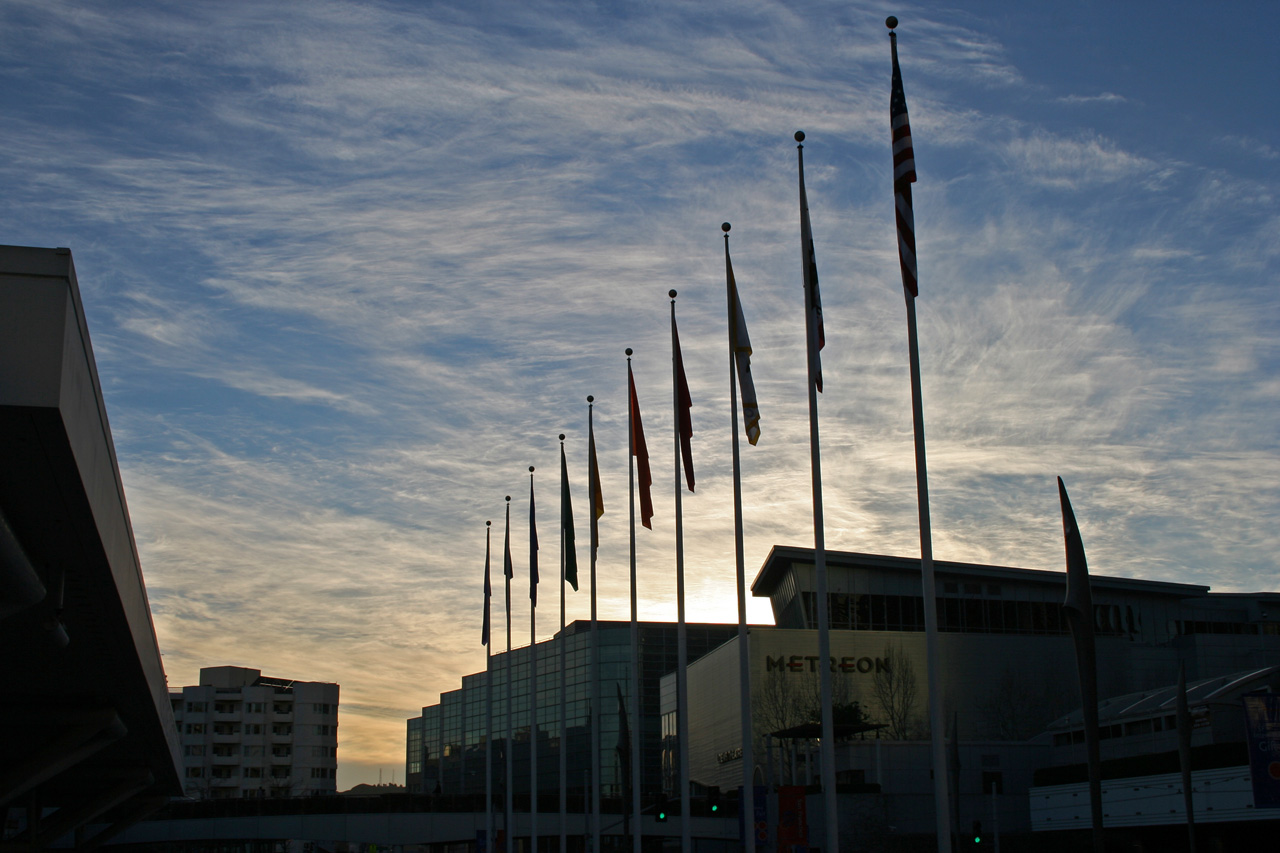
Moscone Center at sunset

The South of Market Area where Moscone Center was built was claimed by the San Francisco Redevelopment Agency, and a protracted battle was fought by the displaced low-income residents during the 1960s and 1970s.

Although the center is named after the murdered mayor, Moscone initially opposed the development of the area when he served on the SF Board of Supervisors in the 1960s because he felt it would displace elderly and poor residents of the area. As mayor, Moscone convened a special committee of proponents and opponents of a convention center. Hearings were held throughout SF seeking citizen input. A compromise was reached which was supported by Moscone. He put the matter on the ballot in November 1976 and it passed overwhelmingly.

The original Moscone Convention Center hall opened in 1981 on the site of what is now known as Moscone South. It was designed by a team at Hellmuth, Obata & Kassabaum led by Bill Valentine. The exhibition hall was placed underground to minimize the controversial convention center's visible footprint.

Moscone Center was developed by The Rouse Company as part of the main Yerba Buena Gardens development, in partnership with the San Francisco Redevelopment Authority.

Moscone Center was featured in the 1995 movie The Net, with Sandra Bullock.

The expansion of Moscone North and Moscone West in 1992 and 2003, designed by Gensler with Hunt Construction Group as the general contractor, added an additional 600,000 square feet (56,000 m^{2}) to its original 300,000 square feet (28,000 m^{2}) of exhibit space.

Moscone North and South underwent a two-year renovation project that was completed in 2012. The renewal project was designed by HOK, the center's original architect. A $551 million expansion project is underway, which was scheduled for completion in December 2018. The aboveground portions of Moscone South have been demolished and replaced by a more spacious structure. Moscone North was also renovated. The expansion project was designed by Skidmore, Owings & Merrill in collaboration with Mark Cavagnero Associates.

Since the onset of the COVID-19 pandemic in March 2020, Moscone Center has struggled to fill its event calendar. Moscone hosted approximately 36 events in 2023 and 22 events in 2024. Some conferences did go forward as scheduled at Moscone Center, only to decide that they will not come back. For example, the American College of Surgeons went forward with its annual meeting in October 2024 and then decided afterwards, without disclosing the reason, that it would not return to San Francisco in 2029 as originally scheduled. In general, San Francisco's "high hotel and booking costs have been cited as challenges, along with concerns over street conditions". The Moscone Center was the site of the NFL's 2026 Pro Bowl Games, a flag football contest between teams representing the AFC and NFC, on February 3, 2026 as part of the event's shift to being held the week of the Super Bowl (with 2026's game being held in Santa Clara's Levi's Stadium).

== Facilities ==
The Moscone Center complex consists of three main halls:

- Moscone South is located to the south of Howard Street. It is three stories tall. It opened in 2017, replacing the original Moscone Center building that opened in 1981. A Keith Haring sculpture stands outside the hall at the corner of 3rd and Howard streets.
- Moscone North is located to the north of Howard Street.
- Moscone West is a three-level exhibition hall located across 4th Street from Moscone North.

Moscone North and South are connected by a pedestrian bridge over Howard Street, as well as by the underground exhibition hall, which extends far beyond the aboveground structures and beneath Yerba Buena Gardens and the Metreon entertainment center. The massive underground hall has been described as a bunker. Together, Moscone North and South have 504,000 square feet (46,800 m^{2}) of contiguous exhibition space, two ballrooms, 82 meeting rooms, and 107,000 square feet (9,900 m^{2}) of pre-function lobby space.

A large solar electricity system was installed on the roof of the center in March 2004 by PowerLight Corporation. The installation of this system marked San Francisco's first major step towards obtaining all municipal energy from pollution-free sources. With the 60,000-square-foot (5,600 m^{2}) solar array (675 kW capacity) in place, San Francisco boasts one of the largest city-owned solar installations in the country. The electricity generated by the solar system, combined with savings from energy efficiency measures, delivers the equivalent energy to power approximately 8,500 homes.

The location of the complex in the South of Market area provides easy access to downtown San Francisco's many hotels and restaurants, as well as major transportation systems. The Yerba Buena/Moscone station, in the southwestern corner of the convention center complex, provides access to the Muni Metro, which connects to Caltrain. The center is also two blocks away from the Powell Street station, which is served by both BART and the Metro.

Labor organizations supported the construction of the center, and were granted full labor jurisdiction. All labor in the Convention Center is performed by I.A.T.S.E. Local 16 Stagehands, Sign and Display Workers Local #510, Brotherhood of Teamsters local #65, IBEW Local #6, Security I.A.T.S.E. Local #B-18, Communications Workers of America, and the Hotel & Restaurant Workers Local #2. IUOE Local #39 provides Engineering Services. Projection Presentation Technology is the on-site rental service.

== Events ==
Moscone Center hosts many large events each year. During the 2016–17 season, Moscone Center hosted 74 events with a total attendance of 1,021,031.

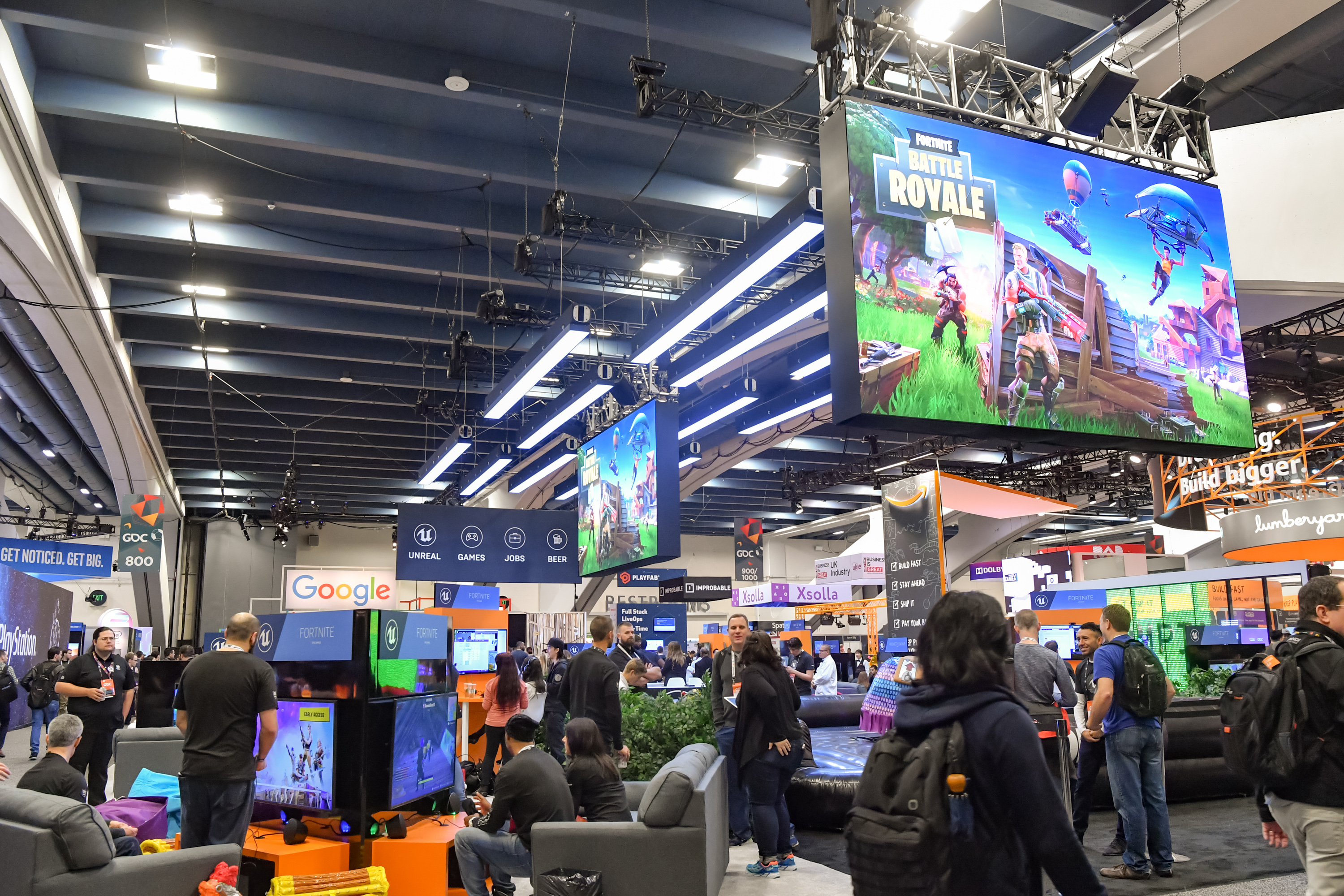
The Fortnite Battle Royale booth at the 2018 Game Developers Conference

Moscone Center hosts a number of annual professional gatherings, including:

=== Present ===
- American Bar Association annual meeting
- Dreamforce (since 2005)
- Game Developers Conference (2005, 2007–)
- Oracle OpenWorld (since 1997)
- Pacific Coast Builders Conference
- RSA Conference (2001, 2003–2005, 2007–)
- SEMICON West (since 1992)
- Winter Fancy Food Show
- SPIE Photonics West

In addition, Moscone Center hosts public gated events such as the SF Auto Show and the Fancy Foods Show.

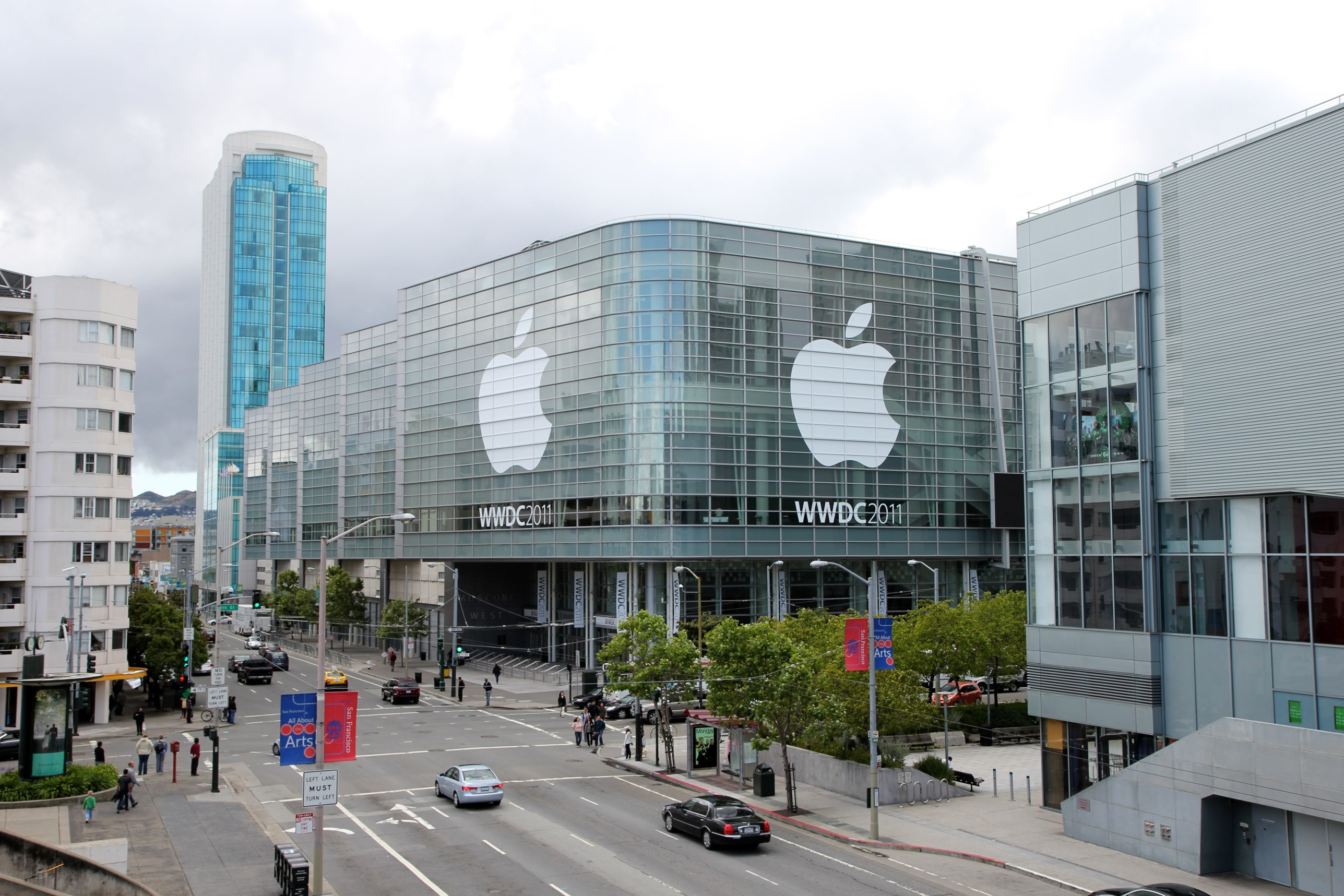
Moscone West during the 2011 Apple Worldwide Developers Conference

=== Past ===
- American Geophysical Union fall meeting (until 2016)
- Apple Worldwide Developers Conference (2003–2016)
- Google I/O (2008–2015)
- JavaOne (1997–2009, 2017)
- Macworld/iWorld (1985–2014)
- Microsoft Build (2013–2016)
- VMworld (2007, 2009, 2010, 2012–2015, 2019)
- West Coast Computer Faire (1984–1991)
- WonderCon (2003–2011)
- Intel Developer Forum (2002–2016)
- 2026 Pokémon World Championships (August 28–30, 2026)

=== Future ===
- Atlassian Team '27 (April 20-22, 2027)

=== Others ===
Other notable events at the convention center have included:

- 1984 Democratic National Convention, at which the Democratic Party nominated Walter Mondale for President of the United States and Geraldine Ferraro for Vice President, marking the first time a woman had been nominated by a major party for either office
- 1987 National Sports Collectors Convention
- 1992 and 1996 Microsoft Professional Developers Conference
- 1993 World Science Fiction Convention
- 2000 President Bill Clinton spoke in the Esplanade Ballroom and recorded a weekly radio address in the Green Room
- 2009 OpenSource World
- 2015 TwitchCon
- 2015 PlayStation Experience
- 2015 Capcom Cup
- 2016 NFL Experience
- 2016 North American International Auto Show
- 2017 GMSA Mobile World Congress Americas
- 2026 Pro Bowl Games

== See also ==
- Bill Graham Civic Auditorium
- 49-Mile Scenic Drive
- Roger Boas
- List of convention centers in the United States
