= Catherine Wagner (artist) =

American artist

- Born: January 31, 1953 (age 73); San Francisco, California, United States of America
- Education: San Francisco State University, BA; San Francisco State University, MFA
- Known for: Photography, Visual Art
- Movement: Conceptual art

Catherine Wagner (born January 31, 1953) is an American photographer, professor and conceptual artist. Wagner has created large-scale, site-specific public artworks for the cities of San Francisco, Los Angeles, San Jose, and Kyoto, Japan. Her work is represented in major national and international collections, including those of the Museum of Modern Art, New York; the Los Angeles County Museum of Art; the San Francisco Museum of Modern Art; the Whitney Museum of American Art, New York; and the Museum of Fine Arts, Houston. Wagner's process involves the investigation of what art critic David Bonetti called "the systems people create, our love of order, our ambition to shape the world, the value we place on knowledge, and the tokens we display to express ourselves." In addition to being a practicing artist, Wagner has been a professor of art at Mills College in Oakland, California, since 1979. She received the Rome Prize in 2013, a Guggenheim Fellowship, National Endowment for the Arts Fellowships and the Ferguson Award.

== Early career ==
Wagner began her photographic career with Early California Landscapes, photographs of the rapid development of California in the mid-seventies. Mark Johnstone sees in this work "a purity of line, form and shape, [that] are exercised with great clarity, and exemplify her long standing fascination with the materials of architecture." In her departure from the tradition of landscape photography and an imbued interest in constructed, gritty, urban, and even architectural environments rather than natural or sublime environs, Wagner's early works fall within the New Topographics genre which originated in the 1975 show entitled New Topographics: Photographs of a Man-Altered Landscape, rather than photographers of the American West such as Ansel Adams, Carleton Watkins, and Timothy H. O'Sullivan.

Wagner has similarly dealt with built environments from the classroom to the theme park in projects including: Moscone Center (1978), American Classroom (1986), Home and Other Stories (1992), Disney’s Theme Parks: The Architecture of Reassurance (1995), and New Orleans World Exposition (1984–85).

For Home and Other Stories, Wagner photographed the people's home interiors, cataloging individual domestic spaces—refrigerator shelves, bedrooms, foyers, and laundry rooms—without the homeowner in frame. Each home was presented as a photographic triptych. The images display evidence of the occupant's identity from the perspective of an outsider. The series was exhibited at the Los Angeles County Museum of Art in 1993.

== Mid-career ==
Art & Science: Investigating Matter examined both the laboratories in which scientific research takes place and the materials and instruments native to these environments, such as fruit flies, chemicals, beakers, test tubes, and flasks. The typology of twelve photographs of freezers, -86 Degree Freezer (12 Areas of Concern and Crisis), portrays the isolated subjects of critical scientific research in human health.

Art & Science: Investigating Matter was followed by a series of projects creating parallels between cultural and subjective frameworks of research and the humanities: Museum Pieces (1999), Cross Sections (2001), and Trilogy: Reflections on Frankenstein, the Arctic Circle, and the History of Science (2003). In these works, Wagner photographs the tools and materials used in museums and galleries in a manner that parallels the precision in the scientific study of objects.

In 2001, Wagner further explored the impact of science on culture and notions of artistic accountability. Cross Sections employed the use of medical imaging devices such as the MRI and the scanning electron microscope to photograph familiar organic materials such as corncobs, pumpkins, and shark teeth. Wagner expanded upon this project to create an installation, Pomegranate Wall, consisting of ten 4 by 8 foot light boxes of duplicated MRI scans of pomegranates, and the permanent public art piece at the University of California, San Francisco, Cell Wall II.

In A Narrative History of the Lightbulb, Wagner arranges her lightbulb subjects in a fabrication created for the sole purpose of photographing. This process "borrows from the rich history of the still life with a keen eye toward Giorgio Morandi, utilizing similar strategies of grouping familiar objects in beautiful, compelling installations." Lightbulbs are arranged by color in Ode to Yves and Green Energy; by technological advancement in Early Tungsten and Carbon Filaments 1900–1910; and by era in The Lamps of 1900 and The 1890s.

In creating Re-classifying History, Wagner was given access to the storage facilities of the M. H. de Young Memorial Museum in San Francisco, during the remodeling of the venue by Herzog & de Meuron. Diverse organizational principles – sometimes playful – were utilized to alter the collection at random and without reference to chronology.

As an artist-in-residence at the California Academy of Sciences in San Francisco, Wagner constructed massive photographic panels composed of the plants and insects that inhabited the San Francisco Bay Area 300 million years ago. Of this work, Hearne Pardee writes, "Wagner elevates sensory pleasure to an aesthetic plane by insisting on the work of nature in itself, setting the stage for an old-fashioned sense of wonder."

== Public art ==
Wagner's public art began with a commission to create skins for the interior of Comme des Garçons in Kyoto, Japan. For this project, Wagner used her photographs from -86 Degree Freezers (12 Areas of Concern and Crisis) to clad the walls of the space from the showroom floor to the dressing rooms.

Cell Wall II, depicting cells dividing, was created to line the courtyard of the University of California San Francisco's Medical School. Swimmer’s Waves (2008), created for the Sava Pool in San Francisco and designed by Mark Cavagnero Associates. The work depicts light reflected and amplified by waves and wakes created by the movement of swimmers.

For the new civic auditorium of the Los Angeles Police Department headquarters in downtown Los Angeles, Wagner created Ghost Grove (2009). Along the interior walls of the auditorium, Wagner photographically etched anodized aluminum with images of an orange grove, which once covered all of downtown Los Angeles and the greater Southern California sprawl.

Wagner's public art work for the Moscone Station of San Francisco's new Central Subway, Moscone Center consists of photographs of the 1970s and 1980s incorporated into the concourse and head house of the station. The photographs are laser engraved onto massive grey granite panels, resting on the very site from which they were originally made. David Johnstone writes of this work, "The images evoke a range of responses, from serene meditation to analytical observation, and mark the shifting artistic, political, social, and economic values represented by the construction on this piece of real estate."

== Awards, collections, and publications ==
Wagner received a Guggenheim Fellowship in 1987. Wagner was also named one of Time Magazine's Fine Arts Innovators of the Year in 2001. She was a 2013 Rome Prize fellow.

Her work is represented in the collections of the Museum of Modern Art, New York; the Whitney Museum of American Art; the Art Institute of Chicago; the Metropolitan Museum of Art; the Los Angeles County Museum of Art (LACMA); the San Francisco Museum of Modern Art (SFMOMA); the Museum of Fine Arts, Houston; the Museum of Folkswang, Essen, Germany; and the Victoria and Albert Museum, London.

Her monographs include Cross Sections (Twin Palms Press, 2002), Art & Science: Investigating Matter (Washington University, 1996), Home and Other Stories (Los Angeles County Museum of Art, 1993), and American Classroom (Museum of Fine Arts, Houston, 1988).
