= Community School of Music and Arts at Finn Center =

Art school in Mountain View, California

Coordinates: 37.408005°N 122.11082°W

The Community School of Music and Arts (CSMA) was founded in Mountain View, California, in 1968. The school is now the largest non-profit provider of art and music education programs in both Santa Clara and San Mateo Counties.

CSMA is Northern California's largest non-profit provider of arts education programs and, with a $6 million budget and 160-member staff and faculty, it is one of the ten largest community schools in the United States. Located in Silicon Valley, CSMA is dedicated to making the arts and arts education accessible to all, regardless of age, experience or background. Headquartered in the Finn Center in the City of Mountain View, CSMA directly serves over 22,000 people of all ages, skill levels and economic means each year, including over 16,000 students at 40+ schools in San Mateo and Santa Clara Counties.

CSMA is a 501(c)3 non-profit organization, and is a member of the National Guild for Community Arts Education.

== About Finn Center ==
Finn Center is CSMA's first permanent home. Opened in January 2004, it is an $11.7 million, 25,000-square-foot (2,300 m^{2}) building housing 17 music studios, classrooms, a ceramics studio, a digital arts lab, a teacher resource center, a recital hall, the 200-seat Tateuchi Hall for concerts, and exhibition space in Mohr Gallery. The building was designed by Mark Cavagnero Associates, and has received awards for design excellence (American Institute of Architects, Architectural Record, and Business Week.)
