= California Film Institute =

US non-profit organization

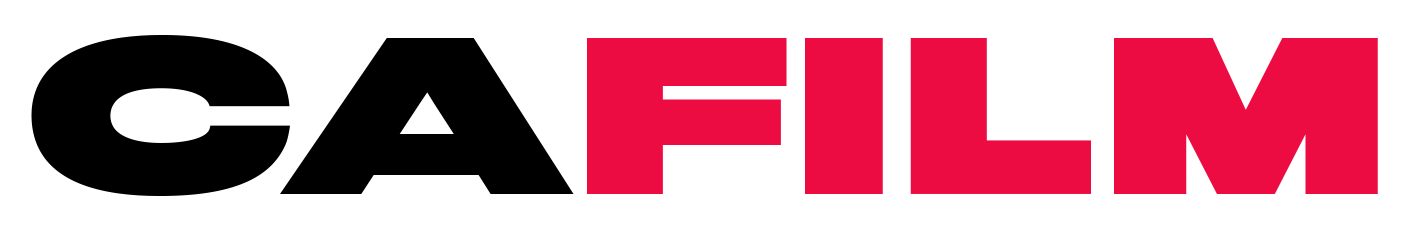
- Founded: 1978
- Founder: Mark Fishkin
- Type: Film organization
- Location: San Rafael, California, United States
- Website: www.cafilm.org

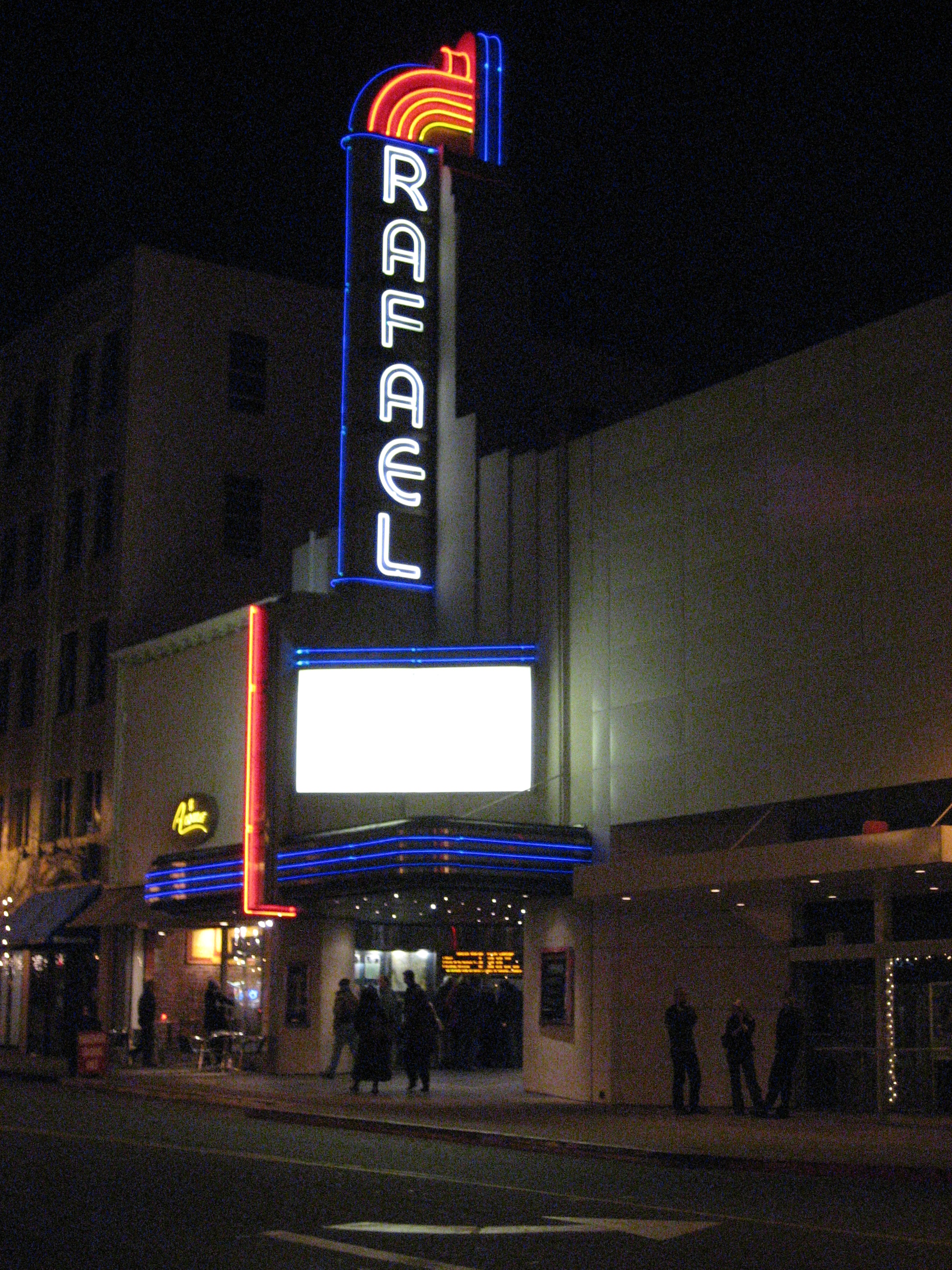
Christopher B. Smith Rafael Film Center on 4th Street in San Rafael, California

The California Film Institute (CFI) is a non-profit film exhibition organization based in San Rafael, California. The organization exhibits films year-round at the Christopher B. Smith Rafael Film Center and the Sequoia Theatre, presents the annual Mill Valley Film Festival and DOCLANDS Documentary Film Festival, and runs the CFI Education Program.

The executive director and founder of CFI is Mark Fishkin.

== Mill Valley Film Festival ==
Founded in 1978 by Mark Fishkin, the festival is held every October and screens over 200 US and international films for over 70,000 participants.

== Christopher B. Smith Rafael Film Center ==
The Rafael Film Center is a non-profit independent three-screen arthouse theater located in downtown San Rafael, California. It has been owned and operated by the California Film Institute since 1999. The venue exhibits first-run independent and studio films, documentaries, classics, retrospectives, and world cinema, and hosts special events with filmmakers from the Bay Area and from around the world. The Film Center annually serves approximately 200,000 attendees.

== Sequoia Theatre ==
In 2018 CFI purchased the Sequoia Theatre, a historic theater built originally in 1929. At the time it was being run by the Cinemark Theatres chain, leased from the heirs of the Blumenfeld Theaters family. CFI paid $2.5 million to take ownership of the theater. In 2022, they announced plans to add additional theaters below ground, but have not yet begun that renovation. The theater officially reopened on May 20, 2024, with celebratory screenings of classics films for $1 admission.
