= Weill Institute for Neurosciences =

US research and care center

The UCSF Weill Institute for Neurosciences is a neuroscience research and clinical care center at the University of California, San Francisco (UCSF). It was established in 2016 through a $185 million gift from Joan and Sanford I. Weill and the Weill Family Foundation. The institute is housed in the Joan and Sanford I. Weill Neurosciences Building, which opened in October 2021 on UCSF's Mission Bay campus.

== History ==
The institute was founded in 2016 following one of the largest gifts ever made to support neuroscience research in the United States. The $185 million donation came from Joan and Sanford "Sandy" Weill and the Weill Family Foundation. In 2019, the Weills provided an additional $106 million to launch the Weill Neurohub, a research collaboration with UC Berkeley and the University of Washington.

The institute's physical home, the UCSF Weill Neurosciences Building, opened on October 28, 2021. The six-story, 282,500-square-foot, $535 million facility was designed by Mark Cavagnero Associates and won the 2023 Chicago Athenaeum American Architecture Award.
