= Timeline of the San Francisco Bay Area =

This is a timeline of the San Francisco Bay Area in California, events in the nine counties that border on the San Francisco Bay, and the bay itself.

An identical list of events, formatted differently, may be found here.

== Prehistory ==
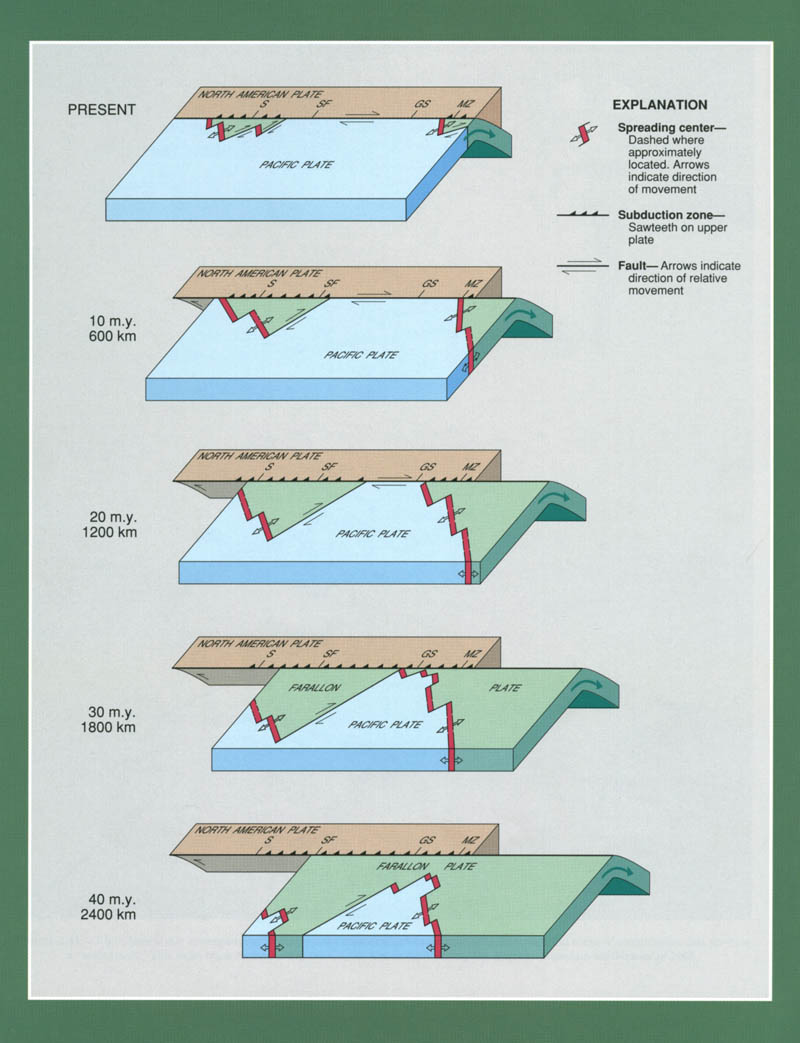
San Andreas Fault

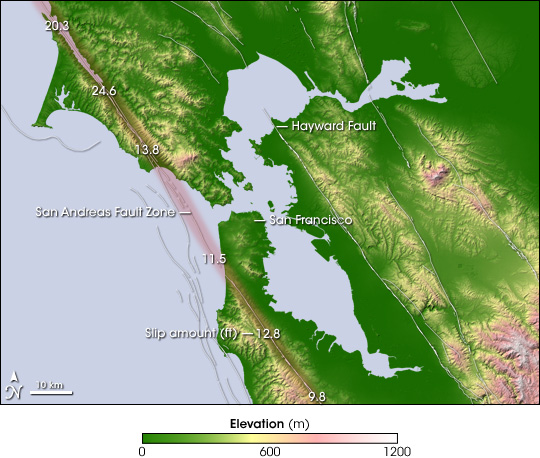
San Andreas Fault in the Bay Area

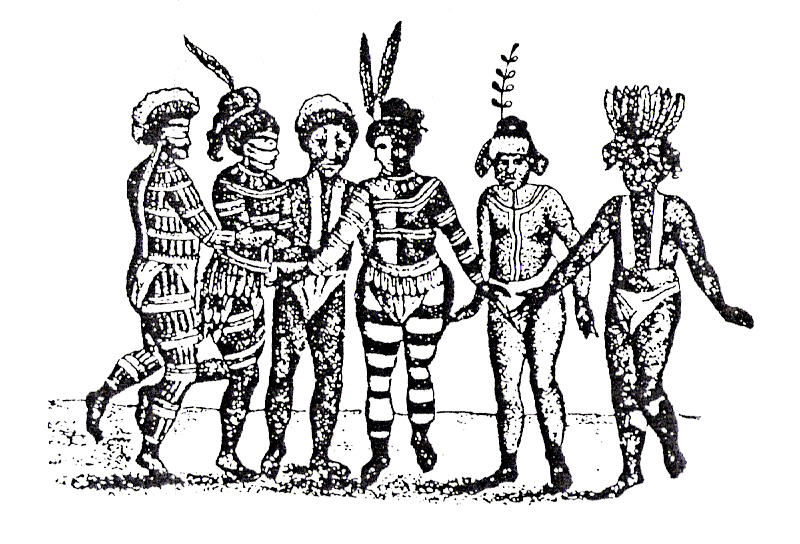
Mission San Jose (Ohlone) people

- The San Andreas Fault (pictured) begins to form in the mid Cenozoic about 30 million years ago
- 9.5 million years ago, the Moraga Volcanics produces most of the lavas that underlie the East Bay ridges from present day Tilden Regional Park to Moraga
- During the Quaternary glaciation beginning 2.58 million years ago, the basin that will be filled by the bay is a large linear valley with small hills, similar to most of the valleys of the Coast Ranges. The rivers of the Central Valley run out to sea through a canyon that will become the Golden Gate. As the ice sheets melt, sea levels rise 300 feet (91 m) over the next 4,000 years, and the valley fills with water from the Pacific.
- A strait was formed about 640,000 to 700,000 years ago, while much of modern California was emerging from an ice age, connecting the inland lake covering Central California with the Pacific Ocean.
- Evidence of human occupation of California dates from at least 17,000 BCE.
- The Ohlone people (pictured) inhabit the Bay Area region as early as 6,000 years ago, with a 1770 estimated population of 10,000–20,000
- The Coast Miwok inhabit the Sonoma and Marin region as early as 4,000 years ago, with a 1770 estimated population of 2,000
- The Patwin people inhabit the northern Bay region as early as 1,500 years ago, with a 1770 estimated population of 12,000
- The Bay Miwok inhabit the region that is now Contra Costa County, with a 1770 estimated population of approximately 1,700

== 16th century ==
- In 1539, Juan Rodríguez Cabrillo lands on islands off the coast of California, and names them Farallones, Spanish for cliffs or small pointed islets
- On 13 November 1542, Juan Rodríguez Cabrillo sights a peninsula from his ship and names it "Cabo de Pinos", while missing the entrance to San Francisco Bay

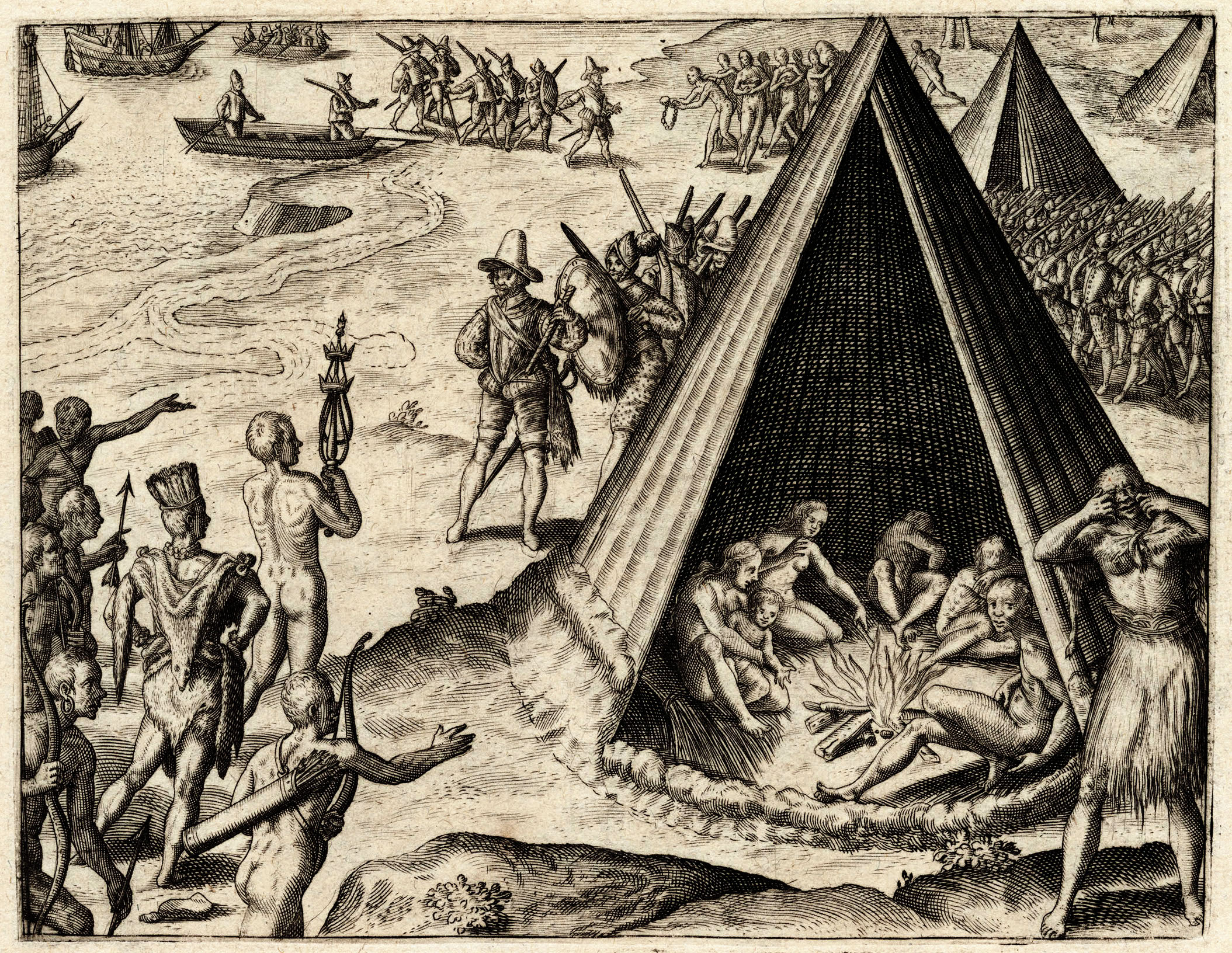
Drake's landing

- Francis Drake lands at what is now known as Drakes Bay in 1579 (pictured), and claims the land for England, as New Albion

== 17th century ==
- Despite annual galleons sailing along the coast from 1565-1769, no ships discover the Golden Gate and the San Francisco Bay, due to factors such as fog, ships avoiding sailing close to shore, and hills making the coast look continuous from a distance.

== 18th century ==
- Las Californias is established in 1768 by New Spain, encompassing the Bay Area
- Gaspar de Portolà arrives in the Bay Area in 1769
- Mission San Francisco de Asís and El Presidio Real de San Francisco are founded in 1776 in Yerba Buena
- Baptisms of the Yelamu by Spanish missionaries begin in 1777
- La Misión Santa Clara de Thamien and el Pueblo de San José de Guadalupe are established in 1777 on the Guadalupe River
- In 1786, Jean-François de Galaup, comte de Lapérouse sails to San Francisco and maps the Bay Area
- In 1792, British explorer George Vancouver stops in San Francisco, in part, according to his journal, to spy on the Spanish settlements in the area

== 19th century ==
1800–1845

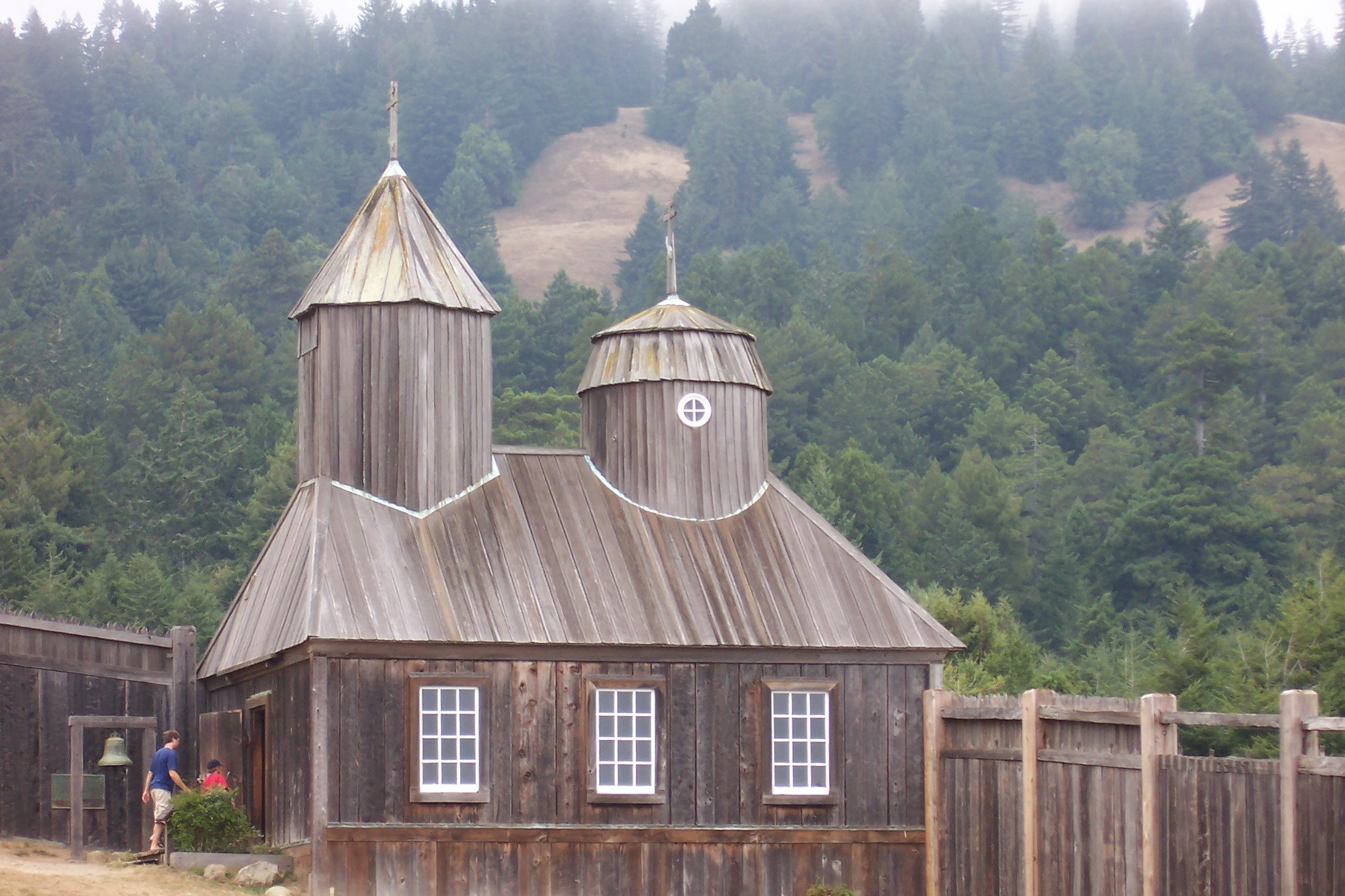
Reconstructed Fort Ross chapel

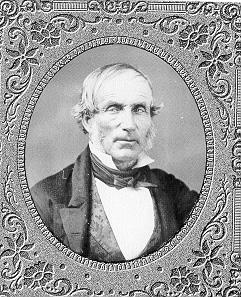
William Richardson

- In 1804, The Bay Area is part of the newly created New Spain state of Alta California
- The Russian-American Company establishes Fortress Ross (Крѣпость Россъ, tr. Krepostʹ Ross) (pictured) in 1812, in what is now Sonoma County
- In 1821, New Spain cedes Alta California, including the Bay Area, to the newly created Mexican Empire
- William A. Richardson (pictured) arrives in San Francisco in 1822, and in 1838 is given Rancho Saucelito in present-day Marin County by Mexican Governor Juan Alvarado
- In 1823, the Bay Area, as part of Alta California, becomes part of the newly founded (Mexico) United Mexican States
- In 1837, Antonio Ortega begins operating a pulqueria (tavern) north of San Francisco, on the former site of Mission San Francisco Solano
- In 1838, a 7.0 M_{La} earthquake strikes the Peninsula, on or near the San Andreas Fault, with a maximum Mercalli intensity of VIII (Severe)
1846

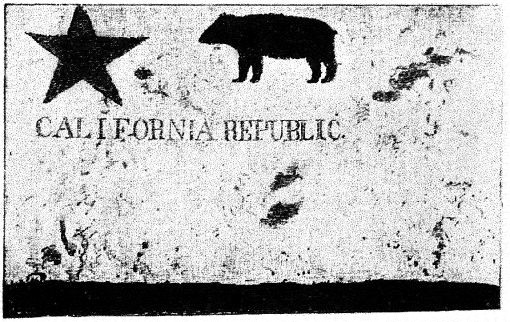
Bear Flag

- Colonists in Alta California rebel against the Mexican department's government, raise a flag featuring a grizzly bear (pictured) at El Cuartel de Sonoma, and establish the short-lived (and unrecognized) California Republic
- US Navy Commodore John D. Sloat claims California for the United States during the Mexican–American War, and US Navy Captain John Berrien Montgomery and US Marine Second Lieutenant Henry Bulls Watson of the USS Portsmouth arrives to claim Yerba Buena two days later by raising the American flag over the town plaza
- Washington Allon Bartlett is named alcalde of Yerba Buena
- Yerba Buena doubles in population when about 240 Mormon pioneers arrive, among them Samuel Brannan
1847

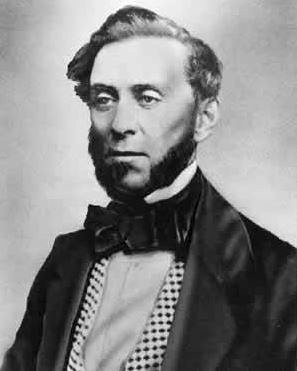
Sam Brannan

- Samuel Brannan's California Star begins publishing in Yerba Buena (Sam Brannan pictured)
- The Californian moves to Yerba Buena from Monterey, shortly after the California Star debuts
- Alcalde Washington Allon Bartlett proclaims that Yerba Buena will henceforth be known as San Francisco
- Nathan Coombs purchases a 325 acres (1.3 km^{2}) farm on Rancho Napa from Salvador Vallejo, and 80 acres (0.3 km^{2}) of Rancho Entre Napa from Nicholas Higuera
1848

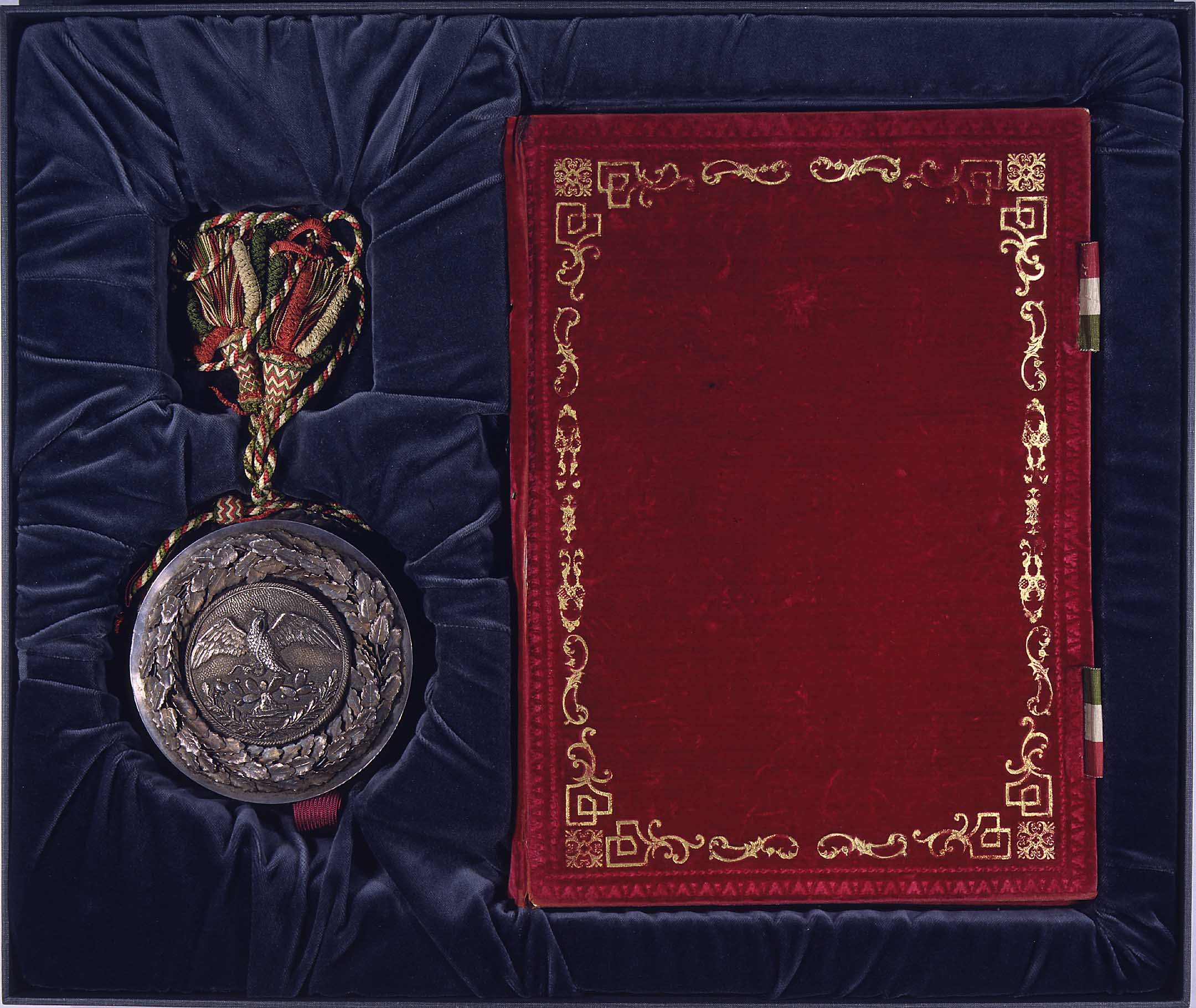
Treaty of Guadalupe Hidalgo

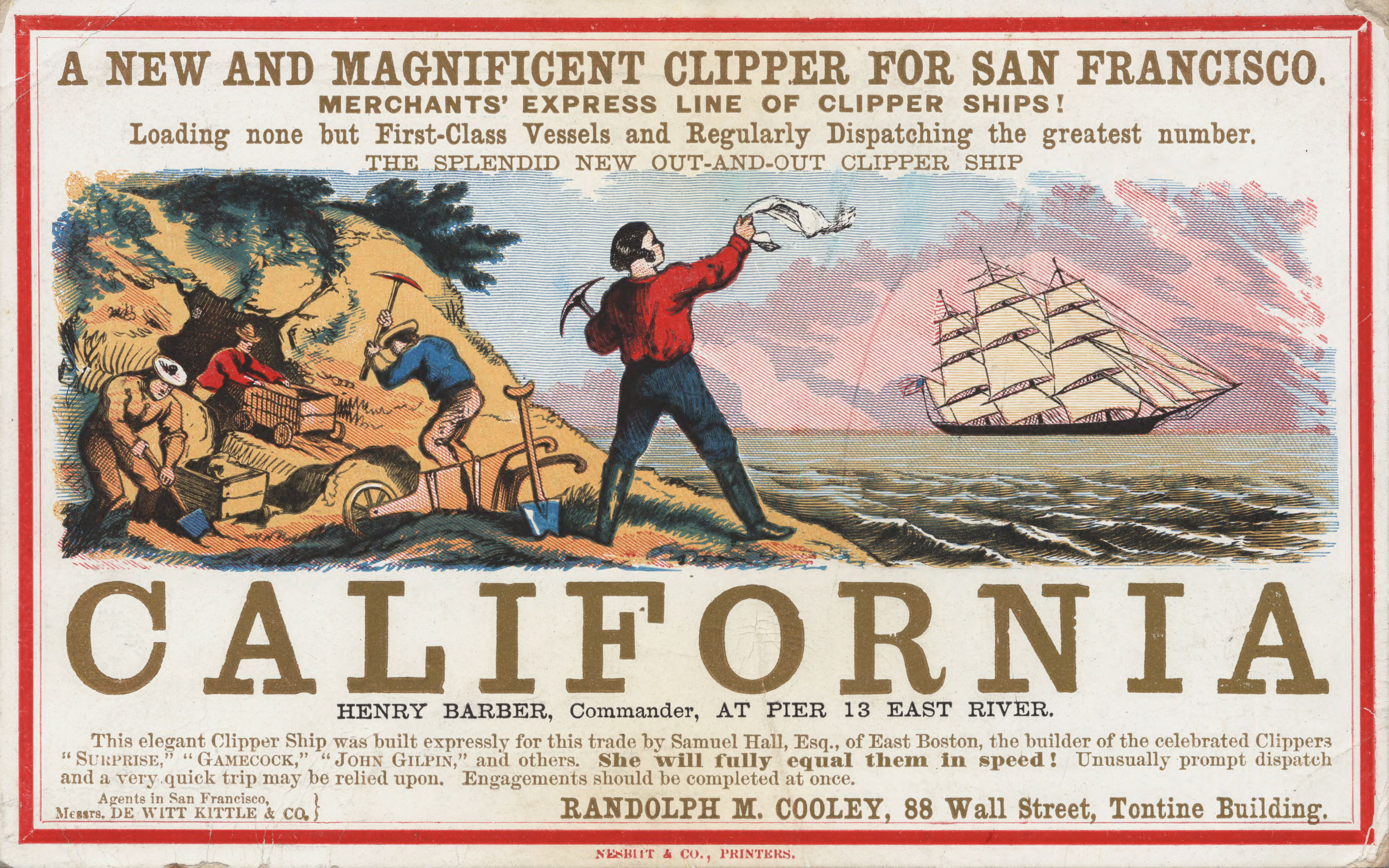
Ad for sea transport to the Gold Rush

• James W. Marshall finds several flakes of gold at a lumber mill he owned in partnership John Sutter, at the bank of the South Fork of the American River, news of which quickly travels around the world (advertisement for transportation to the Gold Rush pictured, right)
• The California Star and the Californian both cease publication in San Francisco due to losing all their staff to the California Gold Rush
• The Treaty of Guadalupe Hidalgo (pictured, left) ends the Mexican–American War, and cedes the territory of California (including the San Francisco Bay Area) to the United States from Mexico
• San Francisco's population is 1,000

1849

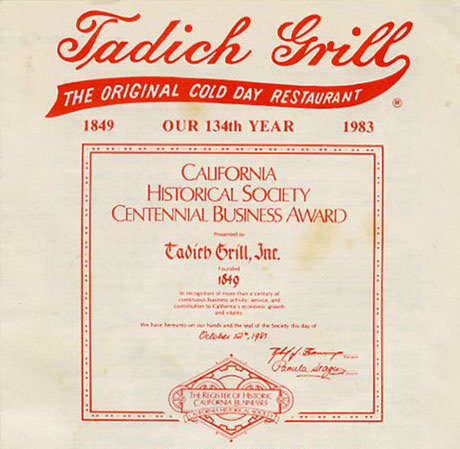
1983 Tadich Grill menu

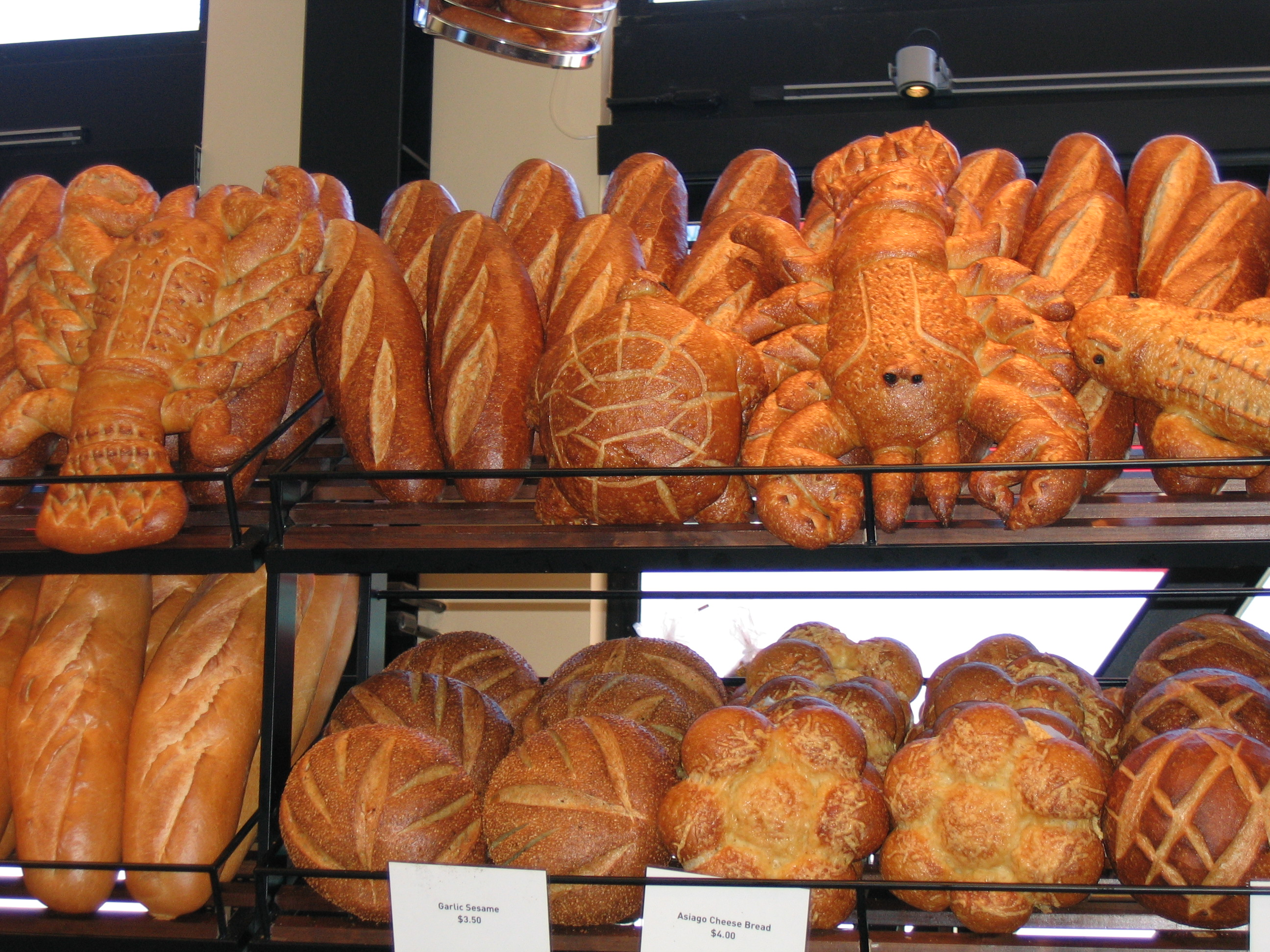
Decorative sourdough bread at Boudin Bakery

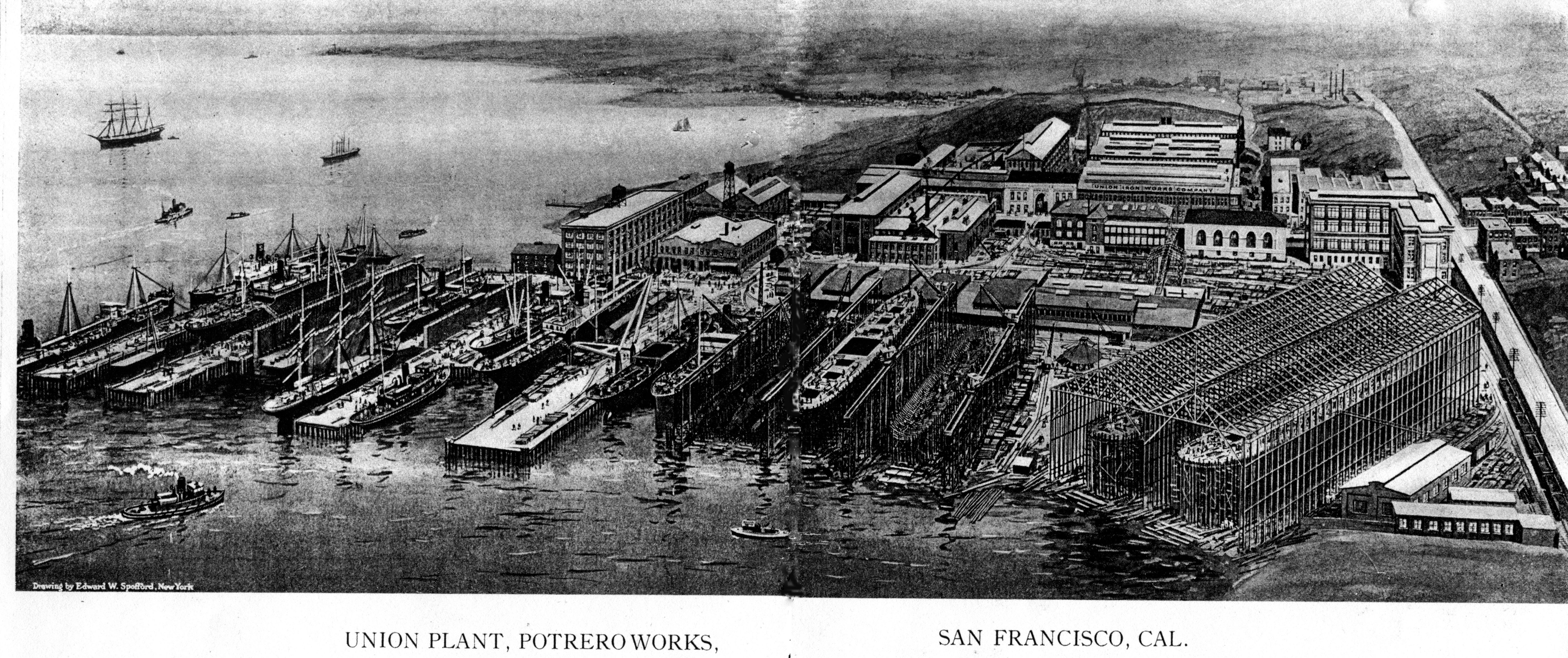
Union Iron Works

• A small coffee stand (1983 menu pictured, left) opens on Clay Street in San Francisco
• Boudin Bakery is established in San Francisco, producing San Francisco sourdough (loaves pictured, right)
• The Alta California begins publishing in San Francisco
• Bayard Taylor visits San Francisco and the Gold Country, writing about the Gold Rush
• The Niantic whaling ship is stranded by its crew on the shore of San Francisco, who desert it to join the Gold Rush
• Irish immigrants Peter and James Donahue found Union Iron Works (pictured) in South of Market, San Francisco
• San Francisco's population is 25,000, an increase by 2,400% from 1848's 1,000

1850

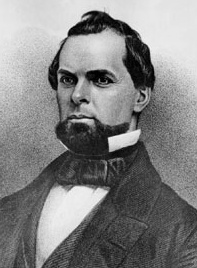
John W. Geary

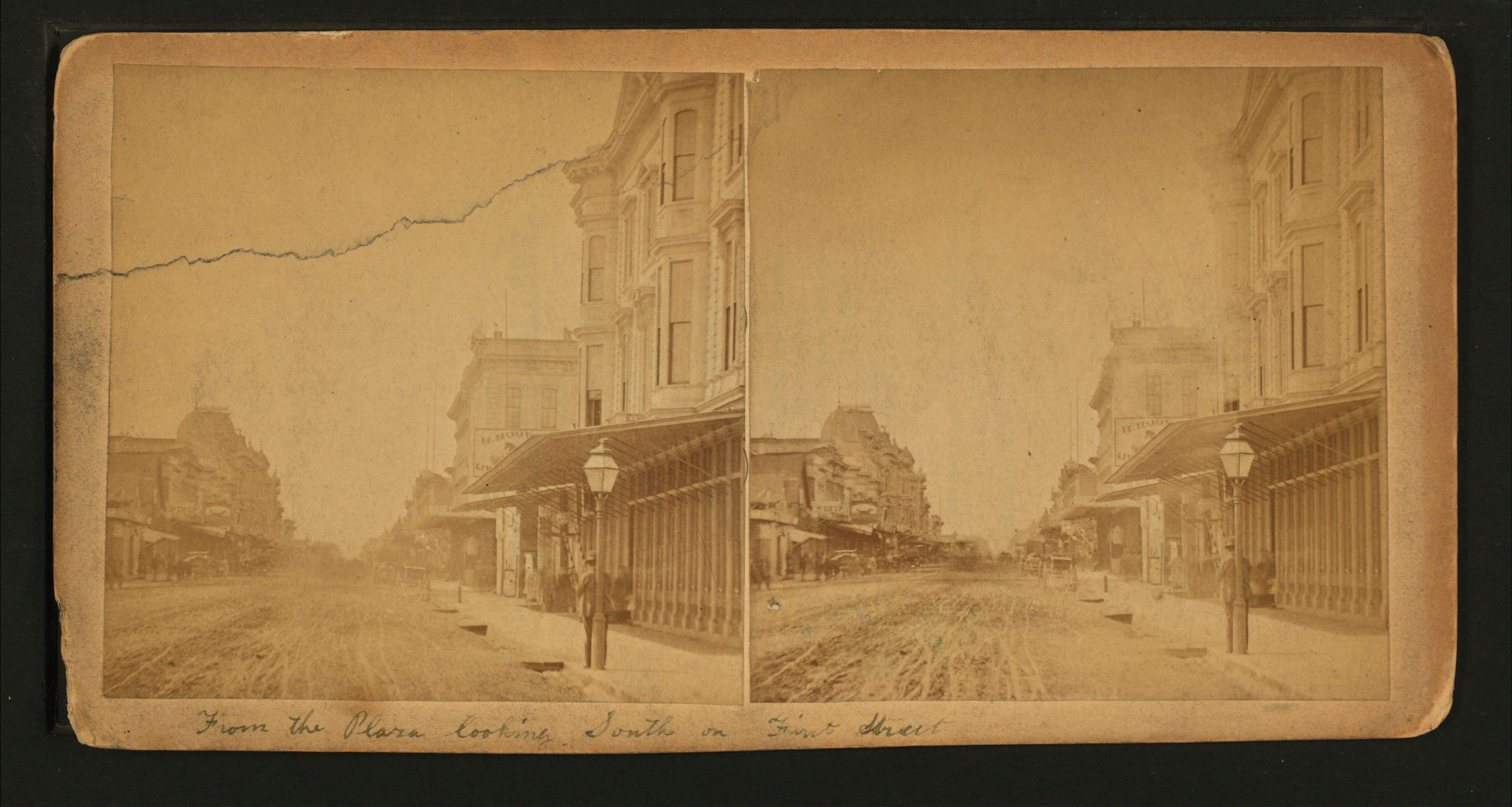
First Street, San Jose, c. 1868–1885

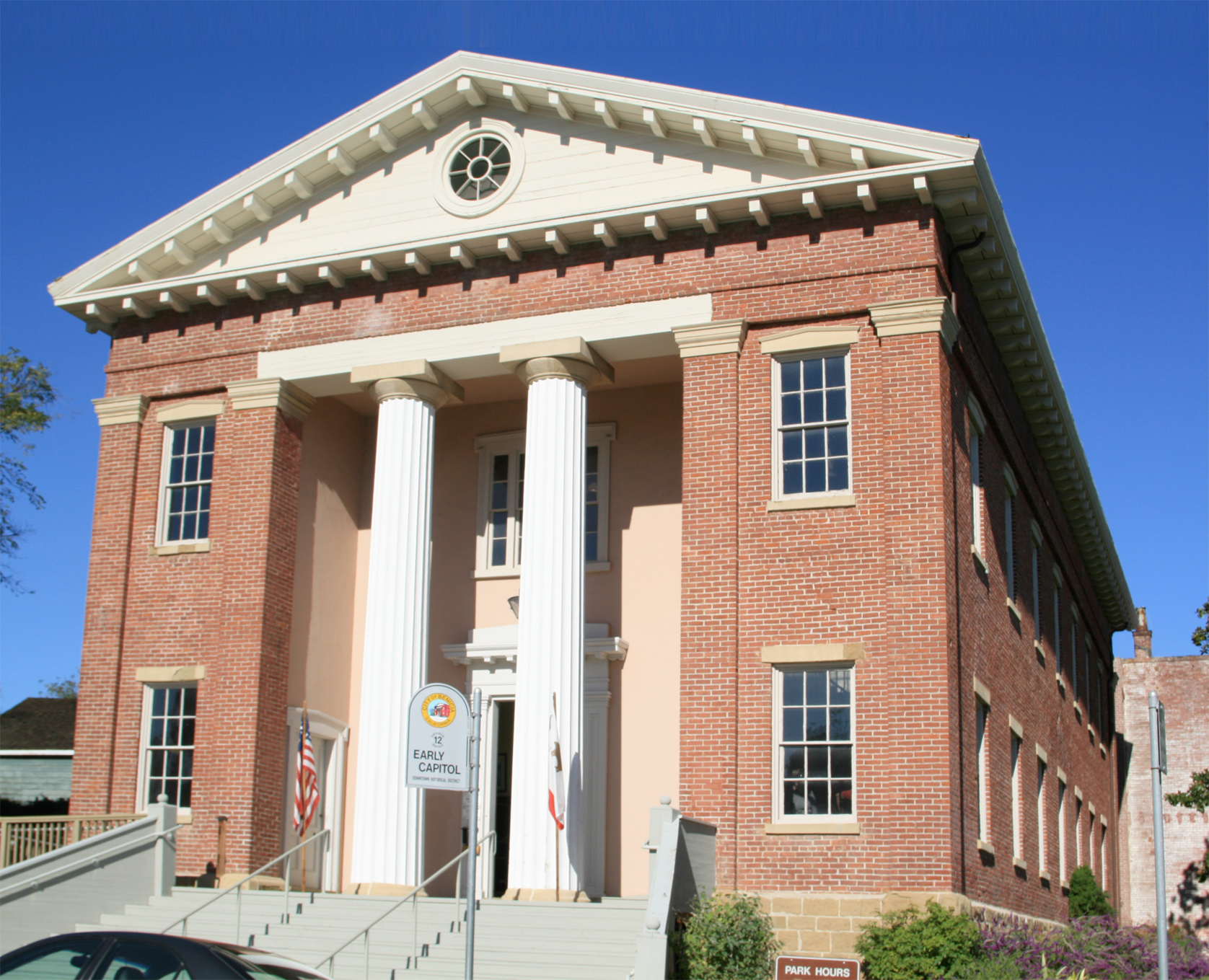
Capitol building, Benicia

- The San Francisco Bay Area is part of the new state of California, which is admitted into the United States of America
- The City and County of San Francisco is incorporated
  - John W. Geary (pictured) becomes the first mayor of San Francisco
- Contra Costa County is incorporated
- Marin County is incorporated
- Napa County is incorporated
- Santa Clara County is incorporated
  - San Jose is incorporated in Santa Clara County (First Street, c. 1868–1885, pictured)
- Solano County is incorporated
  - Benicia is incorporated in Solano County (Benicia's State Capitol building from 1853 pictured)
- Sonoma County is incorporated
1851

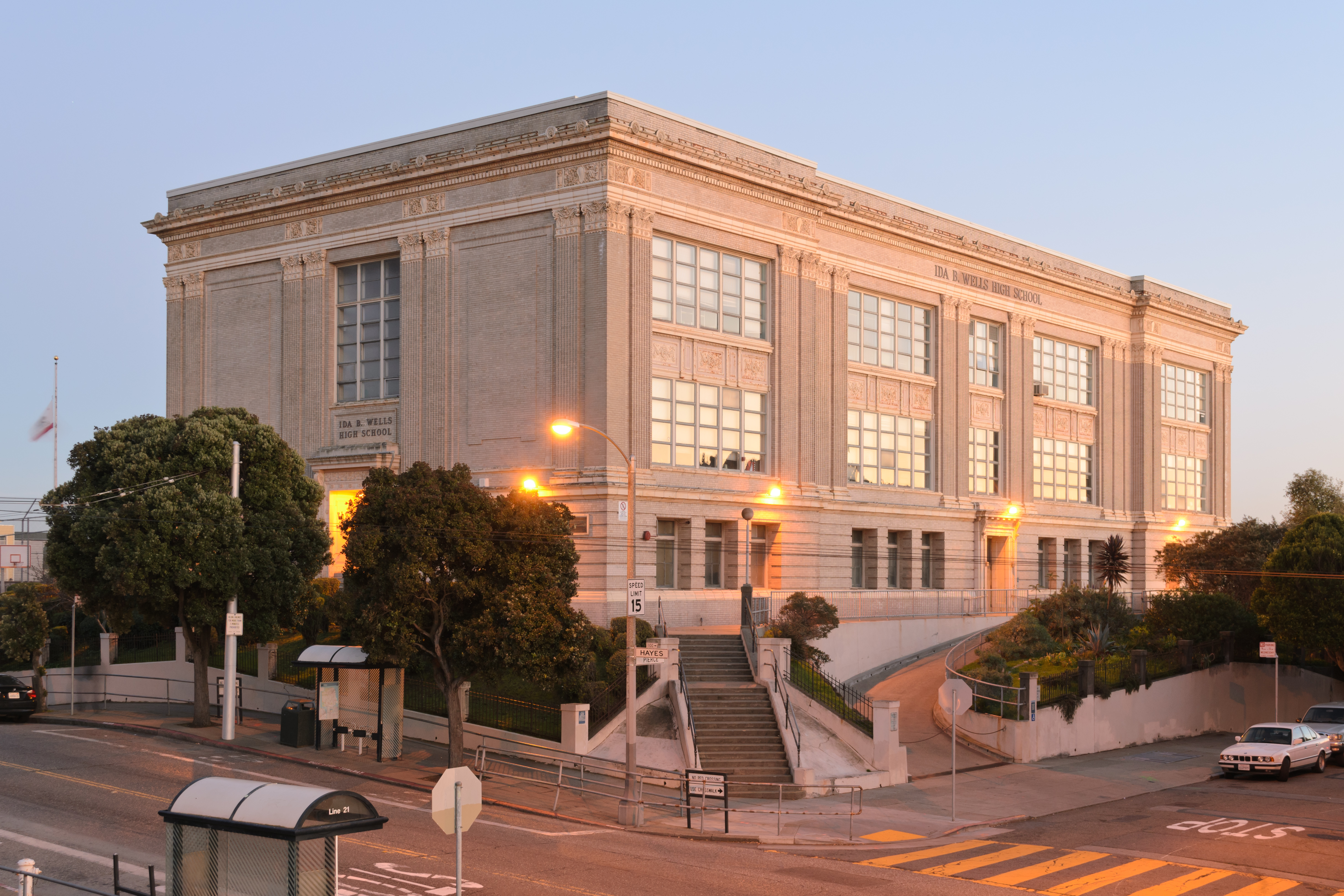
Ida B. Wells High School

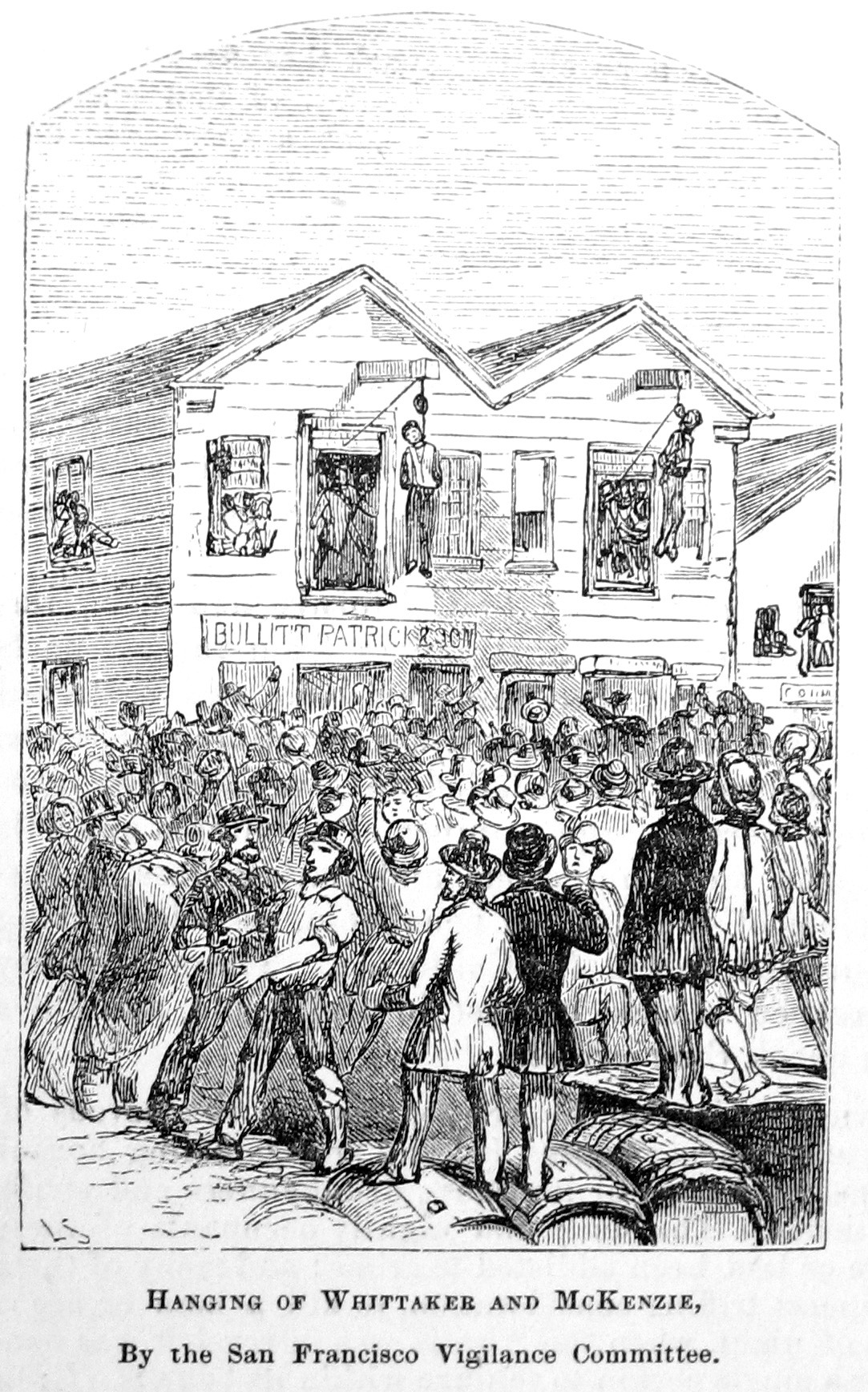
1851 hanging by the Vigilance Committee

• The San Francisco Unified School District is established, as the first public school district in California (historic Ida B. Wells High School building pictured, right)
• The San Francisco Committee of Vigilance is formed in response to rampant crime and corruption in the municipal government (1851 hanging pictured, left)
• Congregation Emanu-El is chartered in San Francisco
• A fire destroys large swaths of San Francisco

1852

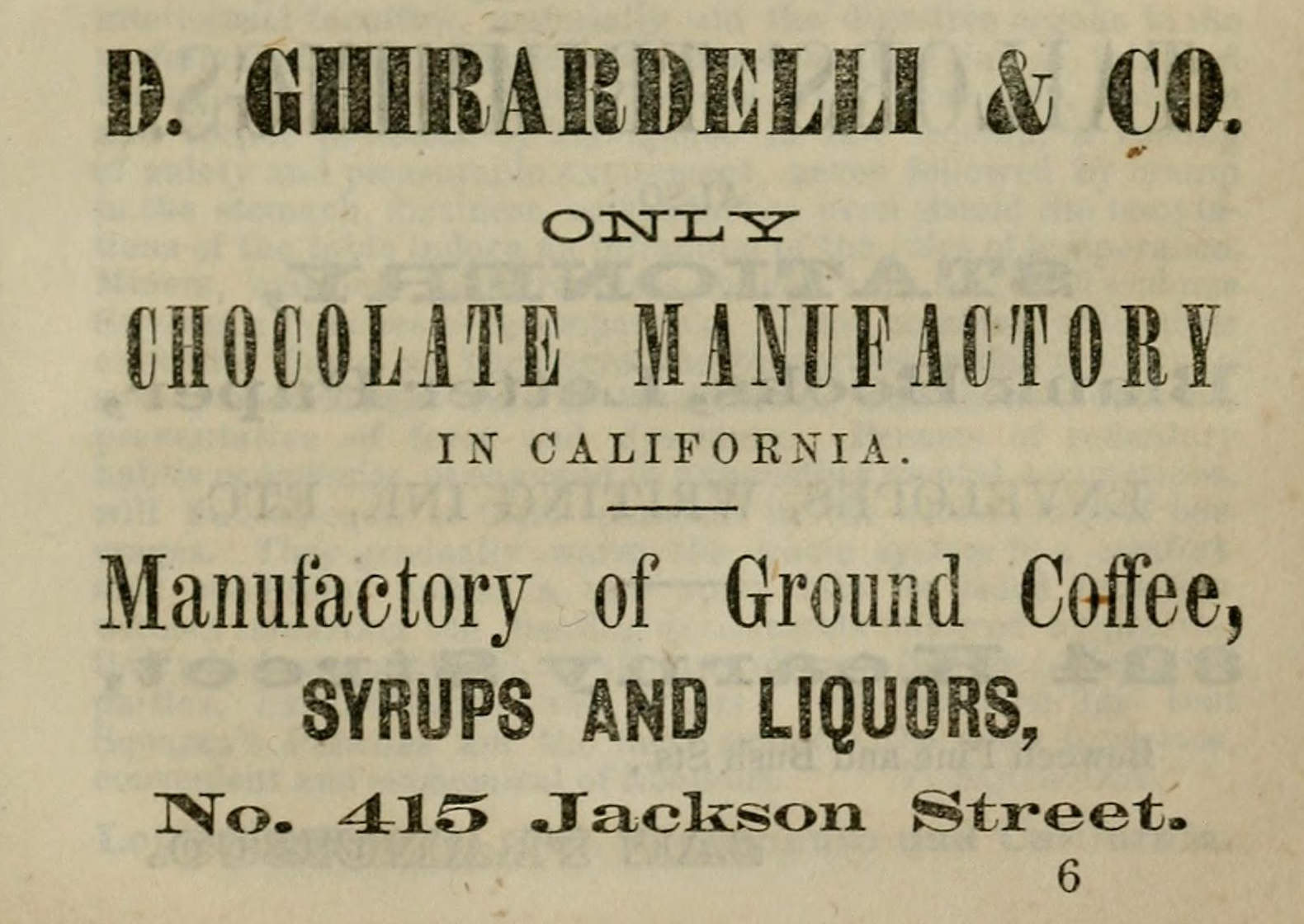
Ghirardelli ad, 1864

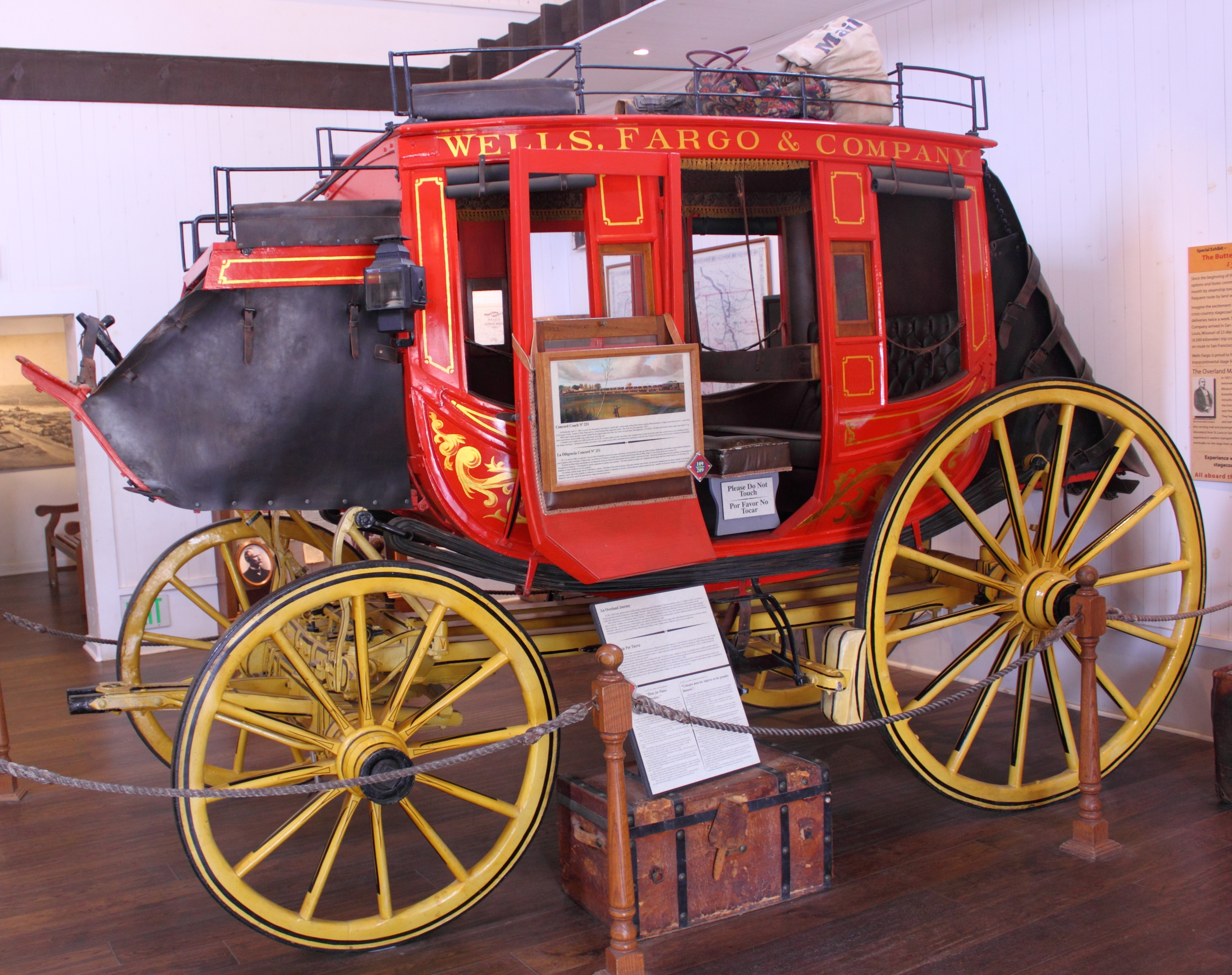
Wells Fargo stagecoach

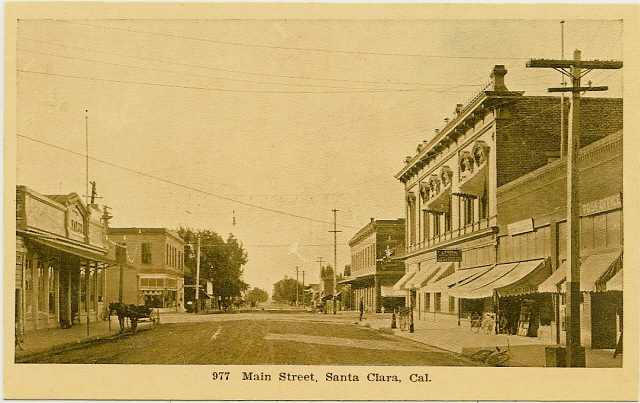
Santa Clara in 1910

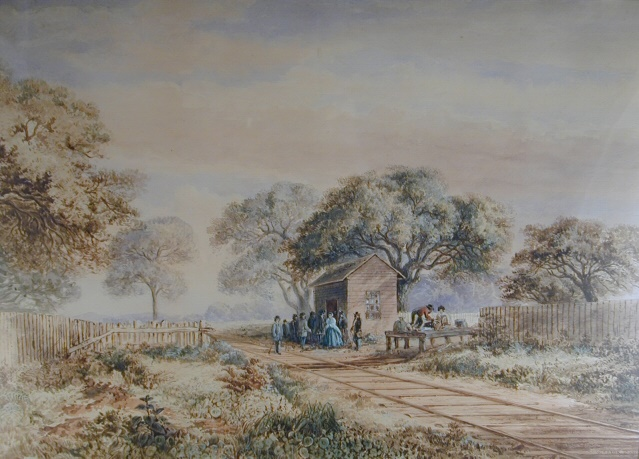
Oakland train depot, 1867

• After opening a number of businesses in Peru and California, Italian chocolatier Domenico Ghirardelli imports 200 pounds of cocoa beans and establishes D. Ghirardelli & Co in San Francisco (1864 advertisement pictured, left)
• Henry Wells and William G. Fargo establish Wells, Fargo & Company in San Francisco, a joint-stock association with an initial capitalization of $300,000, to provide express and banking services (iconic stagecoach pictured, right)
• The city of Santa Clara is incorporated in Santa Clara County (1910 postcard pictured, right)
• Oakland is incorporated in Alameda County (1867 painting shown, right)
• Francis K. Shattuck, George Blake, and two partners they met in the gold fields, William Hillegass and James Leonard, lay claim to four adjoining 160-acre (0.65 km^{2}) strips of land north of Oakland

1853

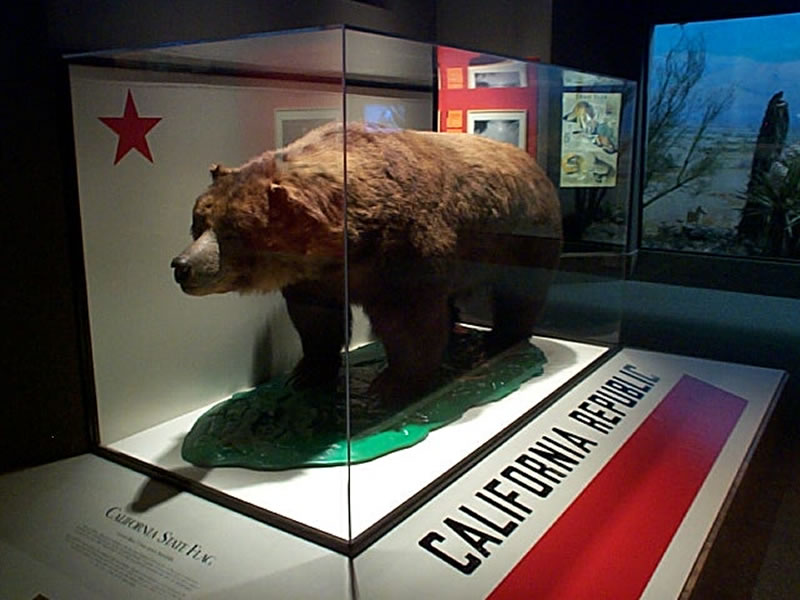
Monarch the bear at the Academy of Sciences

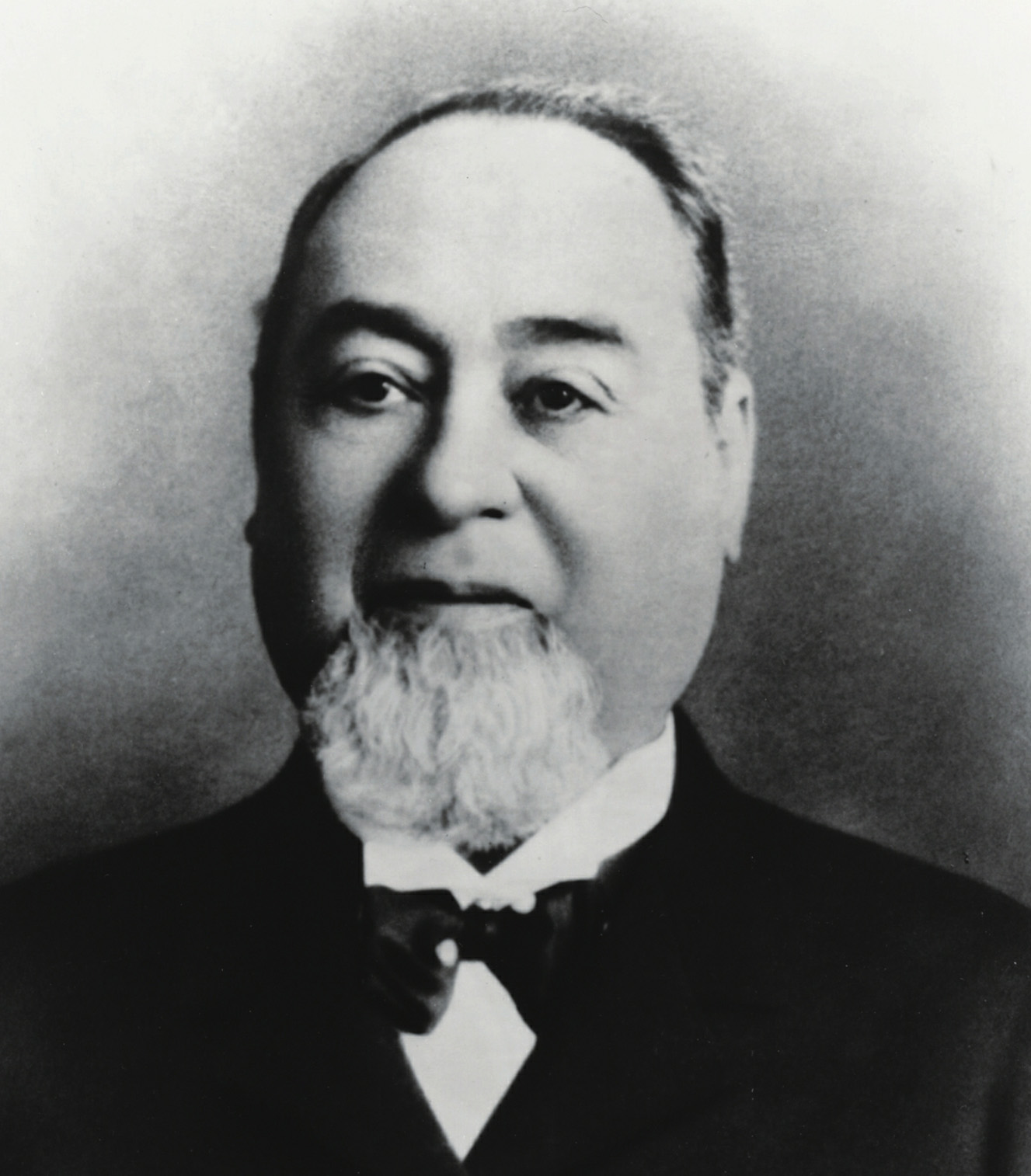
Levi Strauss

• The California Academy of Natural Sciences (modern display pictured, left) is founded in San Francisco
• Levi Strauss & Co. is established when Levi Strauss (pictured, right) arrives from Buttenheim, Bavaria, in San Francisco to open a west coast branch of his brothers' New York dry goods business
• Alameda County is incorporated

1854

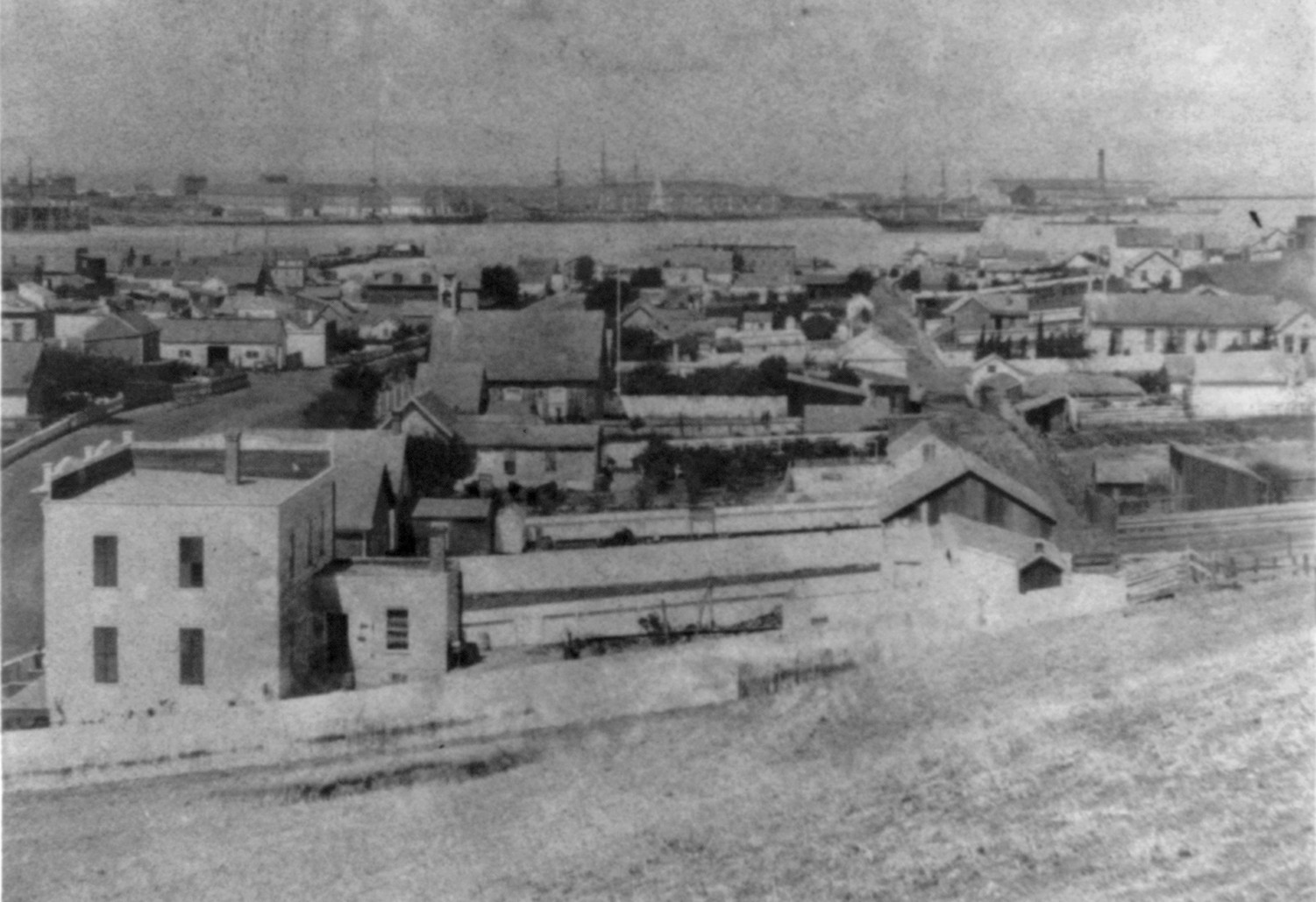
Mare Island Naval Shipyard, 1866

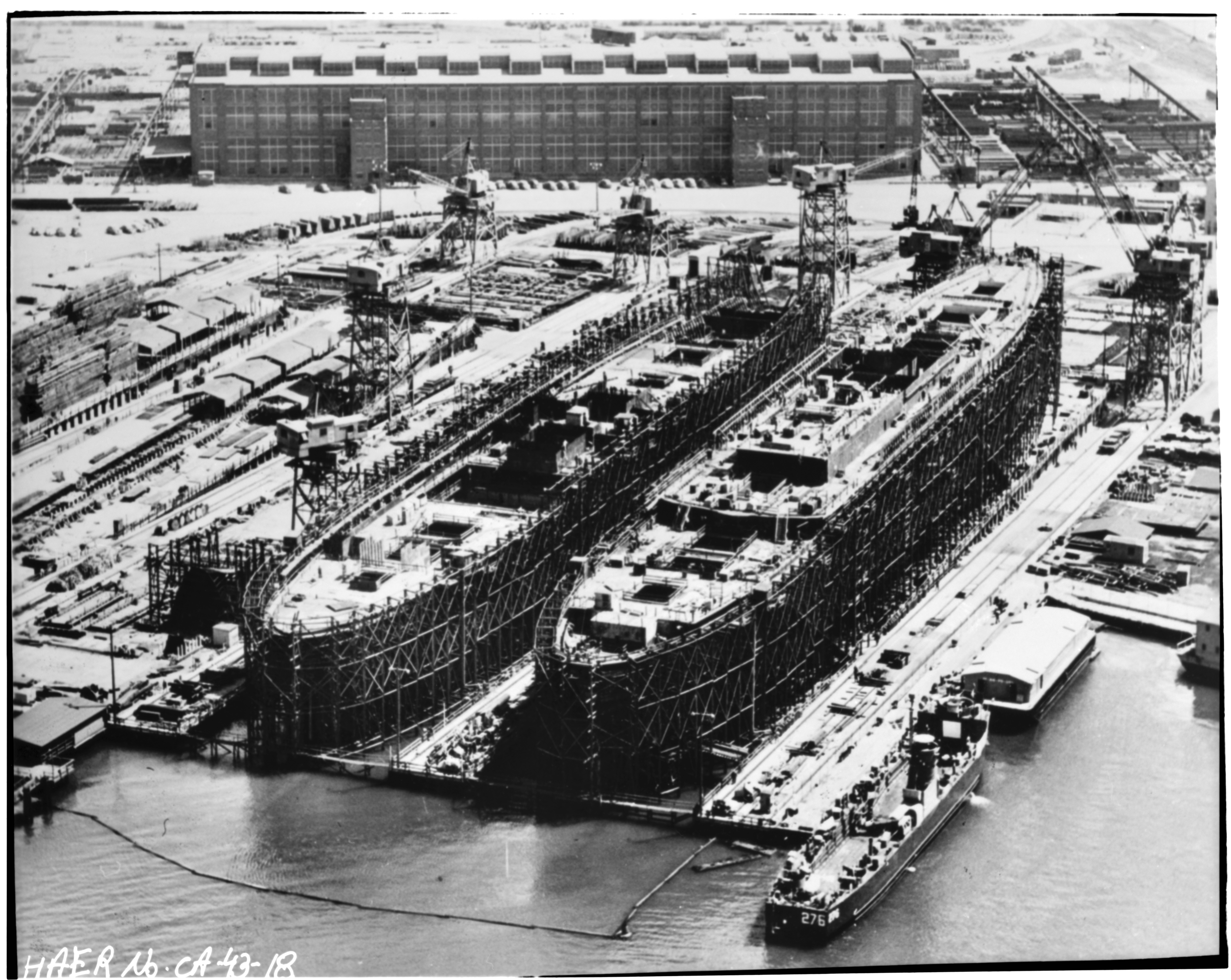
Union Ironworks shipyard, Alameda, c. 1918

• Mare Island Naval Shipyard (pictured, left), the first United States Navy base established on the Pacific Ocean, is established in Vallejo, Solano County
• The Mechanics' Institute Library and Chess Room is founded in San Francisco
• The city of Alameda is incorporated in Alameda County (Alameda Works Shipyard pictured, right)
• The first department store in San Francisco opens: Davidson & Lane, later renamed The White House.

1855

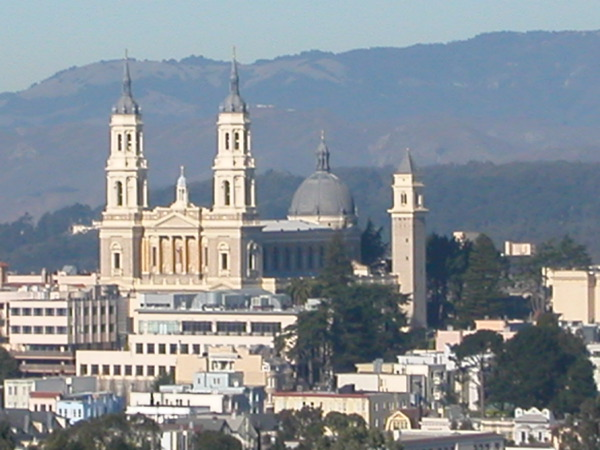
St Ignatius Church

- Saint Ignatius Academy is founded in San Francisco by the Italian Jesuits Rev. Anthony Maraschi, Rev. Joseph Bixio, and Rev. Michael Accolti (present St. Ignatius Church, on campus, pictured)
- With gold only profitably retrieved by medium to large groups of workers, either in partnerships or as employees, the California Gold Rush ends
- The College of California is founded in Oakland
1856

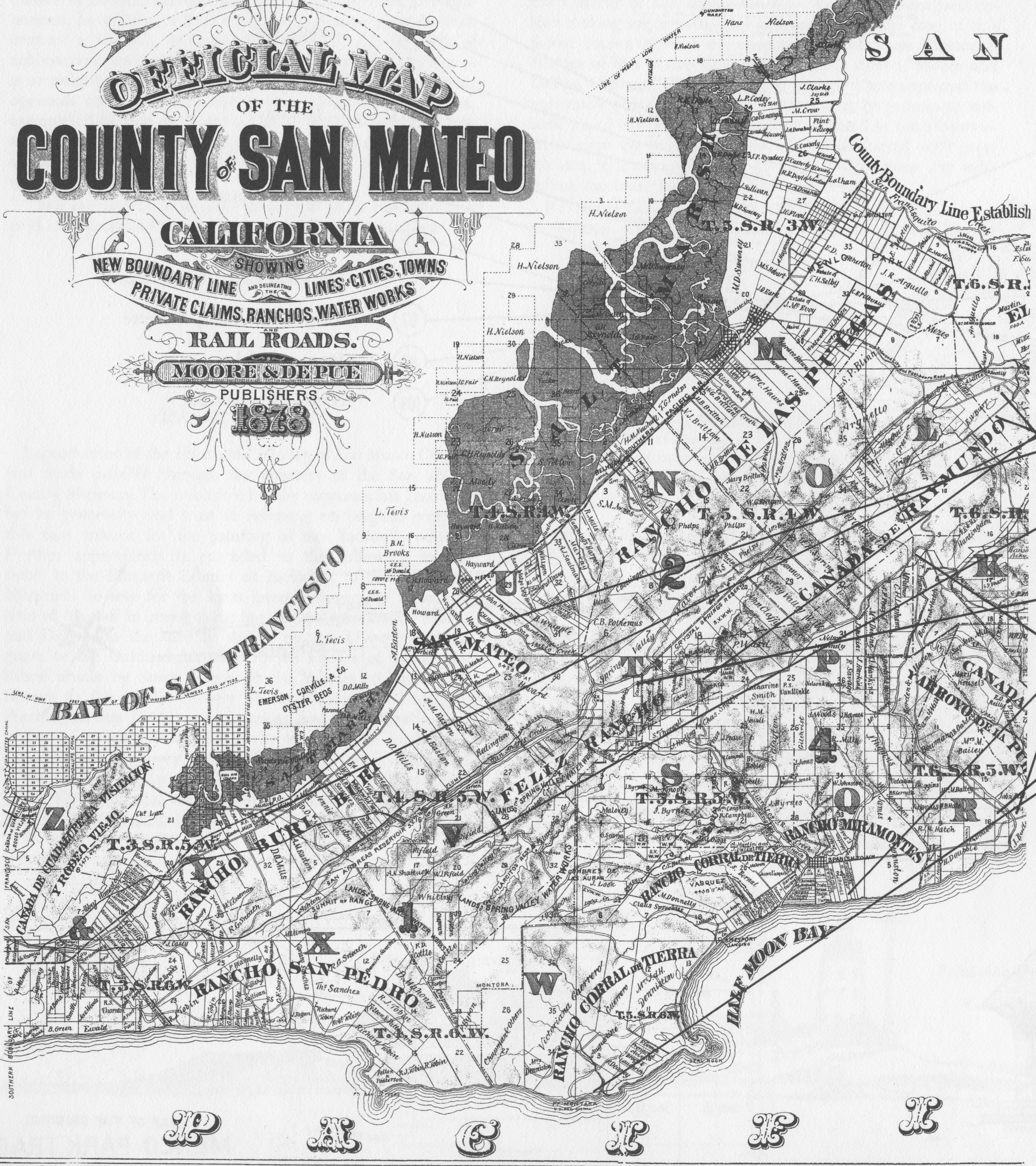
Map of San Mateo County, 1878

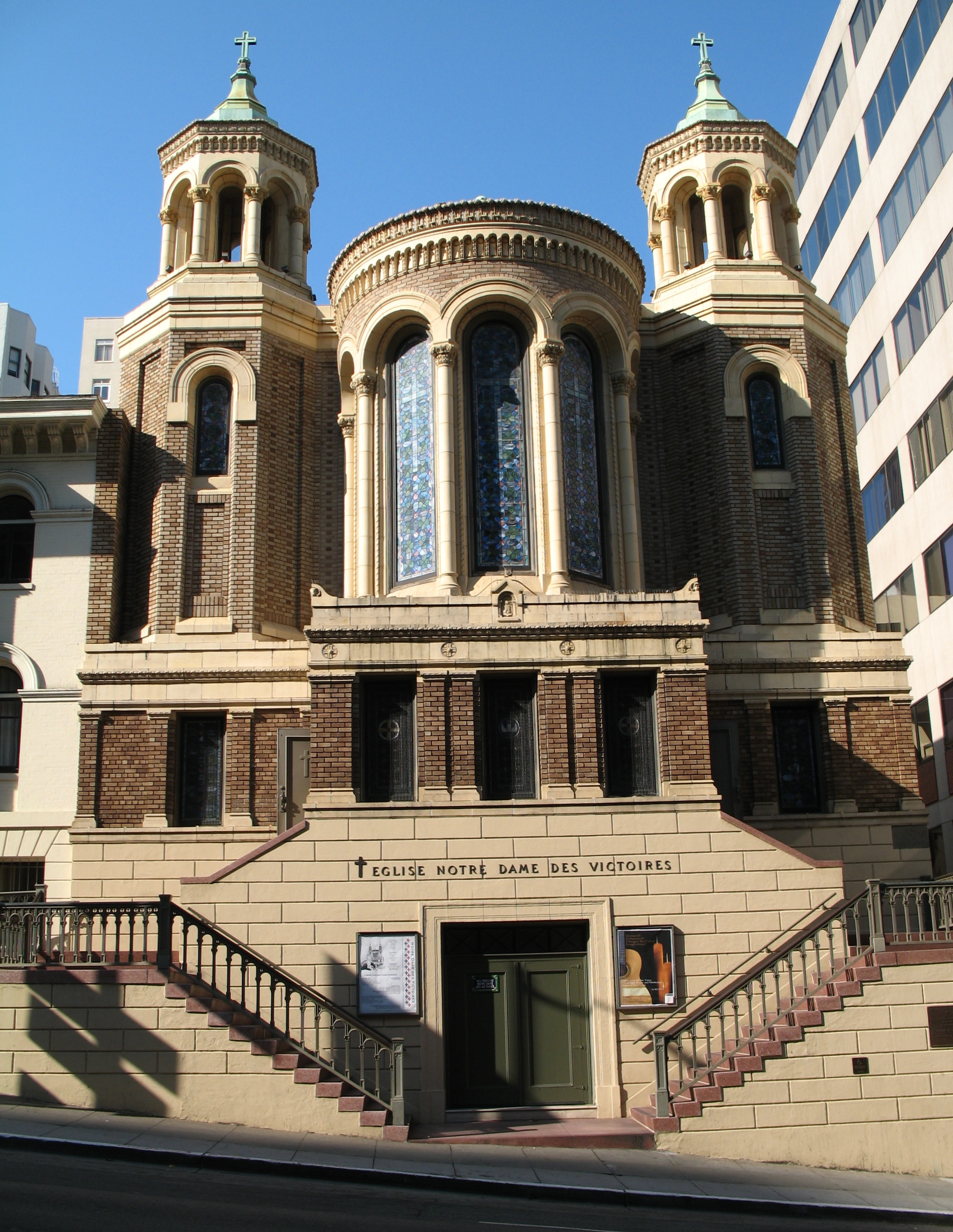
Église Notre Dame Des Victoires

- San Mateo County is incorporated (1878 map pictured)
- Hutchings' Illustrated California Magazine is founded in San Francisco
- Early San Francisco developer William A. Richardson dies
- Daily Evening Bulletin editor James King of William is shot and killed at Montgomery Street in San Francisco
- Église Notre Dame Des Victoires (pictured) in San Francisco is completed
1857

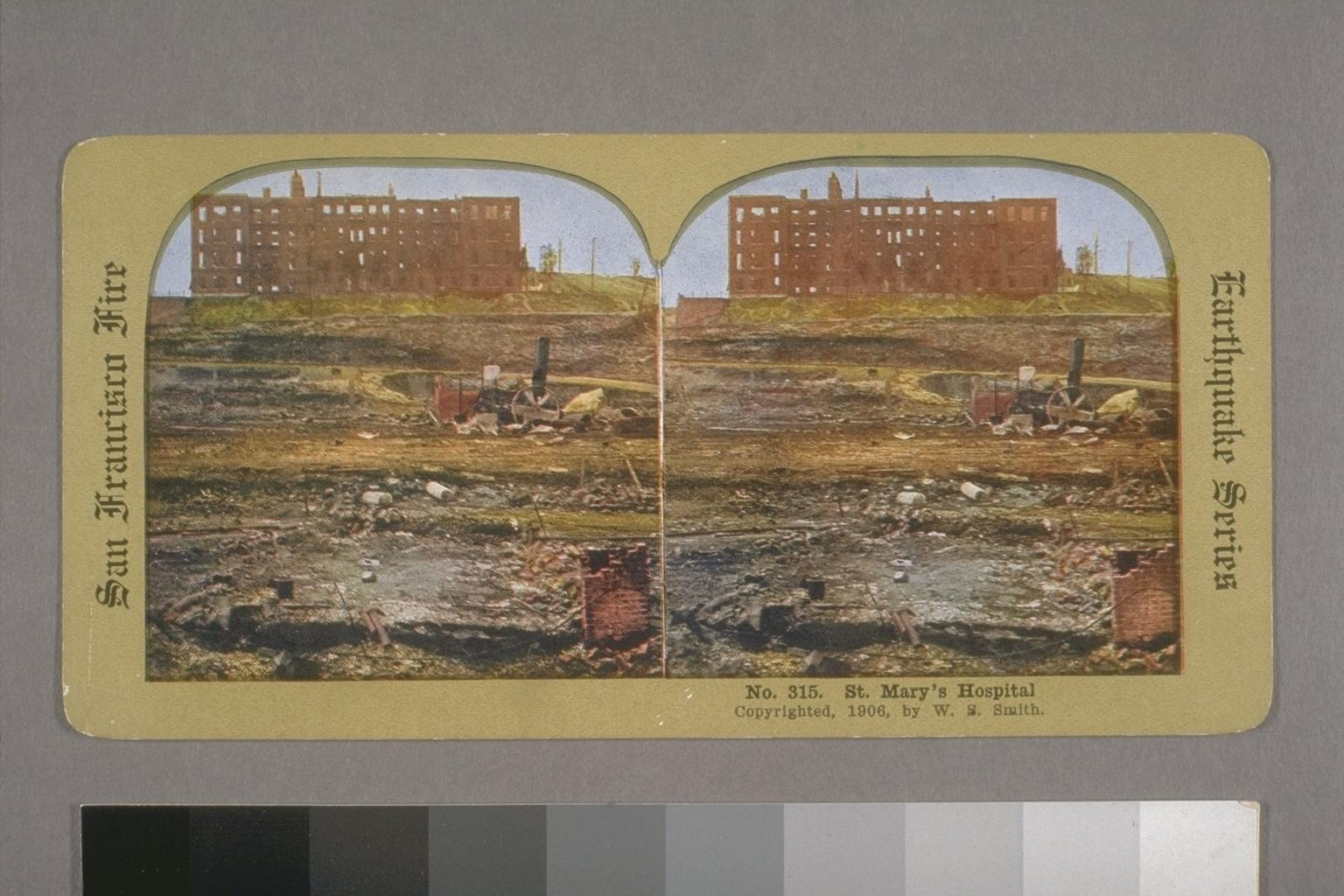
St. Mary's hospital after the 1906 earthquake

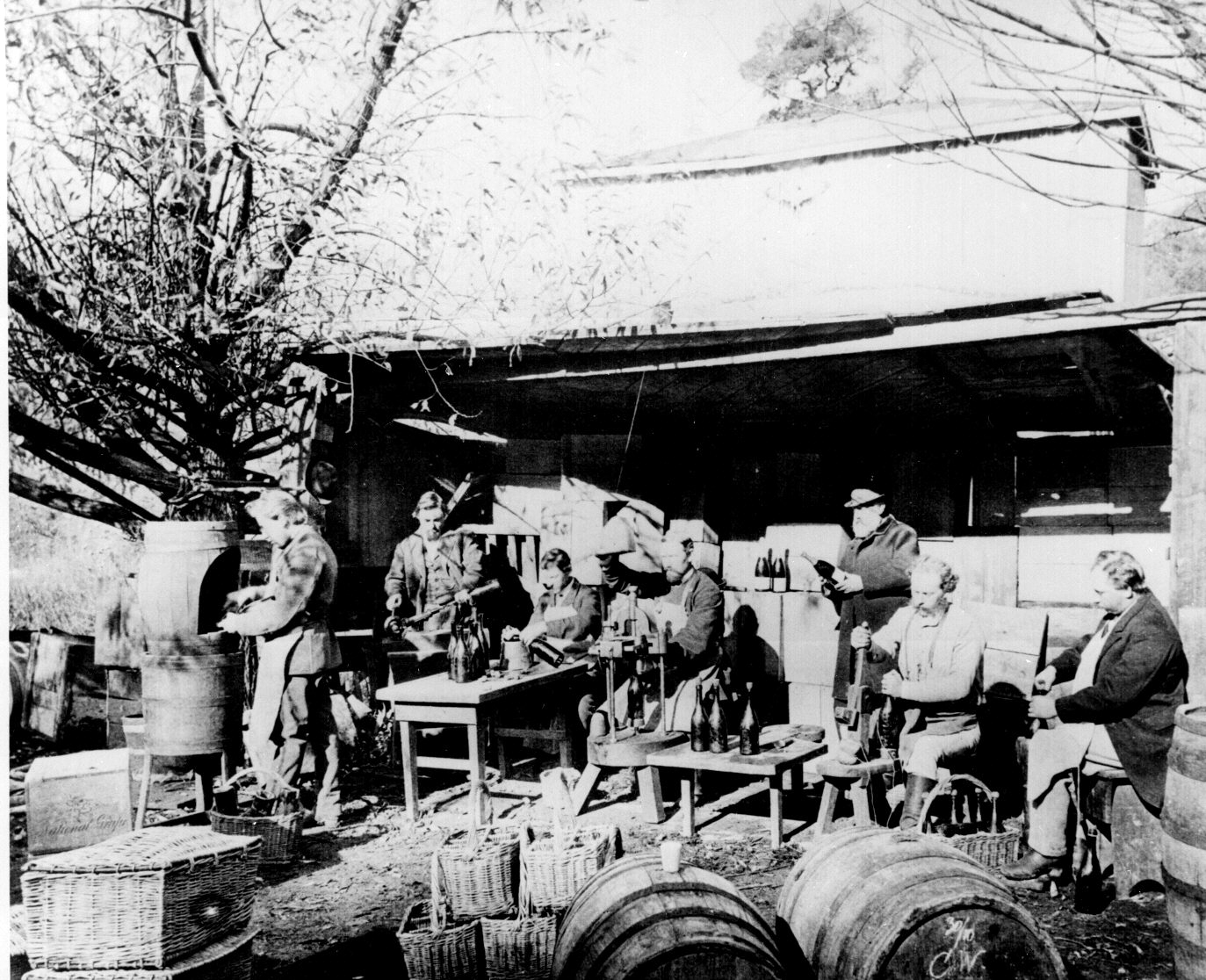
"Champagne Corking", by Eadweard Muybridge

- The Sisters of Mercy open St. Mary's Hospital on Stockton Street in San Francisco, the first Catholic hospital west of the Rocky Mountains (hospital ruins in 1906 pictured)
- Minns Evening Normal School is founded in San Francisco by George W. Minns
- George Kenny starts construction of an octagonal house at Russian Hill in San Francisco
- Landscape painter Fortunato Arriola moves to San Francisco from Cosala, Sinaloa, Mexico
- Lafayette is incorporated in Contra Costa County
- Buena Vista Winery is founded by Agoston Haraszthy in the Sonoma Valley (early champagne production pictured)
1858

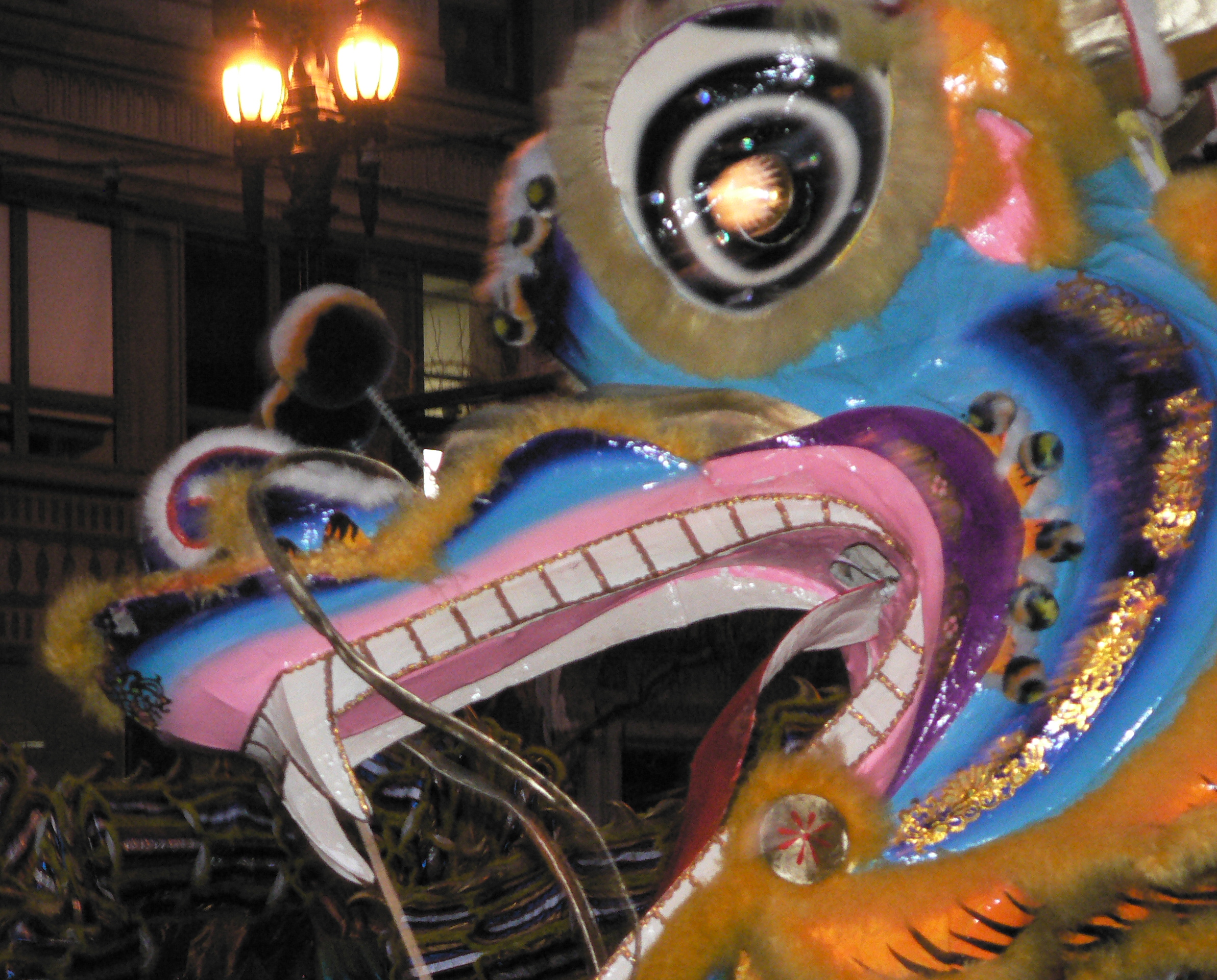
Dragon

- The first San Francisco Chinese New Year Festival and Parade is held in Chinatown, combining elements of the Chinese Lantern Festival with a typical American parade (contemporary parade dragon pictured)
- The William Hood House is built in Sonoma County, using bricks made on the property
- The Medical Department of the University of the Pacific, the first medical school on the West Coast, is founded in Santa Clara
- Bolinas School opens in Marin County
1859

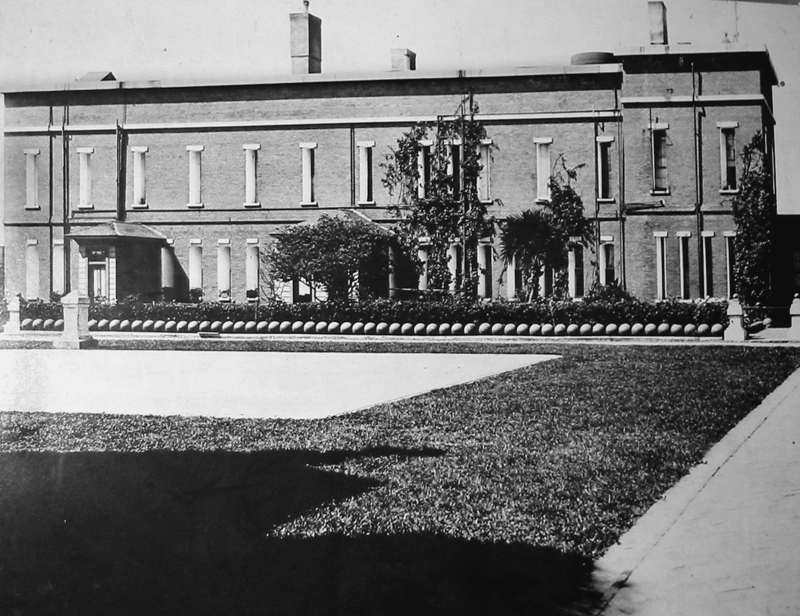
Alcatraz Citadel, 1908

- Alcatraz Citadel (pictured) is built on Alcatraz Island in the San Francisco Bay
- Laurentine Hamilton comes to San Jose to preach at the First Presbyterian Church of San Jose
- Joshua Norton declares himself "NORTON I, Emperor of the United States" in San Francisco
- Francis K. Shattuck is elected the fifth mayor of Oakland
1860

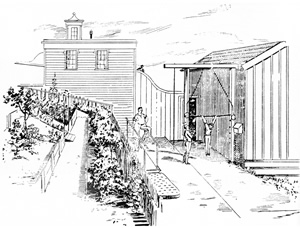
Nahl brothers in SF

- Congregation Beth Israel-Judea forms in San Francisco from the merger of the Conservative Congregation Beth Israel and the Reform Temple Judea
- The San Francisco Olympic Club is founded (founder Arthur Nahl pictured working out with his brother in 1855)
- The Woodford Hotel and Saloon in Contra Costa County becomes a Pony Express stop (historical plaque pictured)
- The James Lick Mansion in Santa Clara, the estate of James Lick, is completed
- The Black Diamond coal mine is started by Noah Norton
- San Francisco's population is 56,802, an increase by 63% from 1852's 34,776
1861

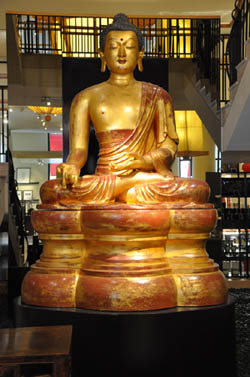
Iconic Gump's Buddha

- S & G Gump is established in San Francisco as a mirror and frame shop by Solomon Gump and his brother, Gustav (contemporary display pictured)
- Hutchings' Illustrated California Magazine in San Francisco ceases publishing
- Charles Krug founds the first winery in Napa Valley
- The Halleck, Peachy & Billings law firm in San Francisco is dissolved
1862

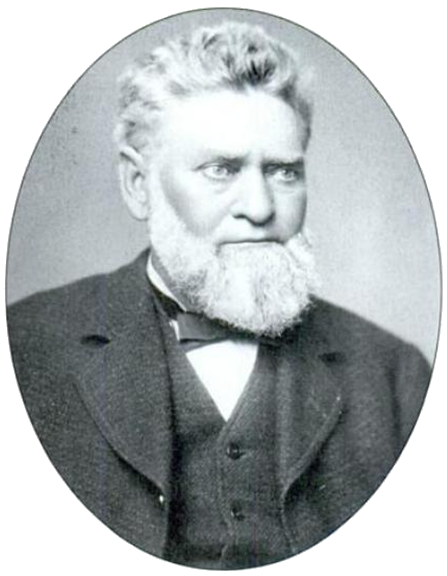
Jacob Schram

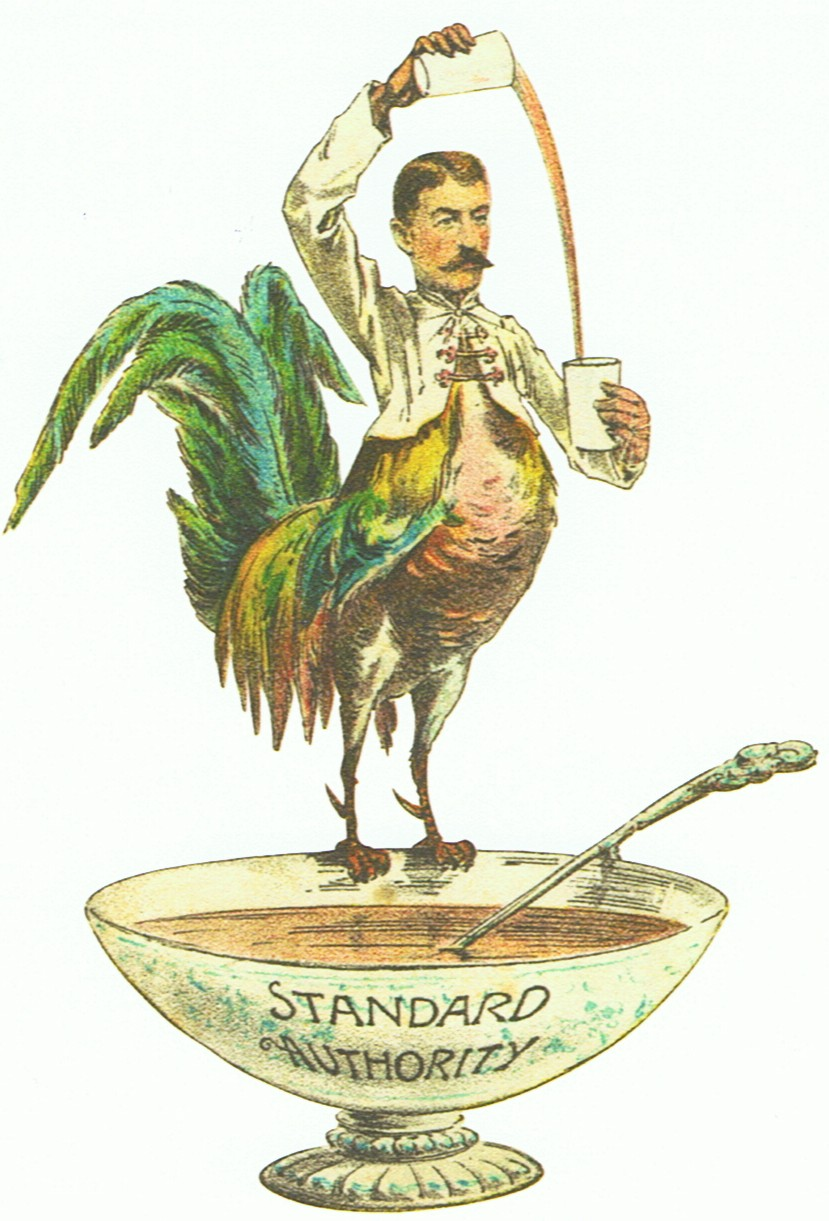
William "Cocktail" Boothby

• Schramsberg Vineyards is established in Napa Valley by Jacob Schram (pictured, left)
• The state capitol is moved from Sacramento to San Francisco, due to Flooding of the Central Valley
• Minns Evening Normal School in San Francisco is taken over by the state and moved to San Jose as the California State Normal School
• William Boothby (pictured, right) is born in San Francisco

1863

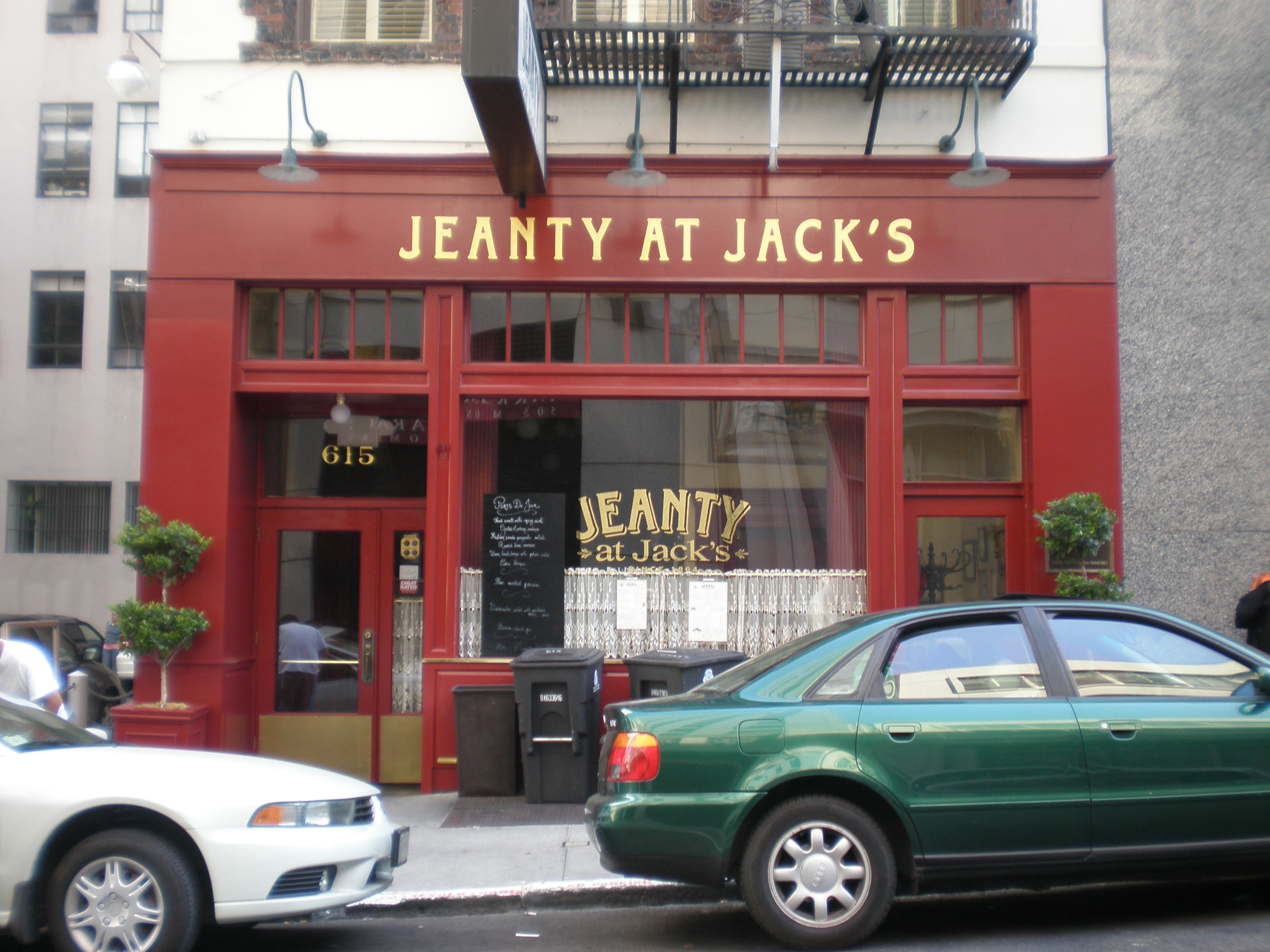
Jeanty at Jack's

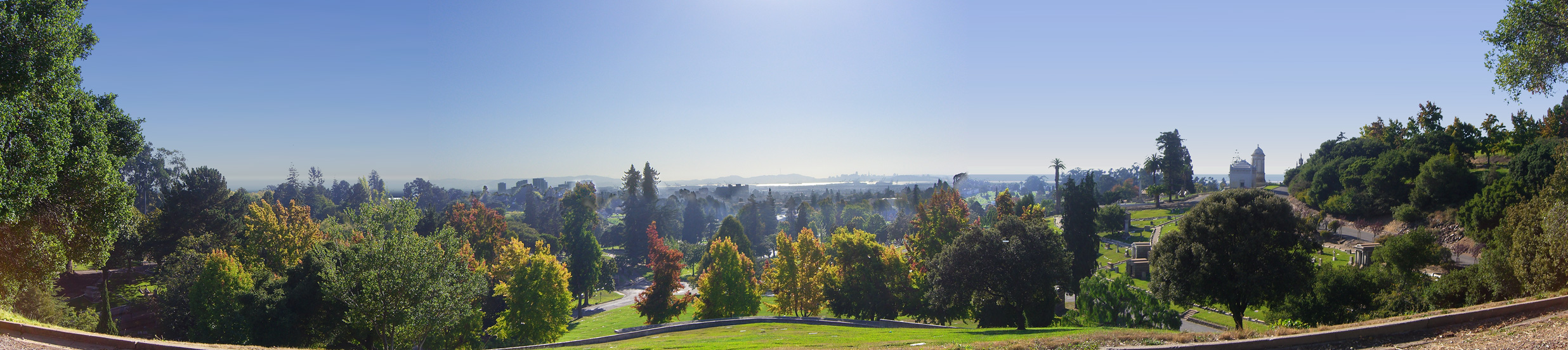
Mountain View Cemetery

- The Democratic Press is founded in San Francisco
- The California Educational Society is established in San Francisco
- Jack's Restaurant (pictured) opens in San Francisco
- The Napa Valley Register is established
- Mountain View Cemetery (pictured), designed by Frederick Law Olmsted, is established in Oakland
- African American resident Charlotte L. Brown files a lawsuit after being forcibly removed from a segregated horse-drawn streetcar in San Francisco
1864

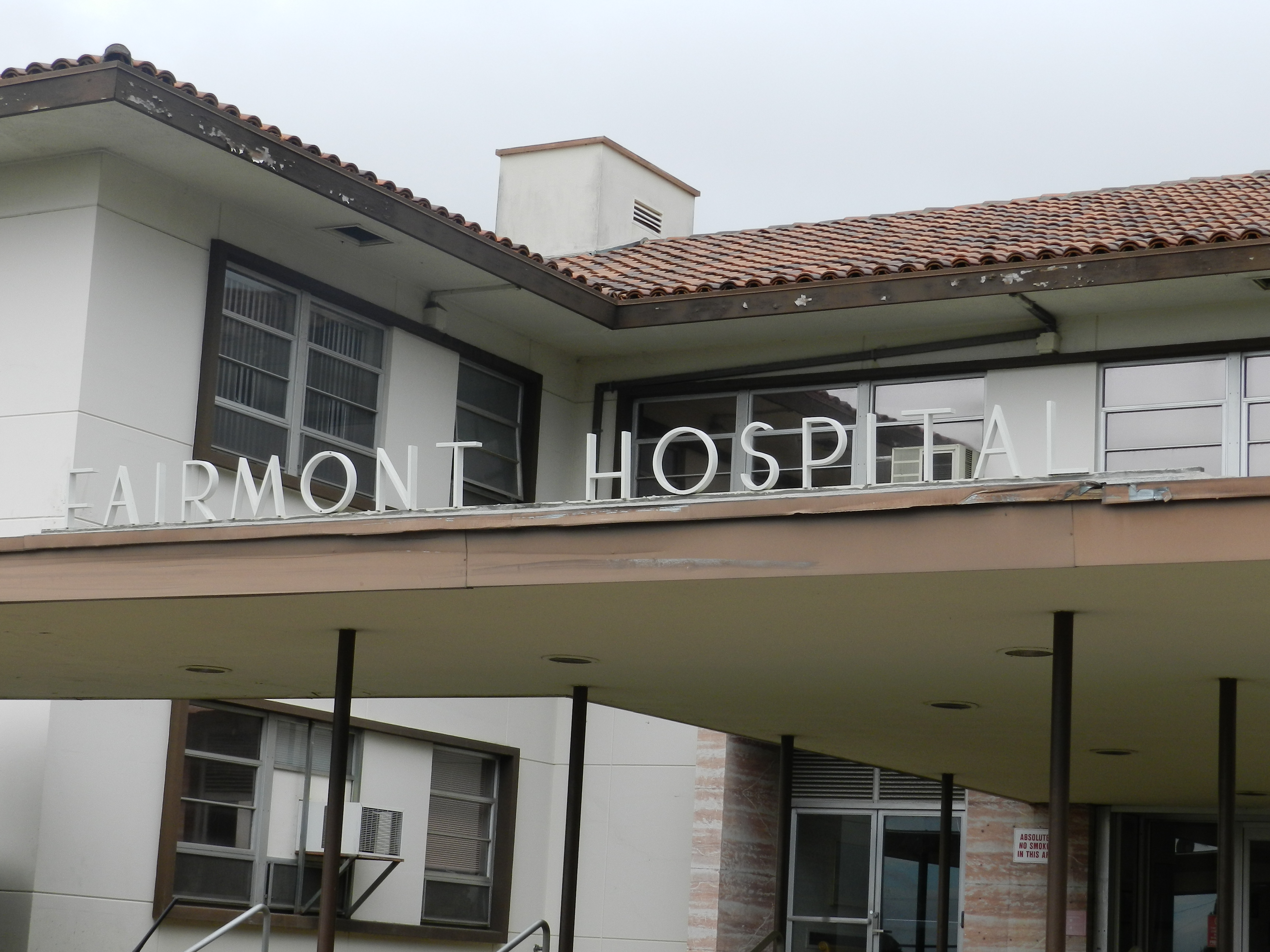
Fairmont Hospital entrance

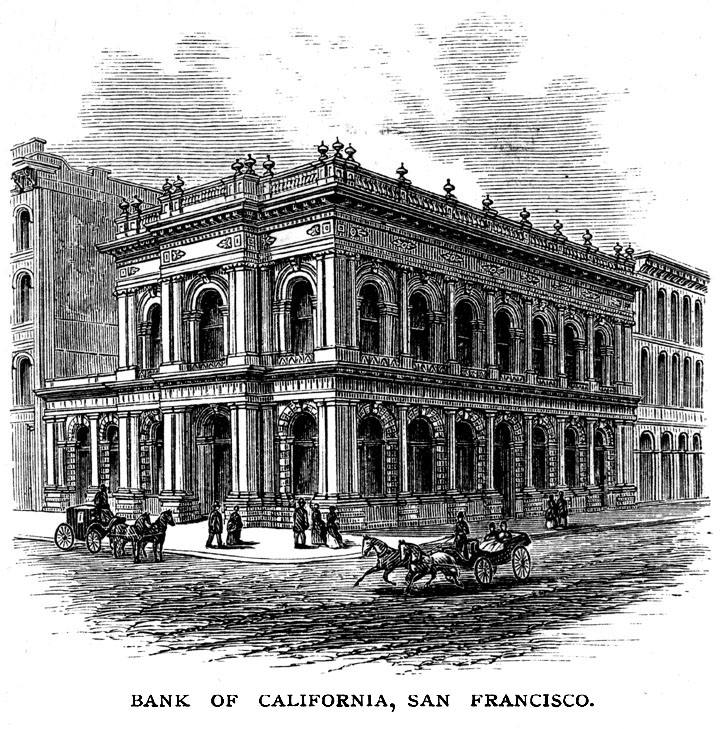
Bank of California

- The Alameda County Infirmary is established (Fairmont Hospital pictured)
- literary newspaper The Californian begins publishing in San Francisco, with Bret Harte as editor, and Mark Twain as a writer
- The Bank of California (pictured) is founded in San Francisco by William Chapman Ralston
- The Napa Valley Railroad Company is founded by Samuel Brannan to shuttle tourists between ferry boats docked in Vallejo to the resort town of Calistoga
- The San Francisco and San Jose Railroad completes its 49.5-mile (80 km) route from San Francisco to San Jose along the San Francisco Peninsula, becoming the first railroad to link the two cities
1865

SF Chronicle logo

- The Daily Dramatic Chronicle (later logo pictured) is founded in San Francisco by teenage brothers Charles de Young and Michael H. de Young
- The California Pacific Rail Road Company is incorporated in San Francisco
- The California State Mineral Collection is begun in San Francisco, driven by the mineral finds of the California Gold Rush
- Jefferson Thompson in West Marin begins making a fresh Brie "breakfast cheese" that is transported by horse-drawn carriage to Petaluma, then shipped by steamboat down the Petaluma River to San Francisco where it is sold to waterfront dockworkers
1866

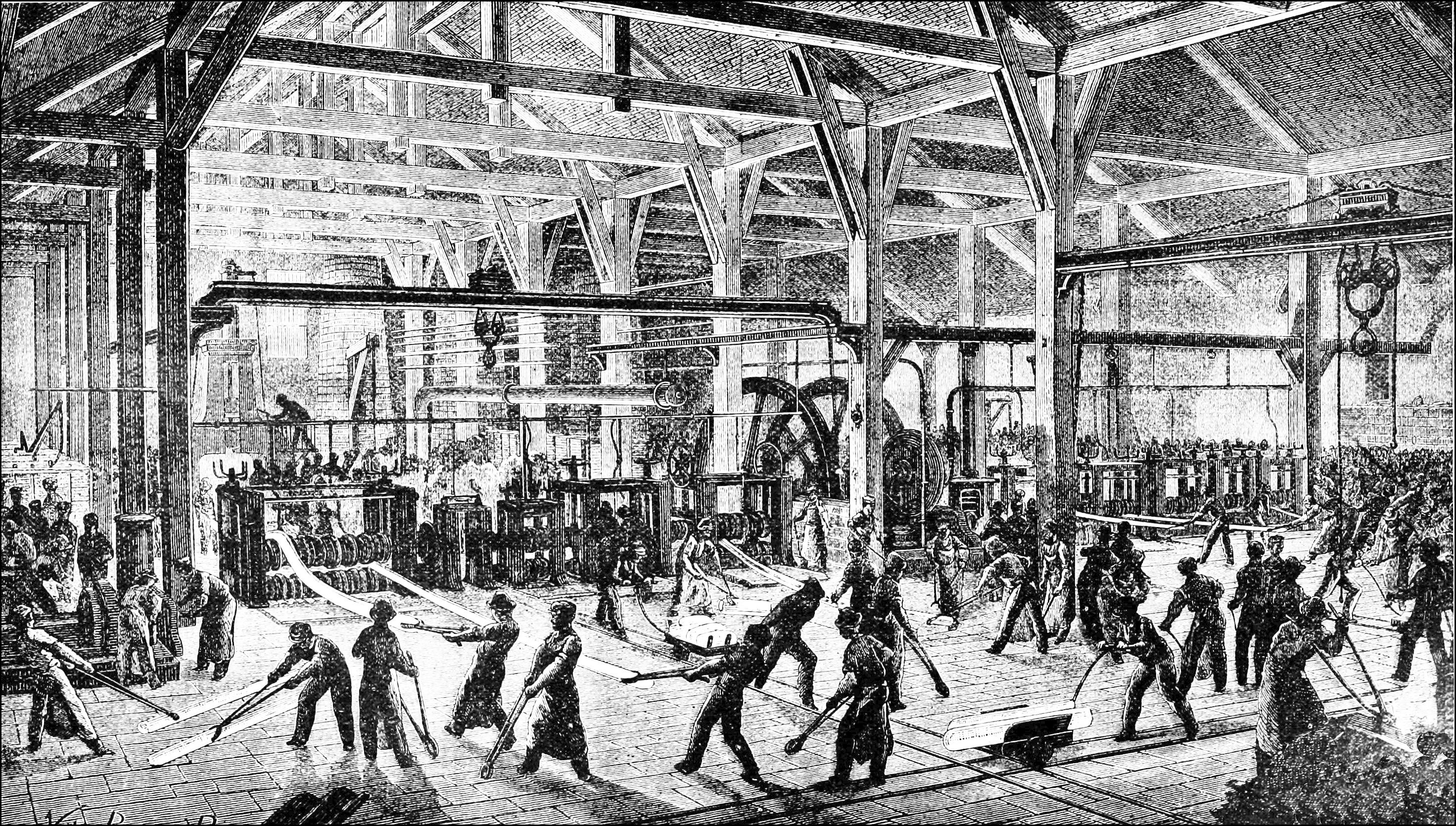
Interior of a rolling mill, 1855

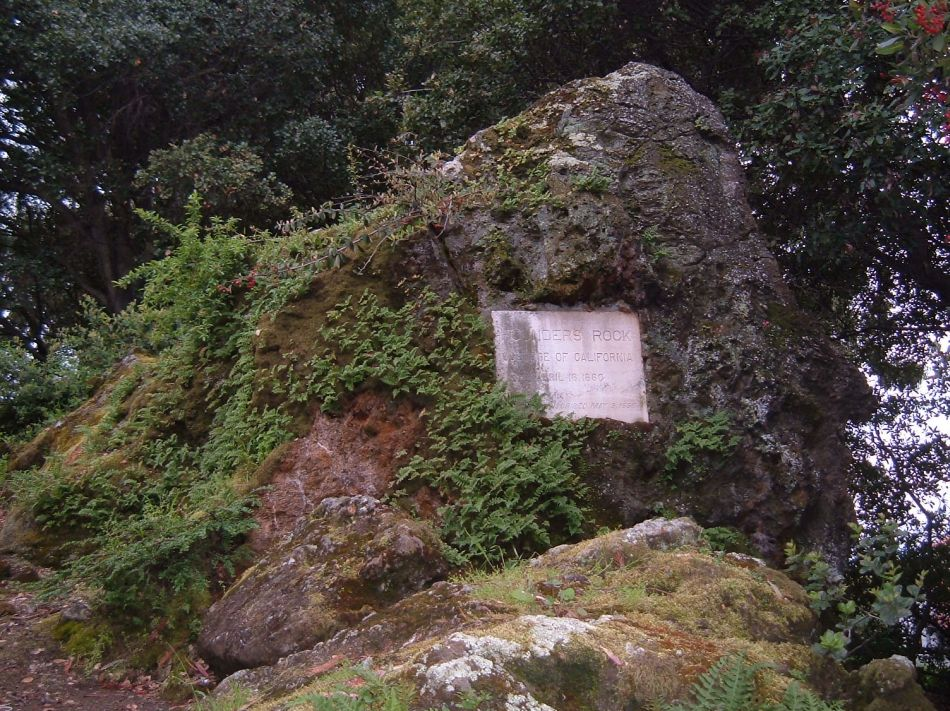
Founder's Rock

- Pacific Rolling Mill Company, the West's first iron and steel producing foundry (rolling mill of the period pictured), is established in San Francisco
- Frederick Billings of the College of California, while walking with fellow collegians through land purchased in 1860 for the new location of the college, stops at a spot (pictured) in the Contra Costa Range astride Strawberry Creek, with a view of the Bay Area and the Pacific Ocean through the Golden Gate. While watching two ships standing out to sea, he remembers a line by Anglican Bishop George Berkeley, "westward the course of empire takes its way", and suggests Berkeley's name for the college and the town to grow around it.
1867

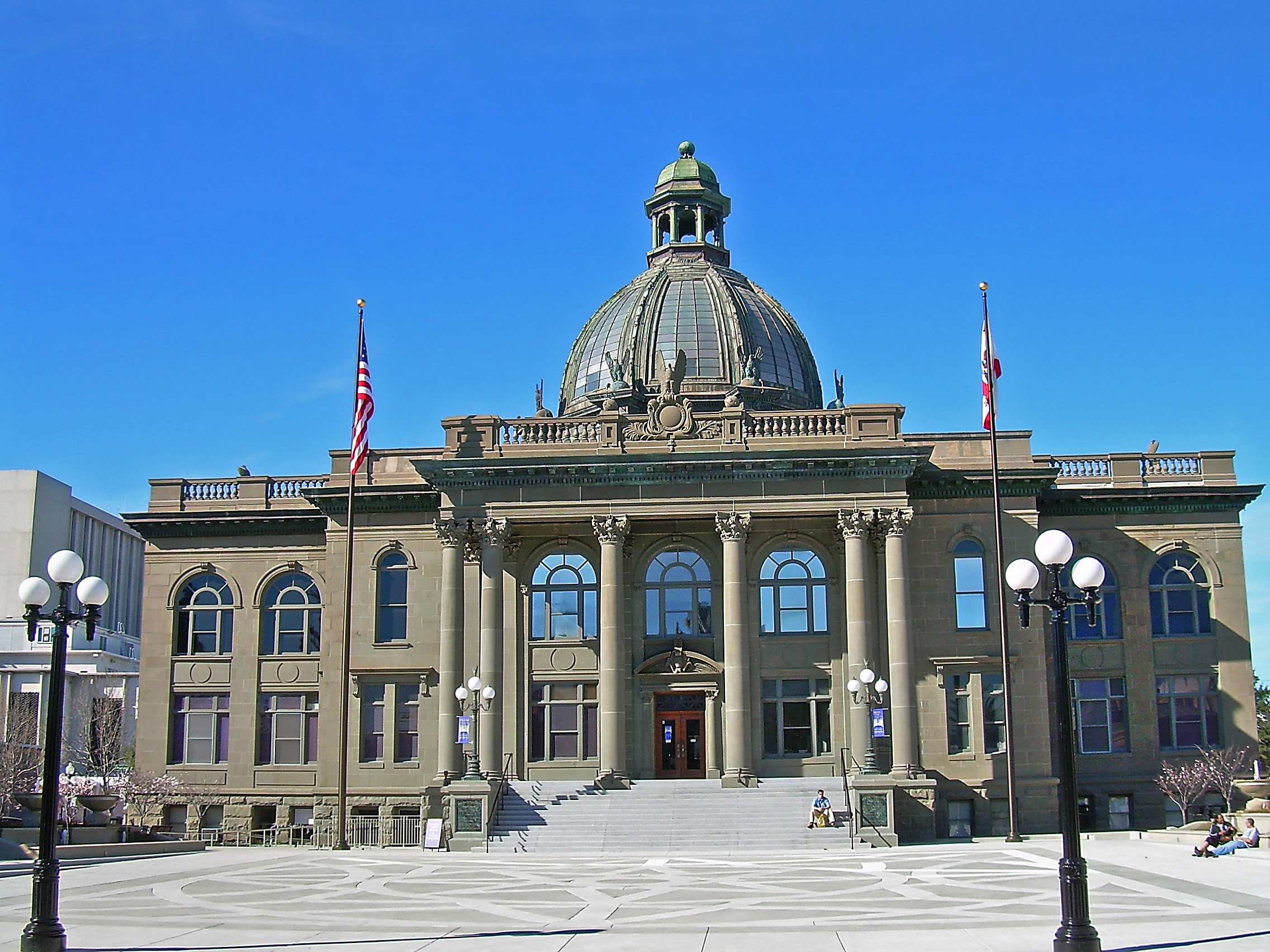
San Mateo County History Museum, formerly the San Mateo County Courthouse

- Ezra Decoto, an Alameda County landowner, sells land to the railroads, and an eponymous small settlement begins at the location
- Redwood City in San Mateo County is incorporated (historic building pictured)
- Hill Park is established in San Francisco
1868

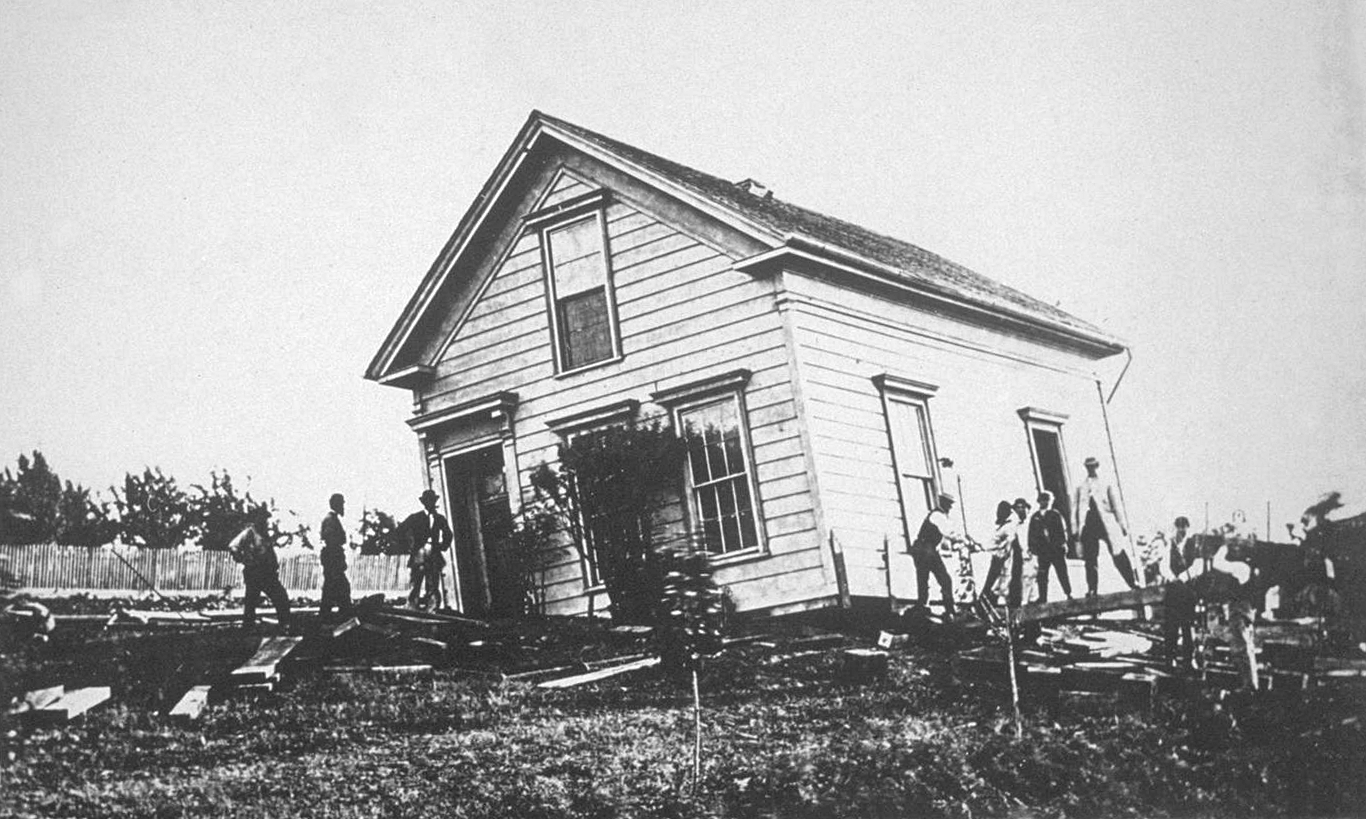
Damage from the Great San Francisco earthquake, in Haywards area

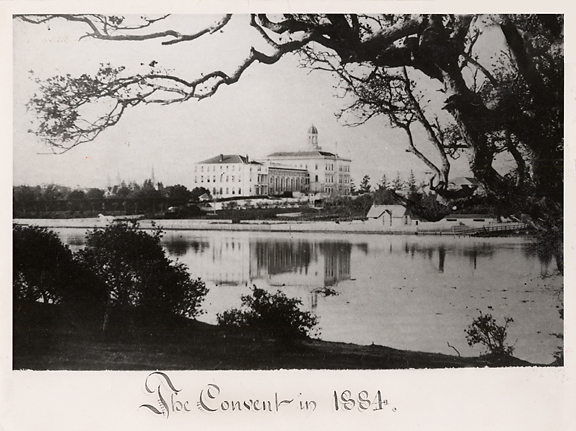
1884 Convent of Our Lady of the Sacred Heart

• An earthquake estimated at 6.3–6.7 on the moment magnitude scale hits the Bay Area, with an epicenter in the East Bay. It causes significant damage throughout the region, and comes to be known as the "Great San Francisco earthquake". (damage in the Haywards area pictured, right)
• The Convent of Our Lady of the Sacred Heart (pictured, right) in Oakland is established by members of the Sisters of the Holy Names from Canada
• The University of California (logo pictured, left) is established in Berkeley, along with the first campus in the system, the University of California, Berkeley
• Santa Rosa in Sonoma County is incorporated
• Vallejo in Solano County is incorporated
• Bret Harte begins publishing the Overland Monthly in San Francisco
• The Guittard Chocolate Company is founded in San Francisco

1869

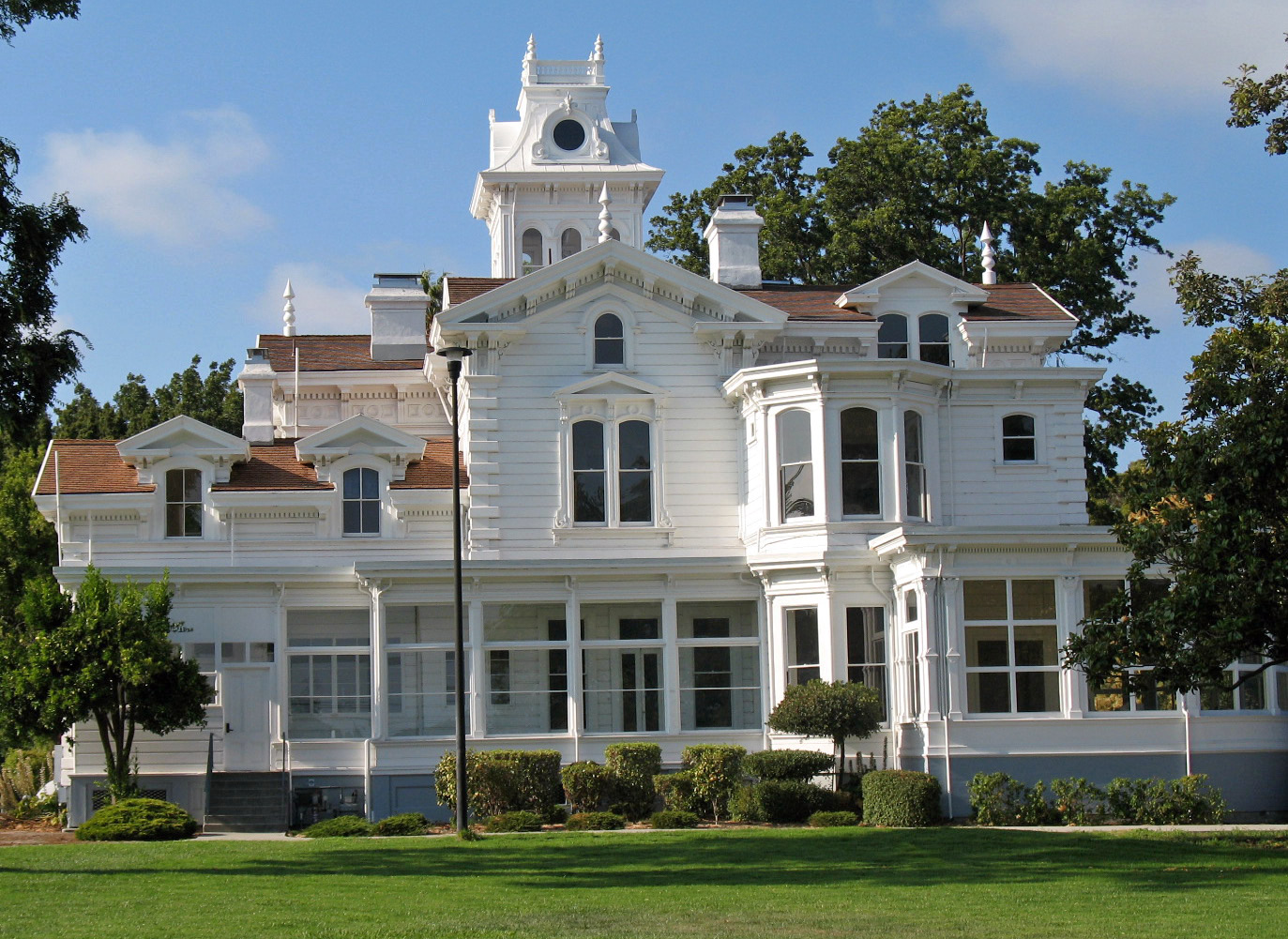
Meek Mansion

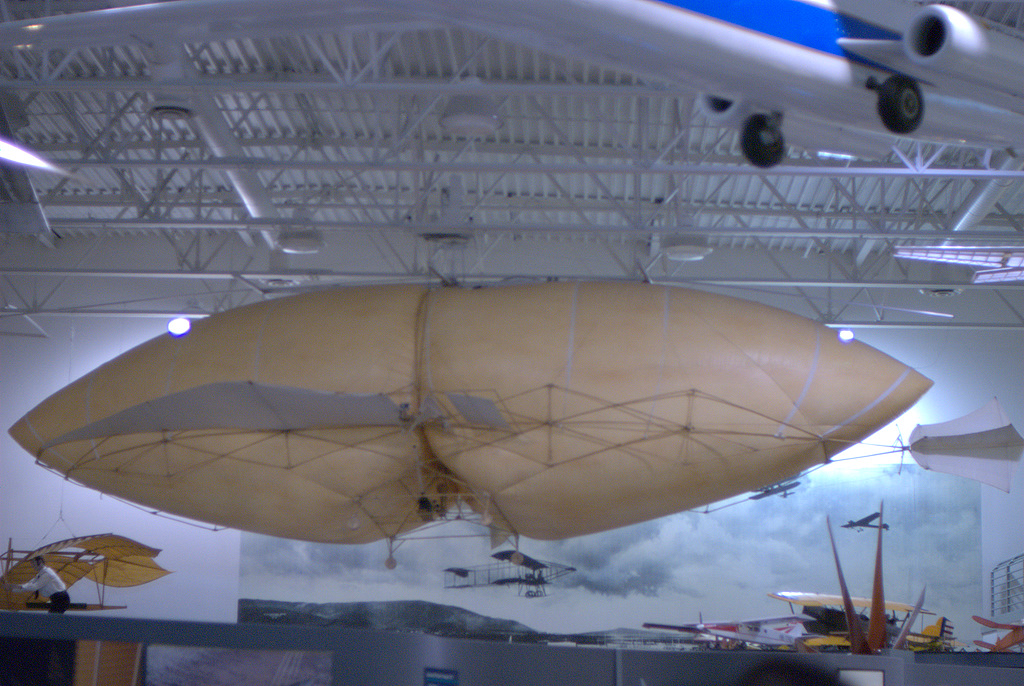
Hermes Avitor Jr. replica

- Meek Mansion (pictured) in the East Bay is completed
- The first Japanese immigrants arrive in San Francisco
- The California Theatre in San Francisco opens
- Frederick Marriott's unmanned, lighter-than-air craft the Hermes Avitor Jr. (replica pictured) takes to the air at the Shellmound Park racetrack in Emeryville, flying at about 5 miles per hour
- Laurentine Hamilton is charged with heresy and resigns from his ordination in the Presbyterian church, with most of his parishioners joining him in forming the First Independent Presbyterian Church in Oakland
1870

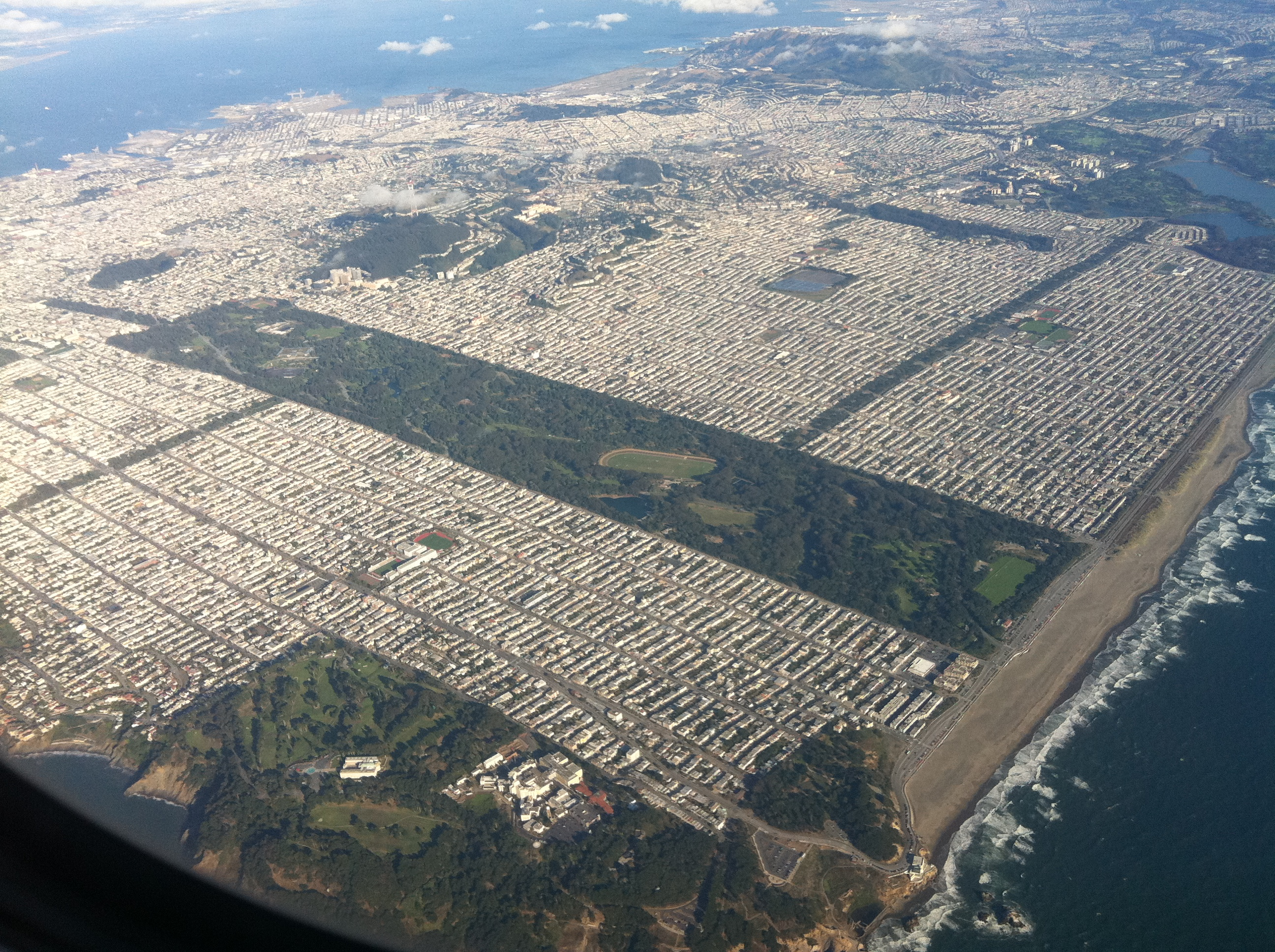
Aerial photo of San Francisco showing Golden Gate Park

- Golden Gate Park in San Francisco (contemporary aerial photo shown) is surveyed and mapped
- The First National Gold Bank in San Francisco begins producing National Bank Notes redeemable in gold
- San Francisco's population is 149,473, an increase by 163% from 1860's 56,802
1871

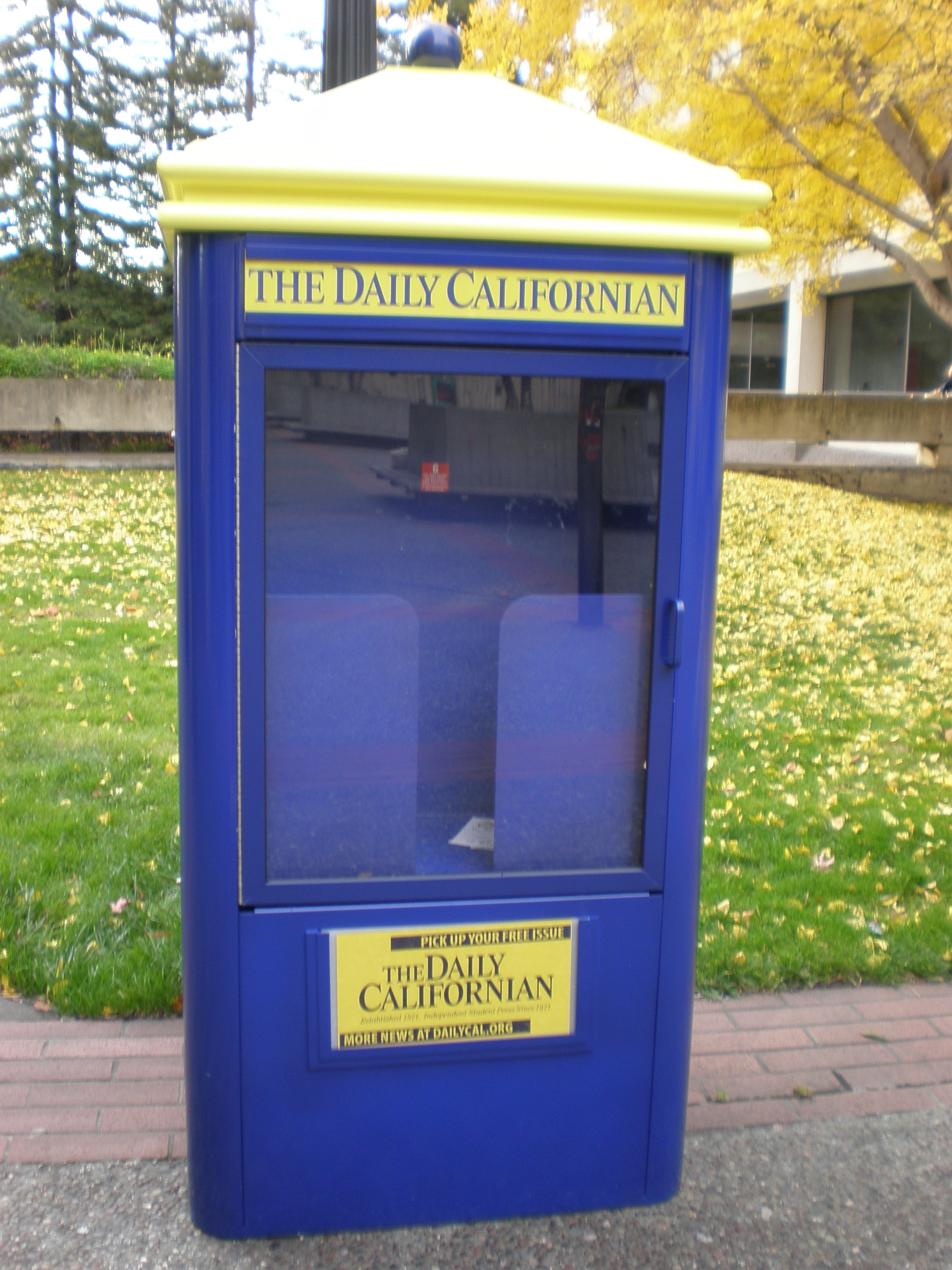
Daily Californian kiosk

- The California Historical Society is founded in San Francisco
- The Daily Californian student-run newspaper (contemporary kiosk pictured) is founded at the University of California, Berkeley
- The San Francisco Art Association is founded by a group of landscape painters led by Virgil Williams
1872

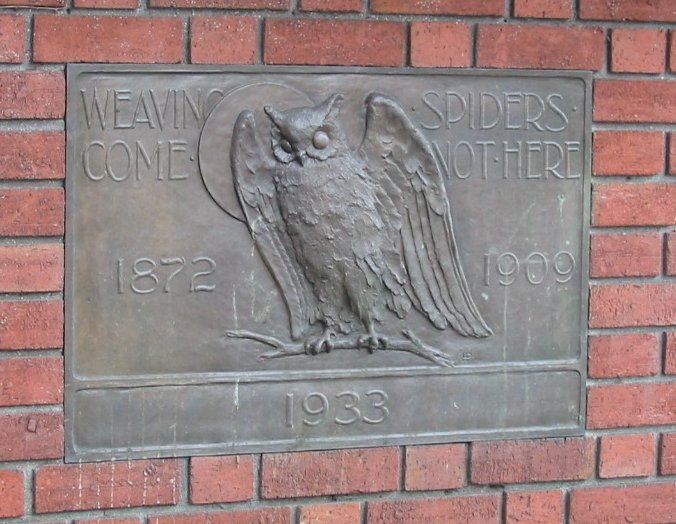
Owl plaque at Bohemian Club

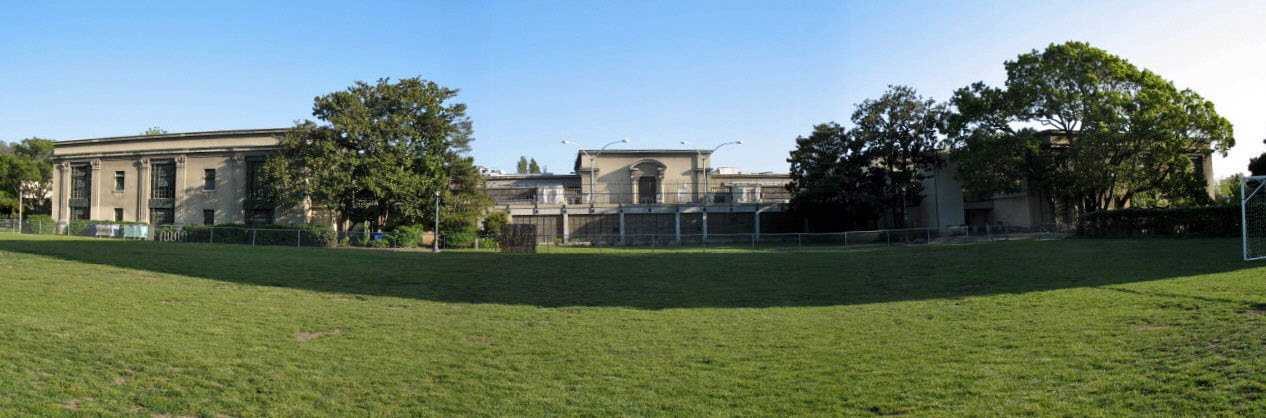
Hearst Gym, UC Berkeley

- The Bohemian Club (plaque pictured) is founded in San Francisco
- Alum Rock Park, the first municipal park in California, is established at a valley in the Diablo Range foothills on the east side of San Jose
- Napa is incorporated in Marin County
- Julia Morgan is born in San Francisco (Hearst Gymnasium for Women at the University of California, Berkeley pictured)
1873

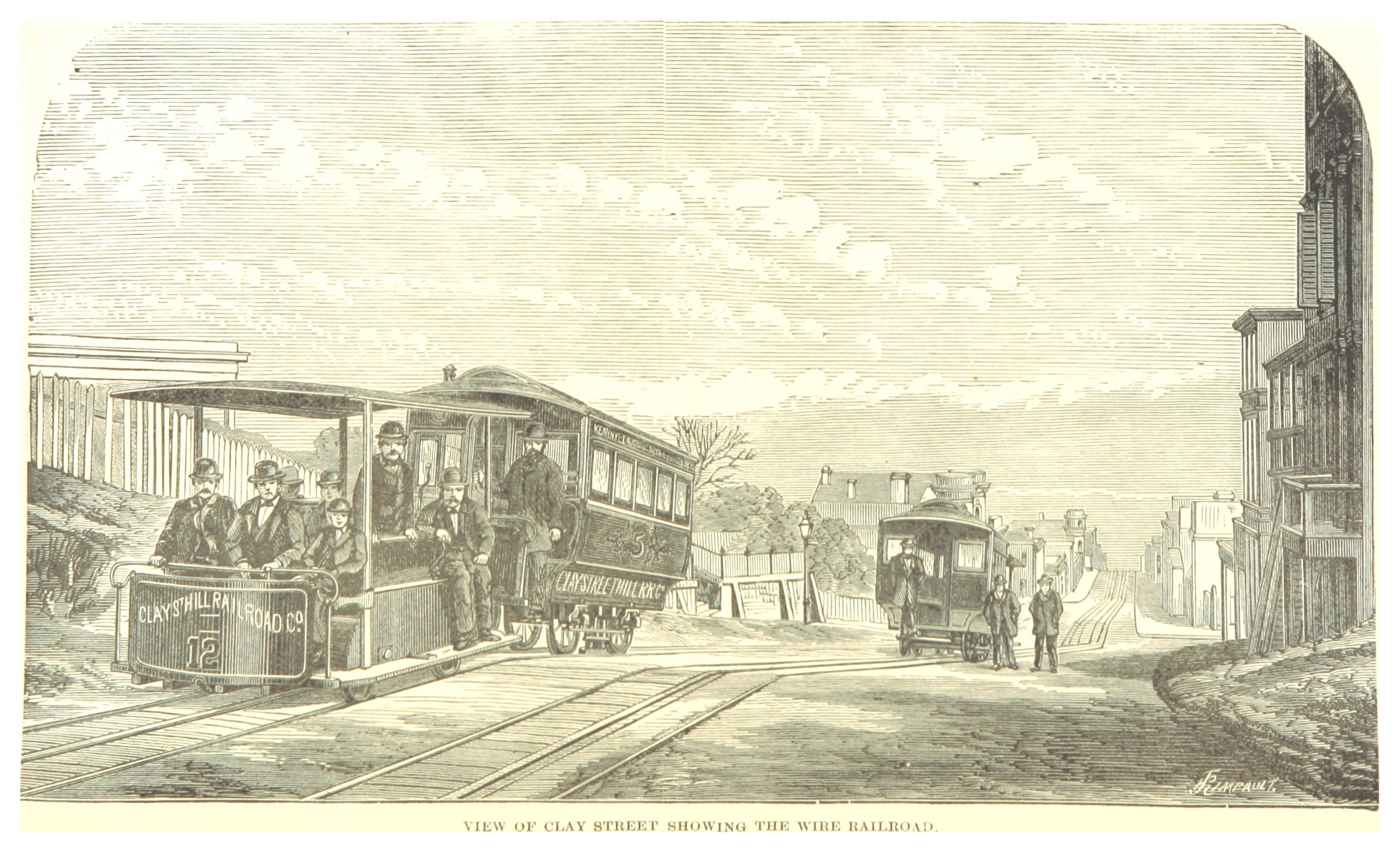
Early cable cars

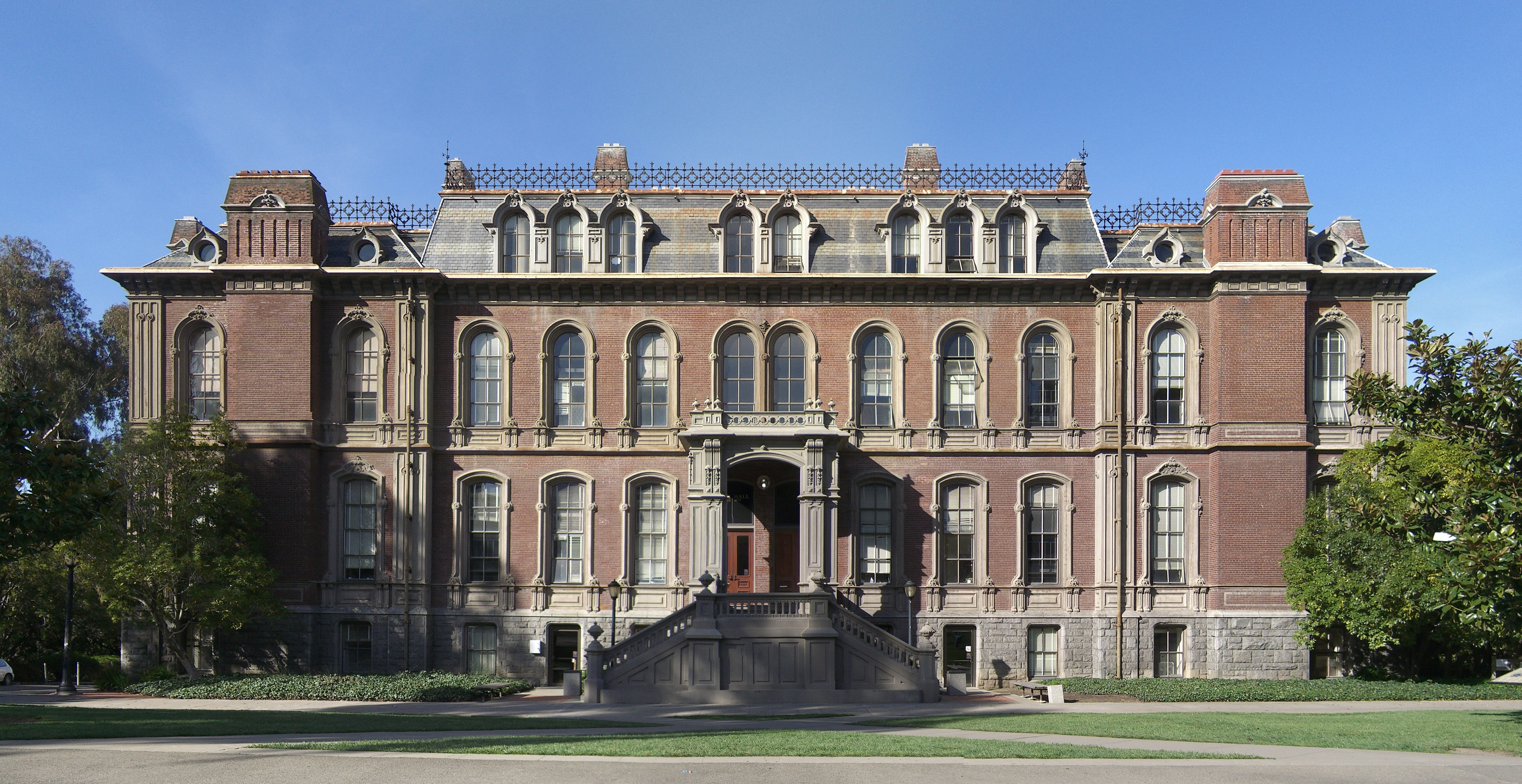
South Hall, UC Berkeley

• The Clay Street Hill Railroad, the first in the San Francisco cable car system (pictured, left), begins operations
• South Hall (pictured, right) is built in Berkeley, thus becoming the new location of the University of California, Berkeley, formerly located in Oakland

1874

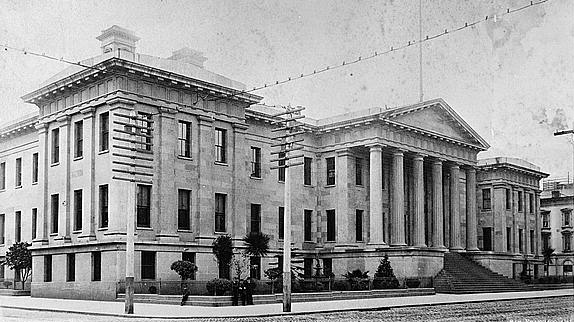
Old San Francisco Mint

East Brother Island Lighthouse

- The second San Francisco Mint building (pictured) is completed
- Markham Vineyards is founded in the Napa Valley
- East Brother Island Light (pictured) is built on East Brother Island near the tip of Point San Pablo in Richmond
- The Oakland Tribune begins publishing
1875

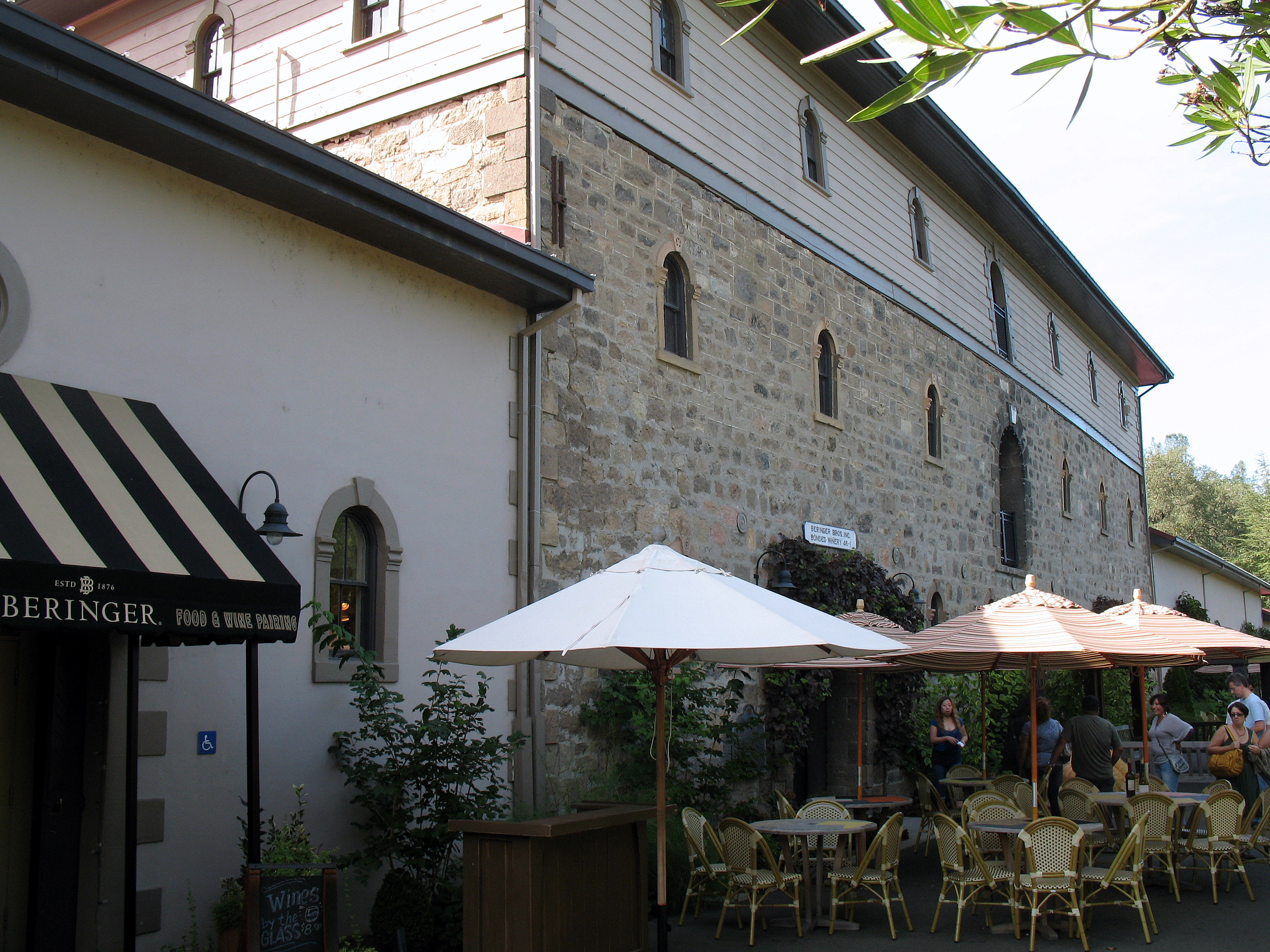
Beringer Brothers historic building

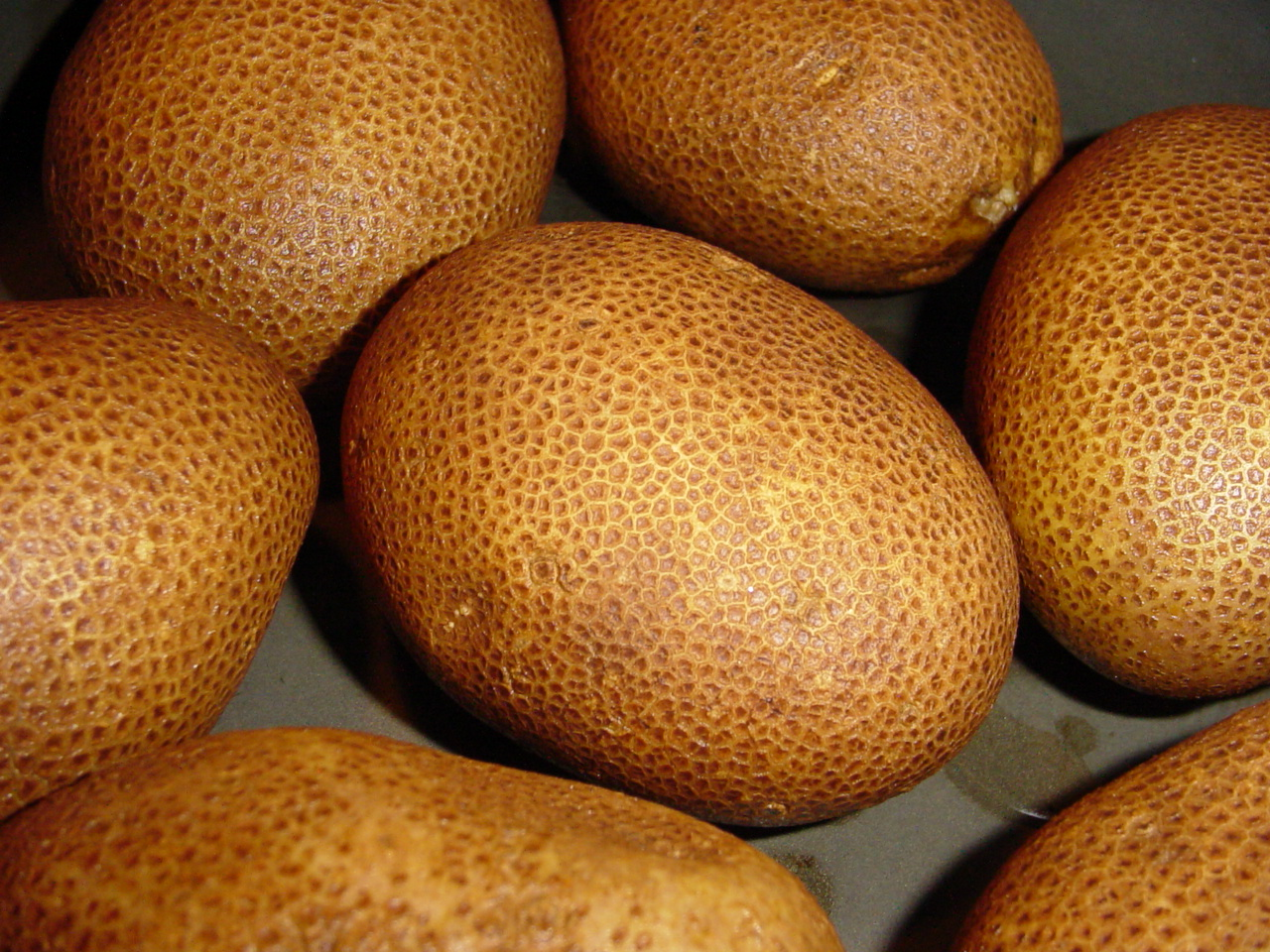
Russet Burbank potatoes

- Beringer Vineyards (pictured) in the Napa Valley is established
- Napa State Hospital in Napa is established
- Point Montara Light in Montara begins operating using a kerosene lantern
- Luther Burbank moves to Santa Rosa from Massachusetts, with money from selling the rights to a potato cultivar (russet Burbank potatoes pictured)
1876

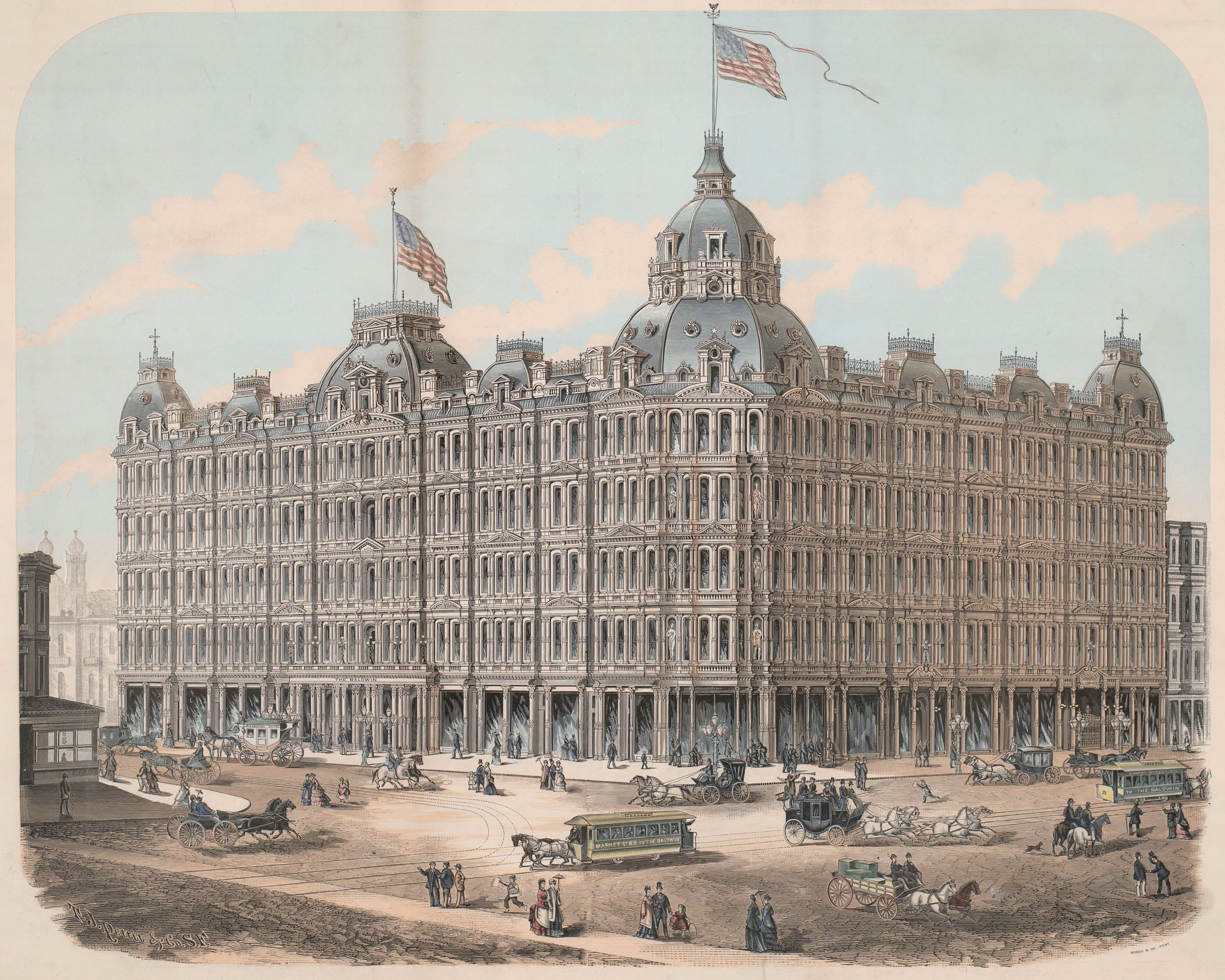
Baldwin Hotel and Theatre

- The Baldwin Hotel (pictured) is built in San Francisco as an addition to the Baldwin Theatre
- Hayward in Alameda County is incorporated
1877

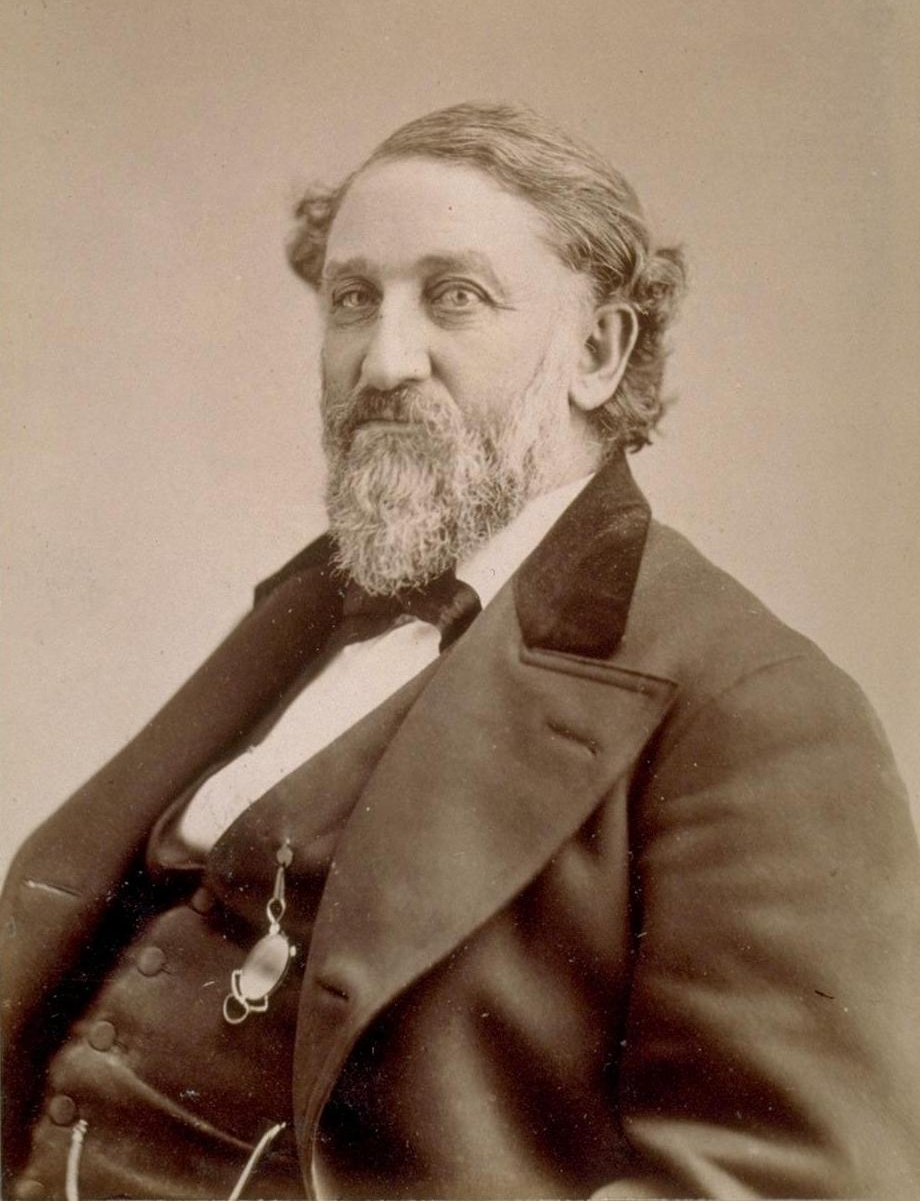
Frank M. Pixley, founder & editor of The Argonaut

- A two-day pogrom is waged against Chinese immigrants in San Francisco by the city's majority white population, resulting in four deaths and the destruction of more than $100,000 worth of property belonging to the city's Chinese immigrant population.
- The Argonaut literary journal is founded by Frank M. Pixley (pictured) in San Francisco
1878

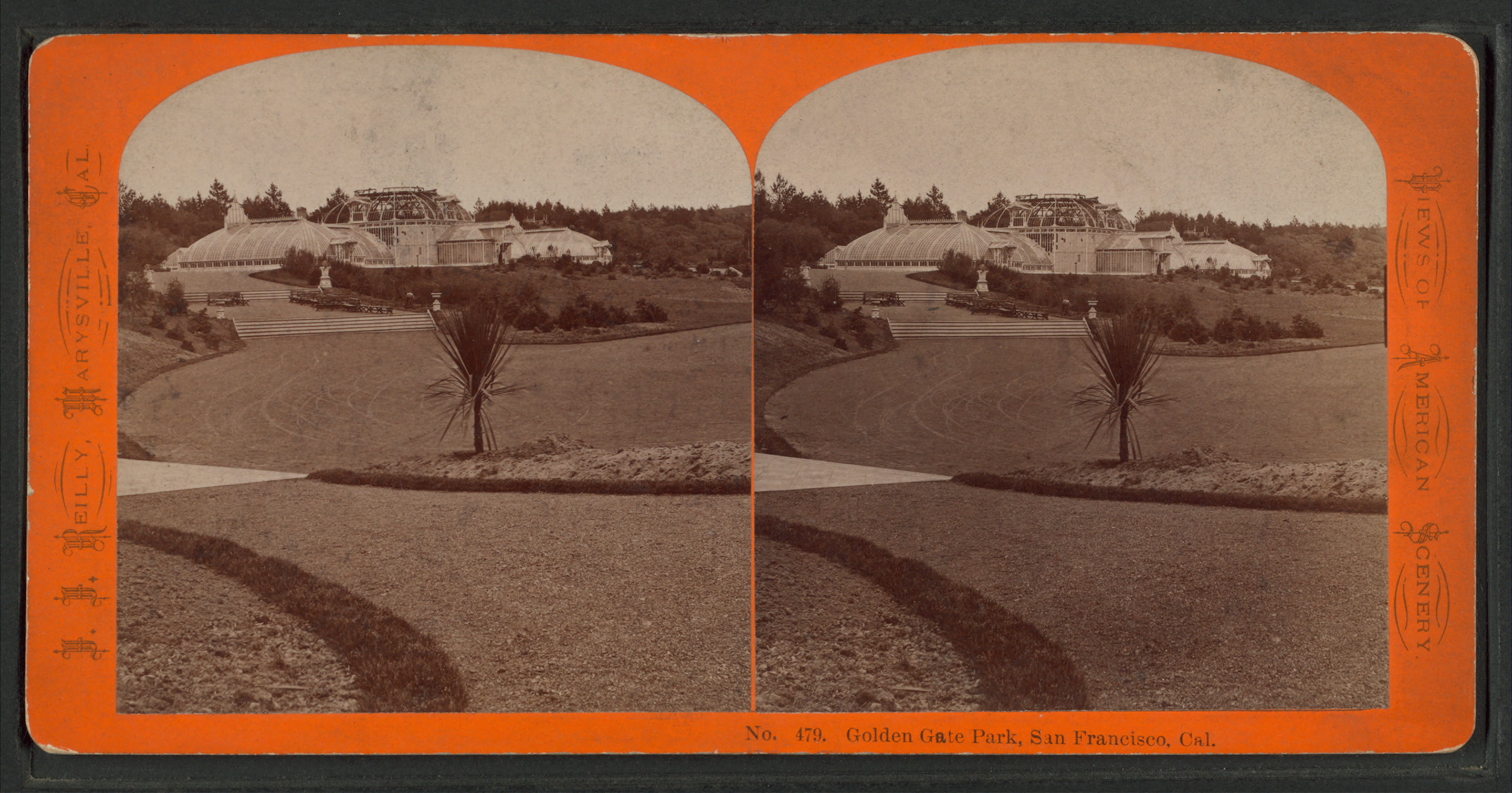
Construction at the Conservatory of Flowers

Mark Hopkins mansion

- The Conservatory of Flowers (pictured) in Golden Gate Park, San Francisco is completed
- Mark Hopkin's mansion (pictured) in San Francisco is completed
- The California Street Cable Railroad, a cable car company, is founded in San Francisco by Leland Stanford
- Austin Herbert Hills and R. W. Hills begin selling coffee and tea from a market stall in San Francisco
1879

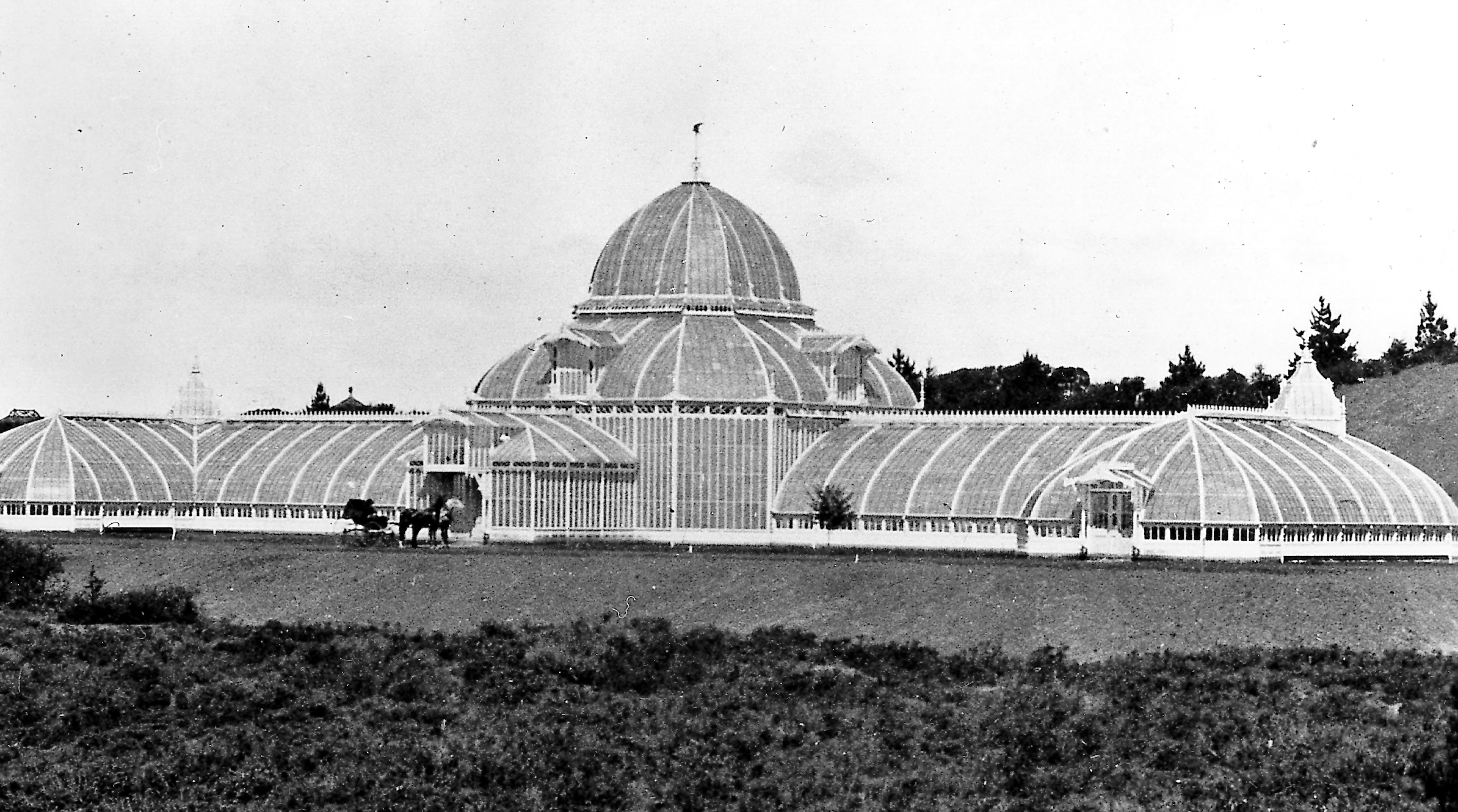
Conservatory of Flowers in 1879

- The Conservatory of Flowers (pictured) in Golden Gate Park, San Francisco, opens to the public
- Finnish fur trader Gustave Niebaum founds Inglenook Winery in the Napa Valley village of Rutherford
- Croll's Gardens and Hotel is built in Alameda
1880

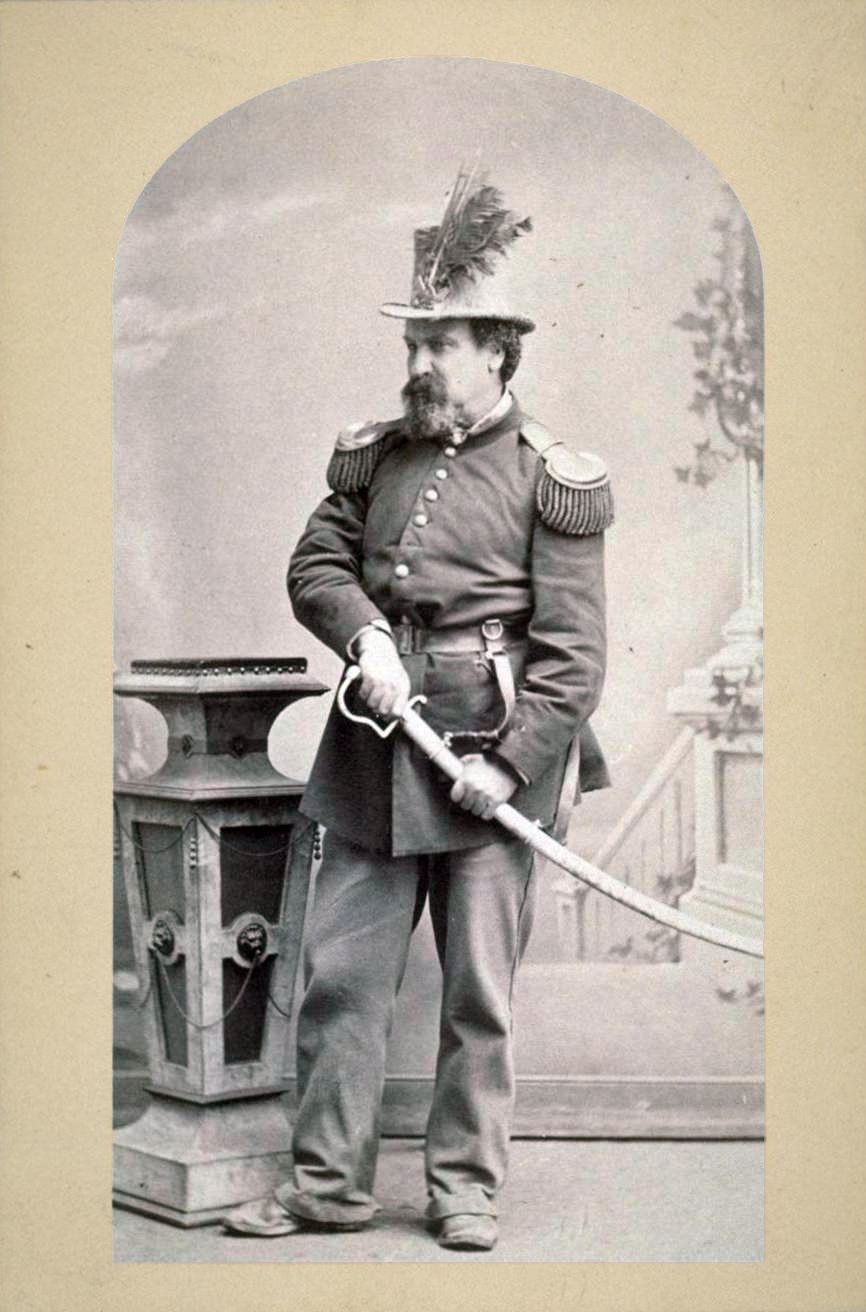
Emperor Norton in full regalia

- Joshua Abraham Norton (pictured), self-declared "Emperor of these United States" and subsequently "Protector of Mexico", collapses and dies in front of Old St. Mary's Church while on his way to a lecture at the California Academy of Sciences
- Famed Scottish writer Robert Louis Stevenson honeymoons for 2 months at a played out mine on Mount Saint Helena in the northern San Francisco Bay Area, and writes a memoir about his travels in Napa Valley
1881

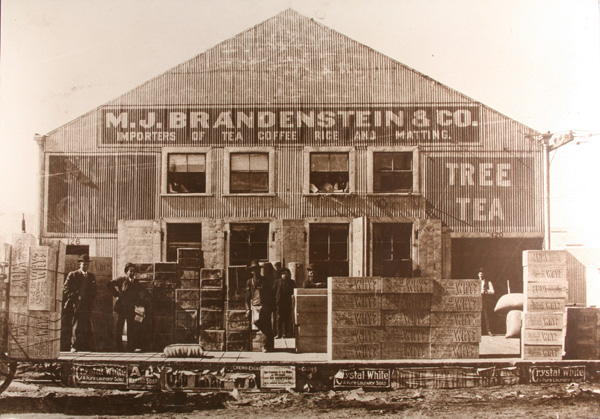
Early MJB Coffee building

- Max J. Brandenstein begins producing coffee in San Francisco (early M.J. Brandenstein facility pictured)
- A. Schilling & Company is founded in San Francisco by August Schilling and George F. Volkmann, both natives of Bremen, Germany
1882

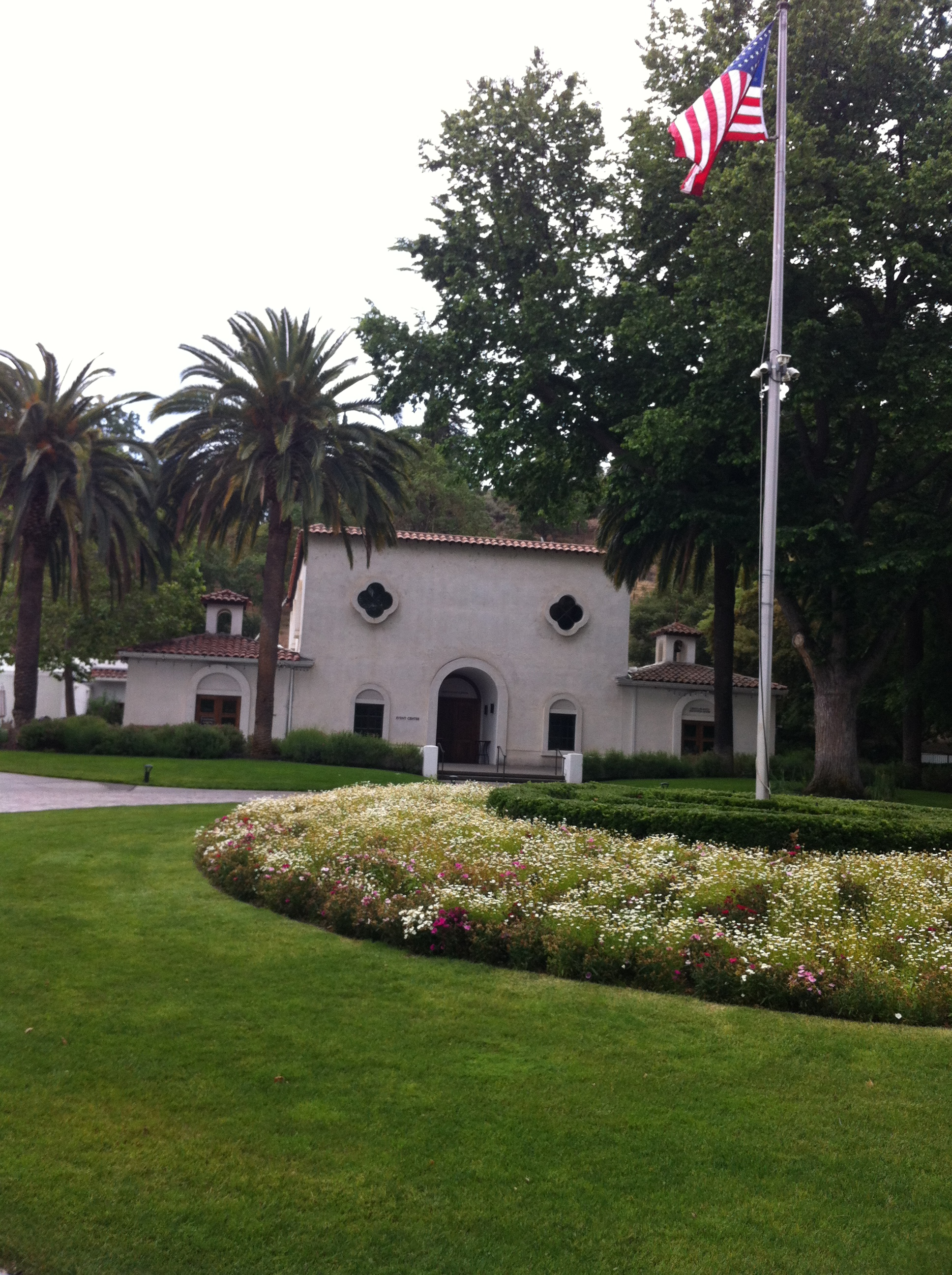
Original building at Cresta Blanca Winery

- Chateau Montelena, at the foot of Mount Saint Helena in the Napa Valley, is established
- Cresta Blanca Winery (pictured) in the Livermore Valley is established
1883

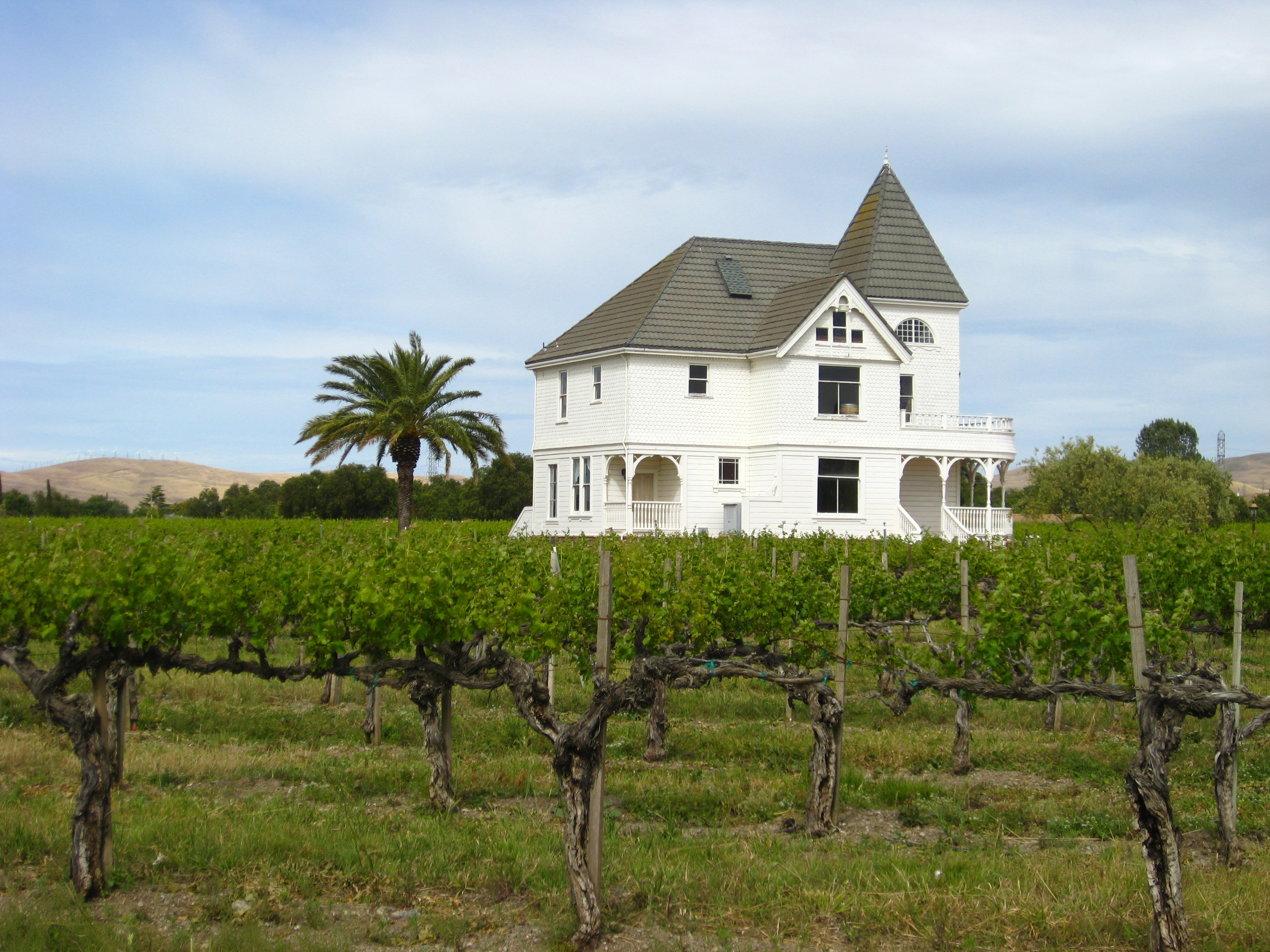
Victorian house at Concannon

- Concannon Vineyard (pictured) in the Livermore Valley is established
- Firemen on coal-burning steamers found the Pacific Coast Marine Firemen, Oilers, Watertenders and Wipers Association in San Francisco
- The Silverado Squatters, about Robert Louis Stevenson's travels in Napa Valley, is published
- Matthew Turner, his brother, and John Eckley form the Matthew Turner Shipyard at Benicia
1884

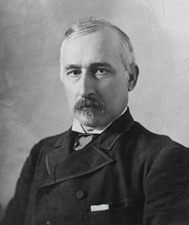
Charles Norton Felton

- Charles N. Felton (pictured) of Menlo Park is elected to the United States House of Representatives
- The California and Nevada Railroad, a narrow gauge steam railroad in the East Bay, is incorporated
- The Grand Army of the Republic opens a home for war veterans in Napa County
1885

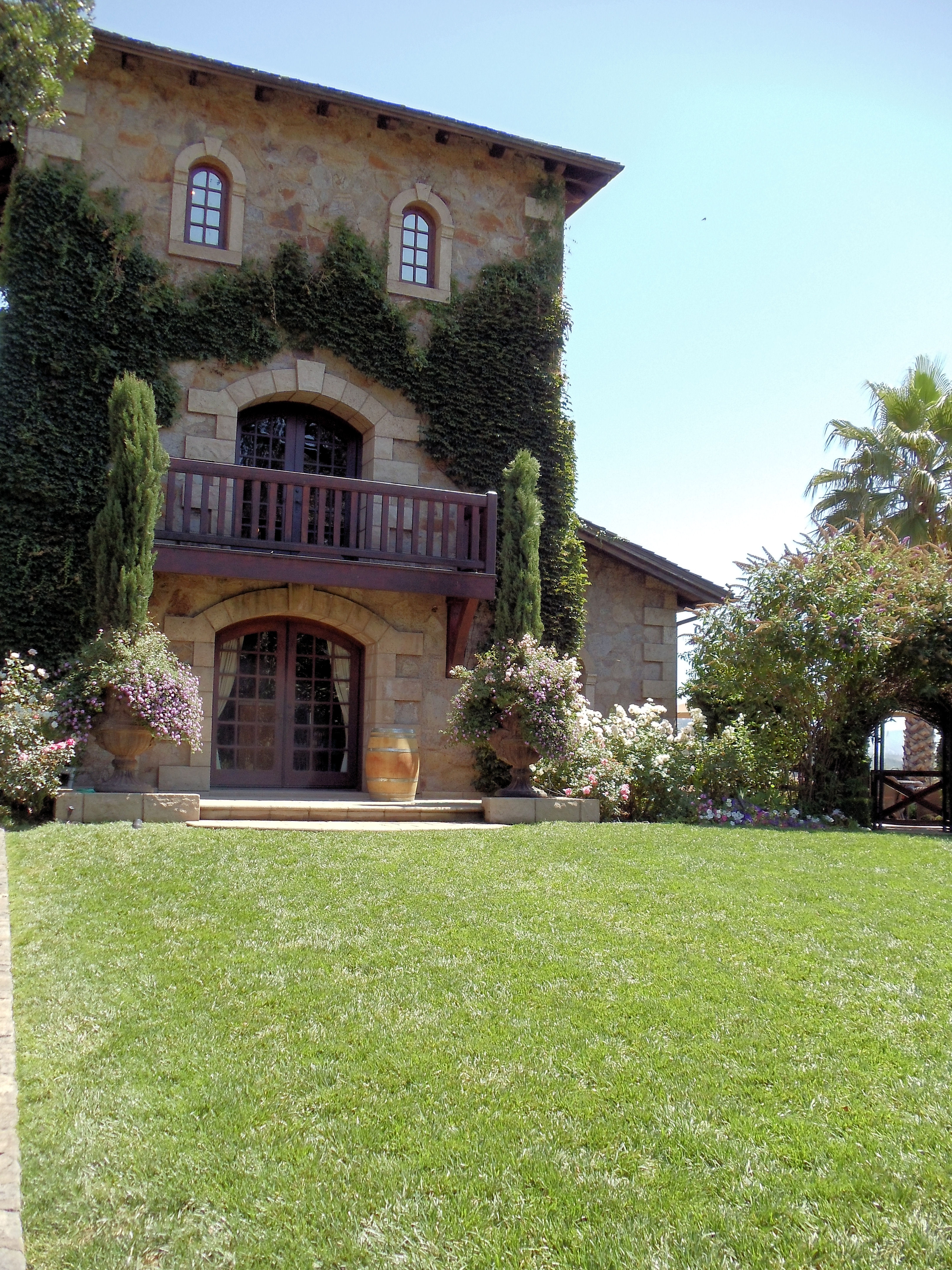
Exterior of V. Sattui Winery in St. Helena

- Alcazar Theatre in San Francisco opens
- V. Sattui Winery (pictured) in the Napa Valley is established
- Leland Stanford Junior University is founded (on paper) by Leland Stanford, former governor of and U.S. senator from California and leading railroad tycoon, and his wife, Jane Lathrop Stanford, in memory of their only child, Leland Stanford, Jr., who died of typhoid fever at age 15 the previous year.
1886

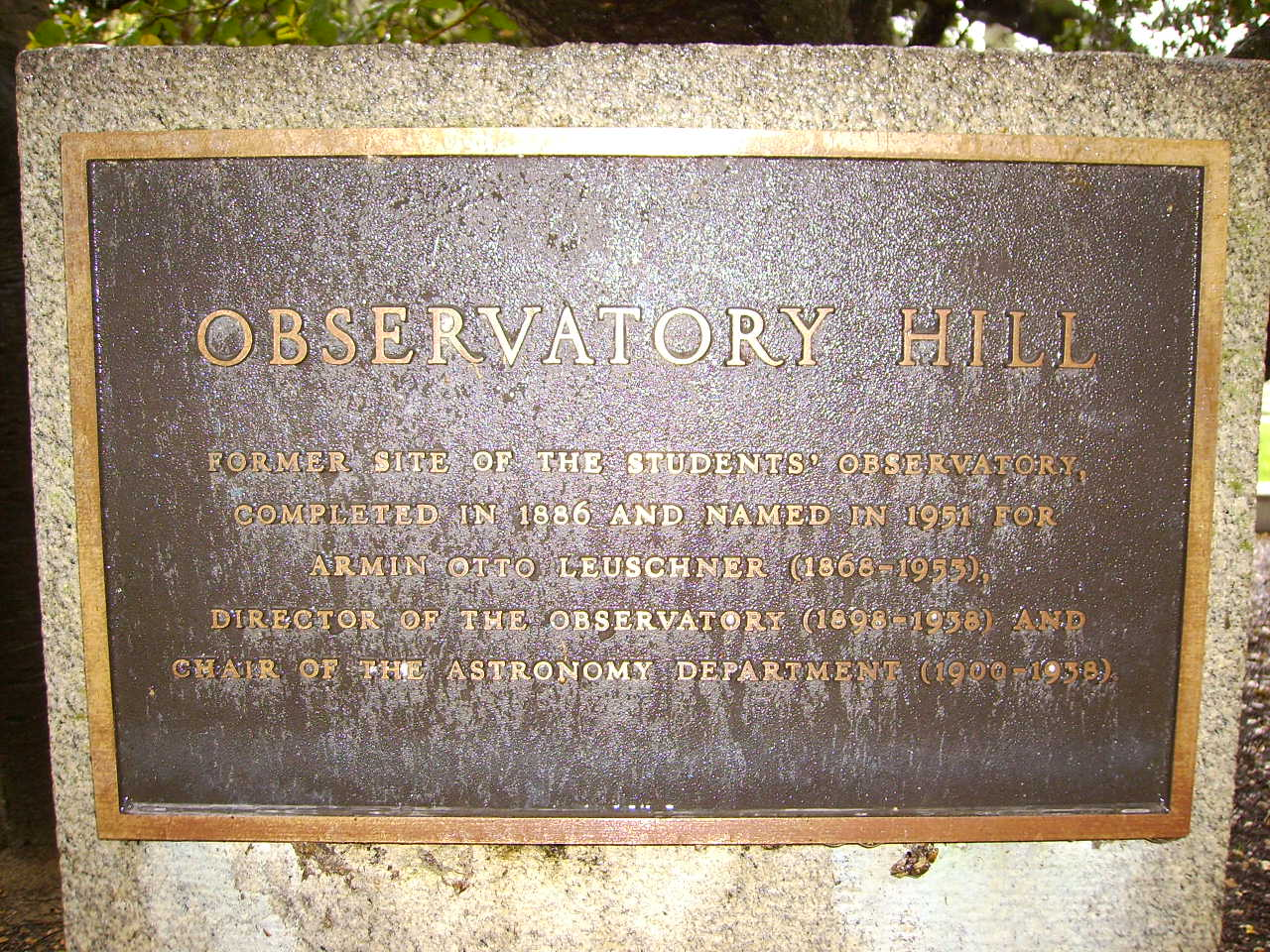
Plaque at original site of Student's Observatory

- The Aegis high school newspaper is founded in Oakland
- The Students' Observatory (historical plaque pictured) at the University of California, Berkeley is constructed
- Eshcol vineyards and winery in the Napa Valley is established
1887

Statue of John McLaren at Golden Gate Park

- The California League Baseball Grounds baseball park opens in San Francisco
- John McLaren (pictured) is appointed superintendent of the developing Golden Gate Park in San Francisco
- William Randolph Hearst takes over management of the San Francisco Examiner, which his father had received in 1880 as payment for a gambling debt
1888

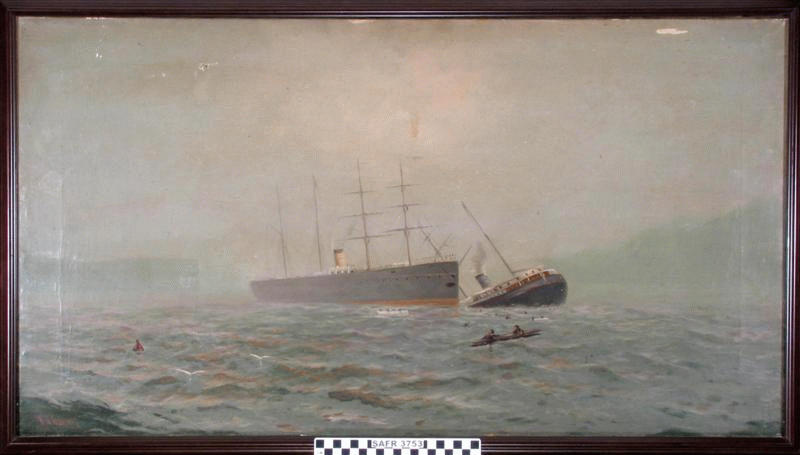
Collision of the SS City of Chester and the RMS Oceanic

- The 36-inch telescope at Lick Observatory is the largest telescope in the world when it sees first light.
- The SS City of Chester sinks after a collision (pictured) with RMS Oceanic at the Golden Gate in San Francisco Bay
- Hunt Bros. Fruit Packing Co. is founded in Sebastopol
- Swinerton construction is founded in San Francisco
1889

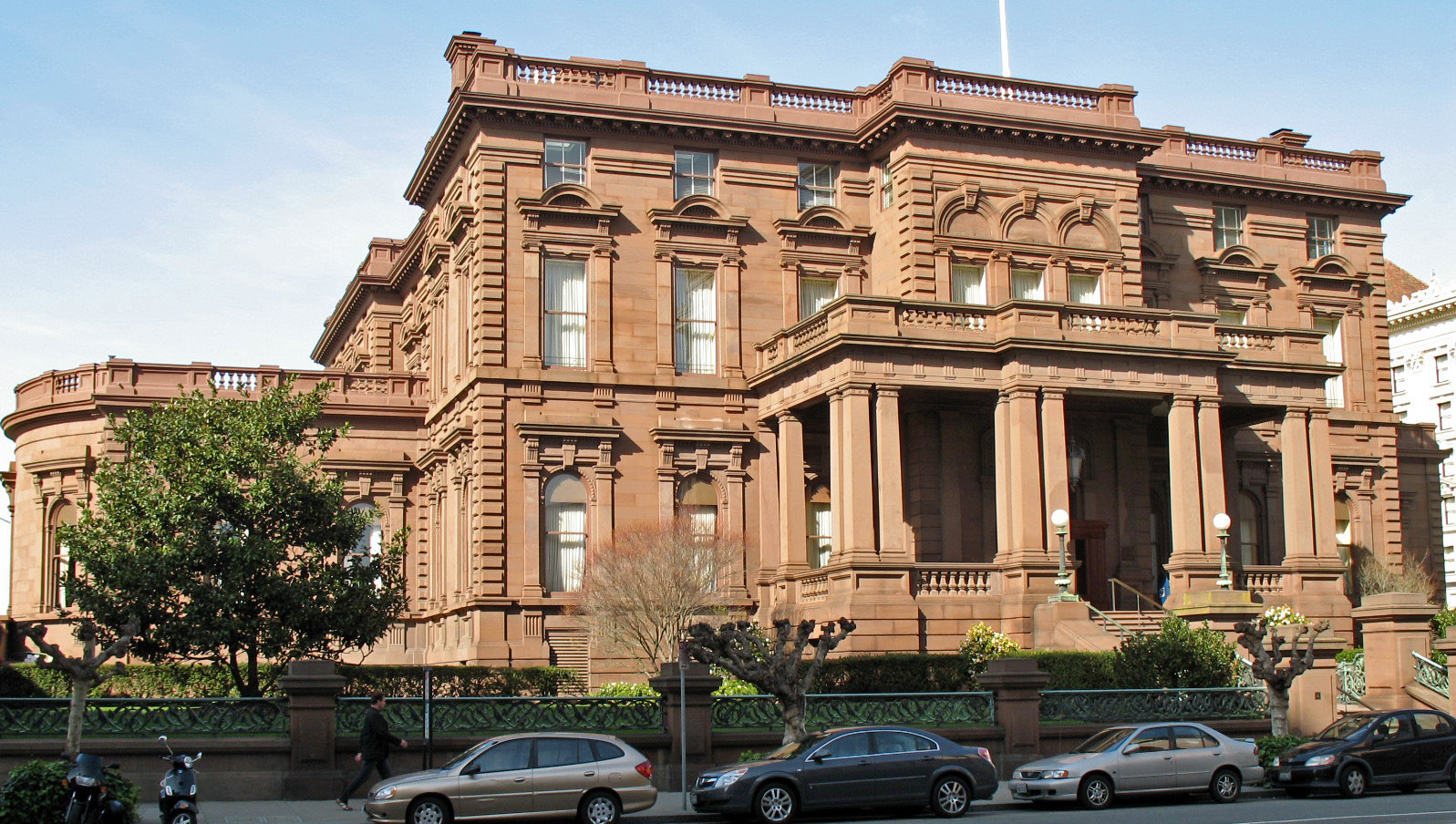
James Flood Mansion, headquarters of the Pacific-Union Club

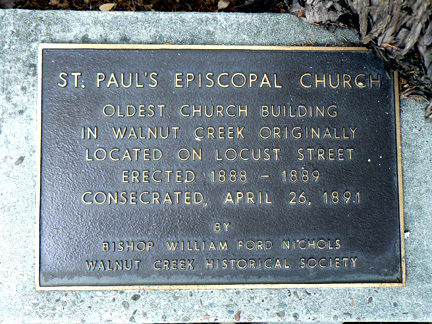
Plaque at St. Paul's Episcopal Church

- The Pacific-Union Club in San Francisco (pictured) is founded as a merger of two earlier clubs: the Pacific Club (founded 1852) and the Union Club (founded 1854)
- The Astronomical Society of the Pacific is founded in San Francisco
- Mayacamas Vineyards is established on the Mayacamas Mountains within the Napa Valley
- St. Paul's Episcopal Church (historical plaque pictured) in Walnut Creek is completed
- Livermore Valley winery Cresta Blanca's first vintage, an 1884 dry white wine, wins Grand Prize at the Paris Exposition, becoming the first California wine to win a competition in France
1890

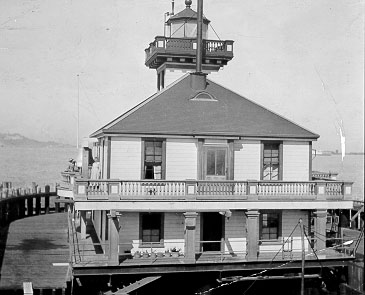
Oakland Harbor Light

- Jacob Gillig opens a carriage and wagon shop in San Francisco
- Oakland Harbor Light (pictured) is built at the Oakland Estuary
- Dominican College is founded in San Rafael
- Nichelini Winery is founded in Napa Valley
1891

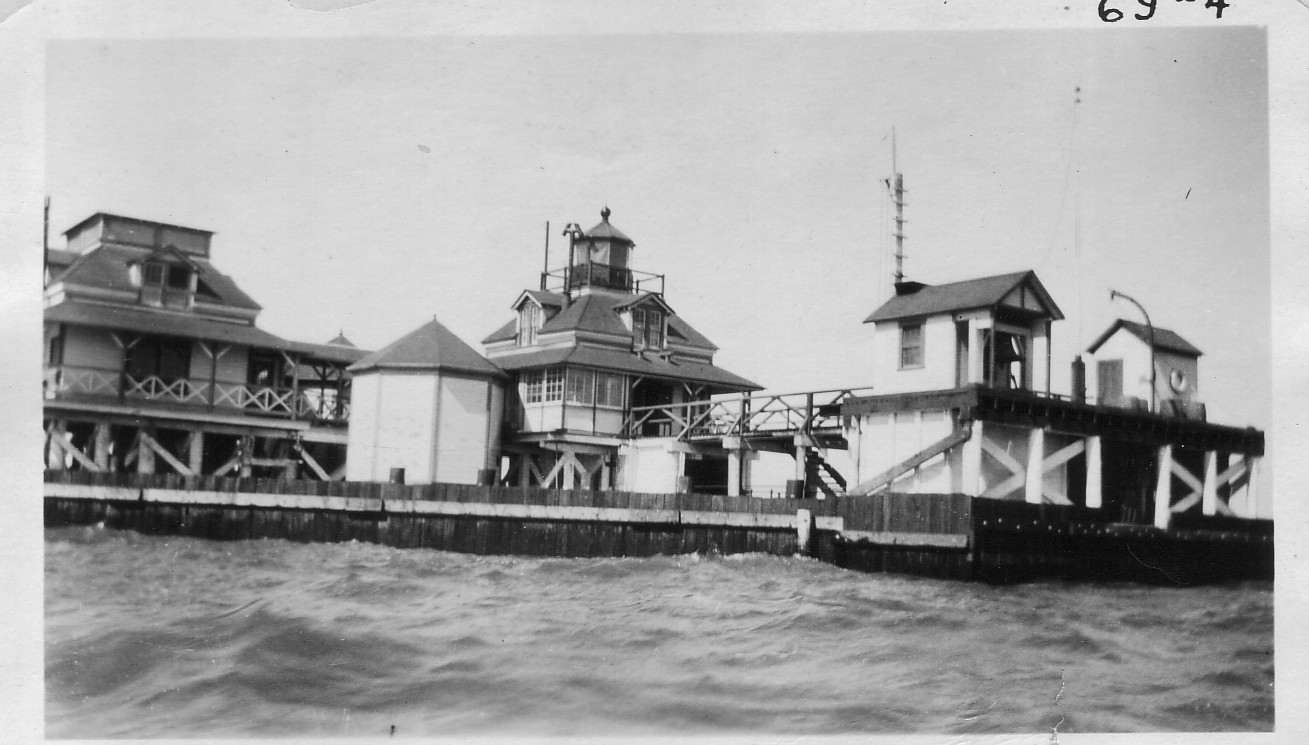
Roe Island Light

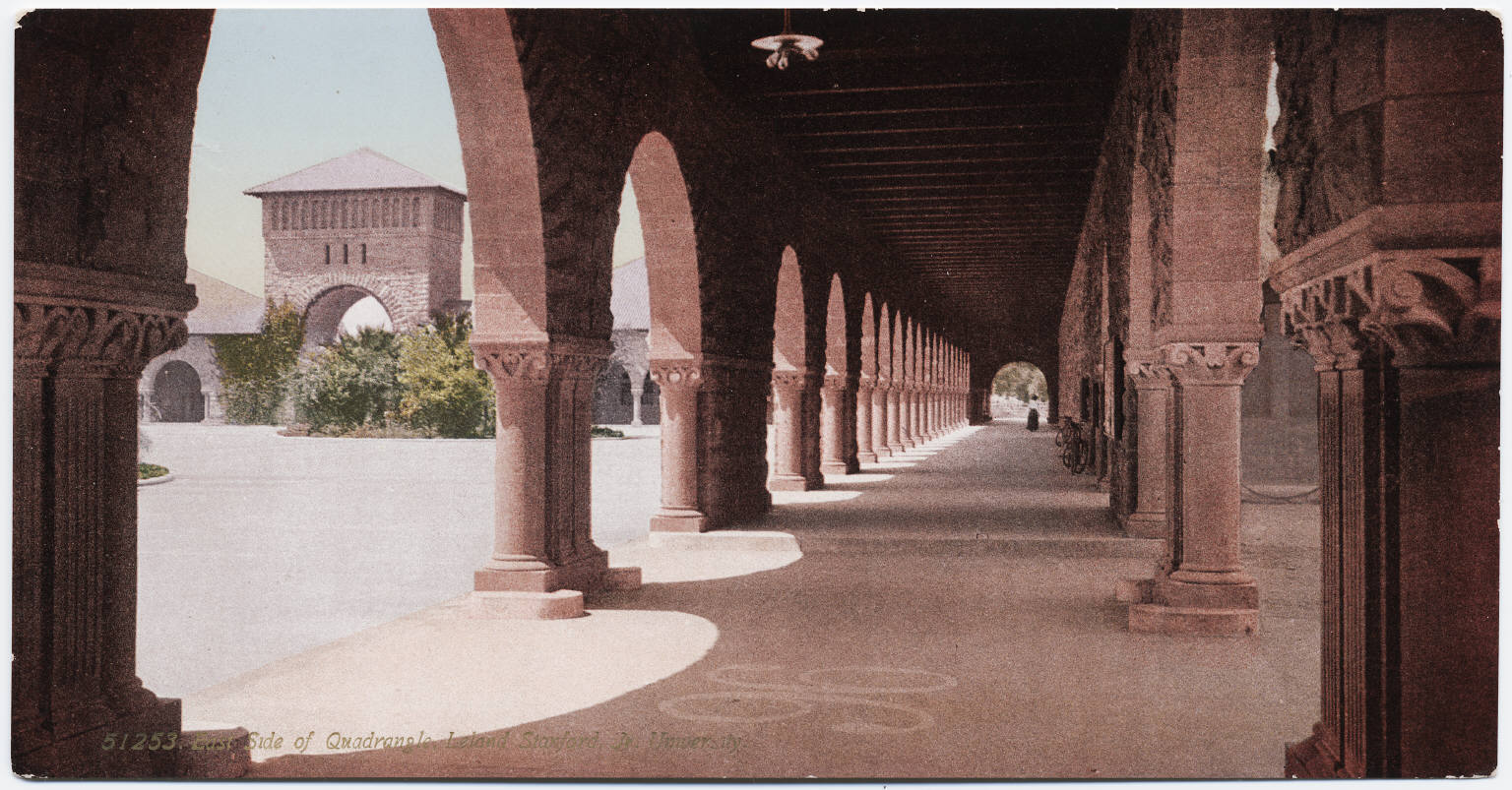
Stanford Quadrangle, c. 1896

- Roe Island Light (pictured) is built at the east end of Suisun Bay across from Port Chicago
- Stanford University (pictured) opens in Santa Clara County, with 21 departments, including the Department of the History and Art of Education
- King Kalākaua of Hawaii dies at the Palace Hotel in San Francisco
- The First Unitarian Church of Berkeley is founded
1892

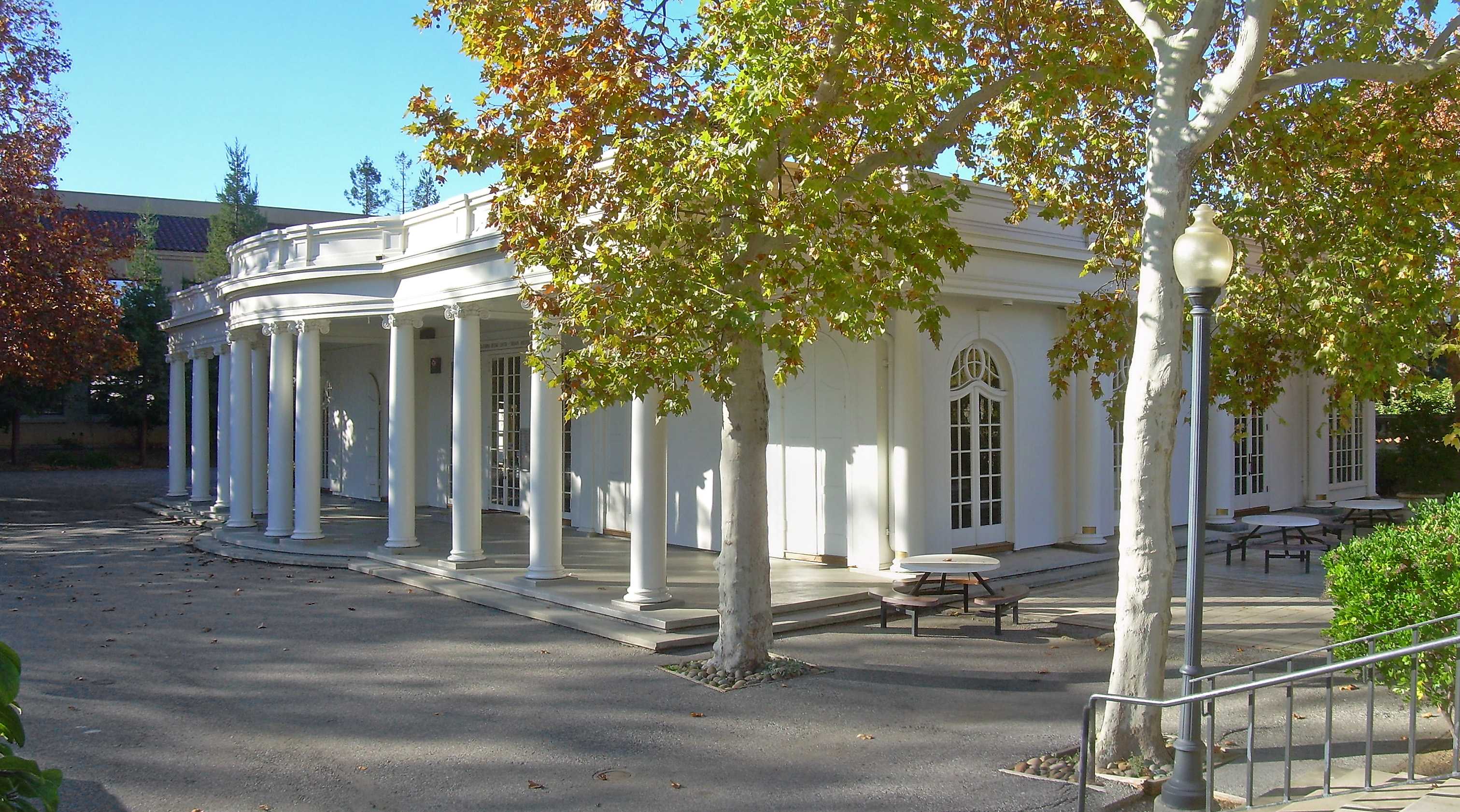
Le Petit Trianon

- Le Petit Trianon (pictured) near Santa Clara Valley is built for Charles A. Baldwin and his wife Ellen Hobart Baldwin, as the center of their wine-producing estate
- Stanford Cardinal football play the first game of their first season, 1891–1892, and shortly into the season win in their first game against California Golden Bears football
- The University of California, Berkeley Graduate School of Education is established
- Paul Masson's first sparkling wine under the name "champagne" is introduced at Almaden Valley in Santa Clara County
- The Owl Drug Company is established in San Francisco
1893

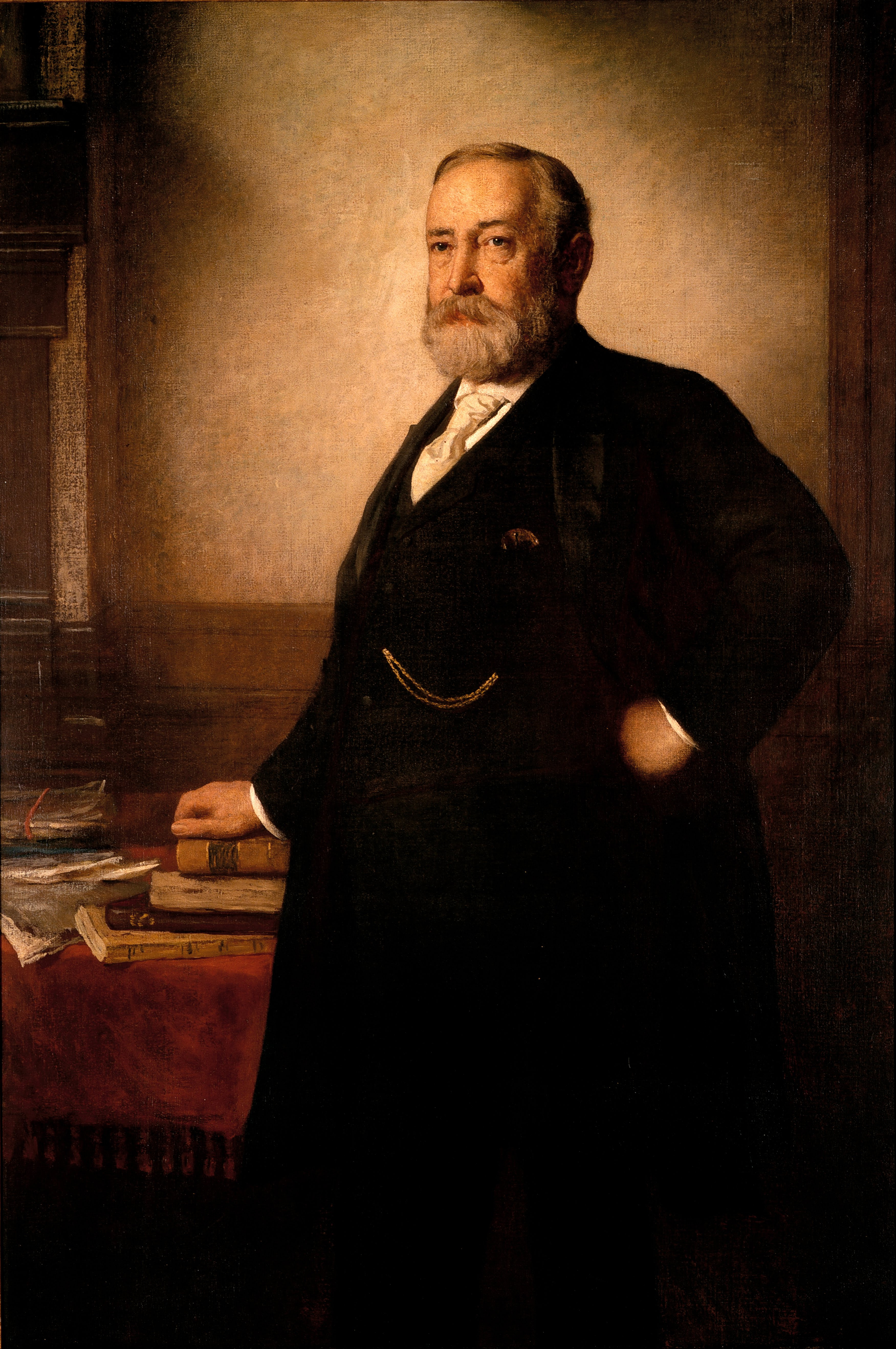
Stanford Law School founder Benjamin Harrison

- Church Divinity School of the Pacific is founded in San Mateo
- Stanford Law School (founder and former U.S. president Benjamin Harrison pictured) is established at Stanford University
- University of California Press is established at the University of California, Berkeley
1894

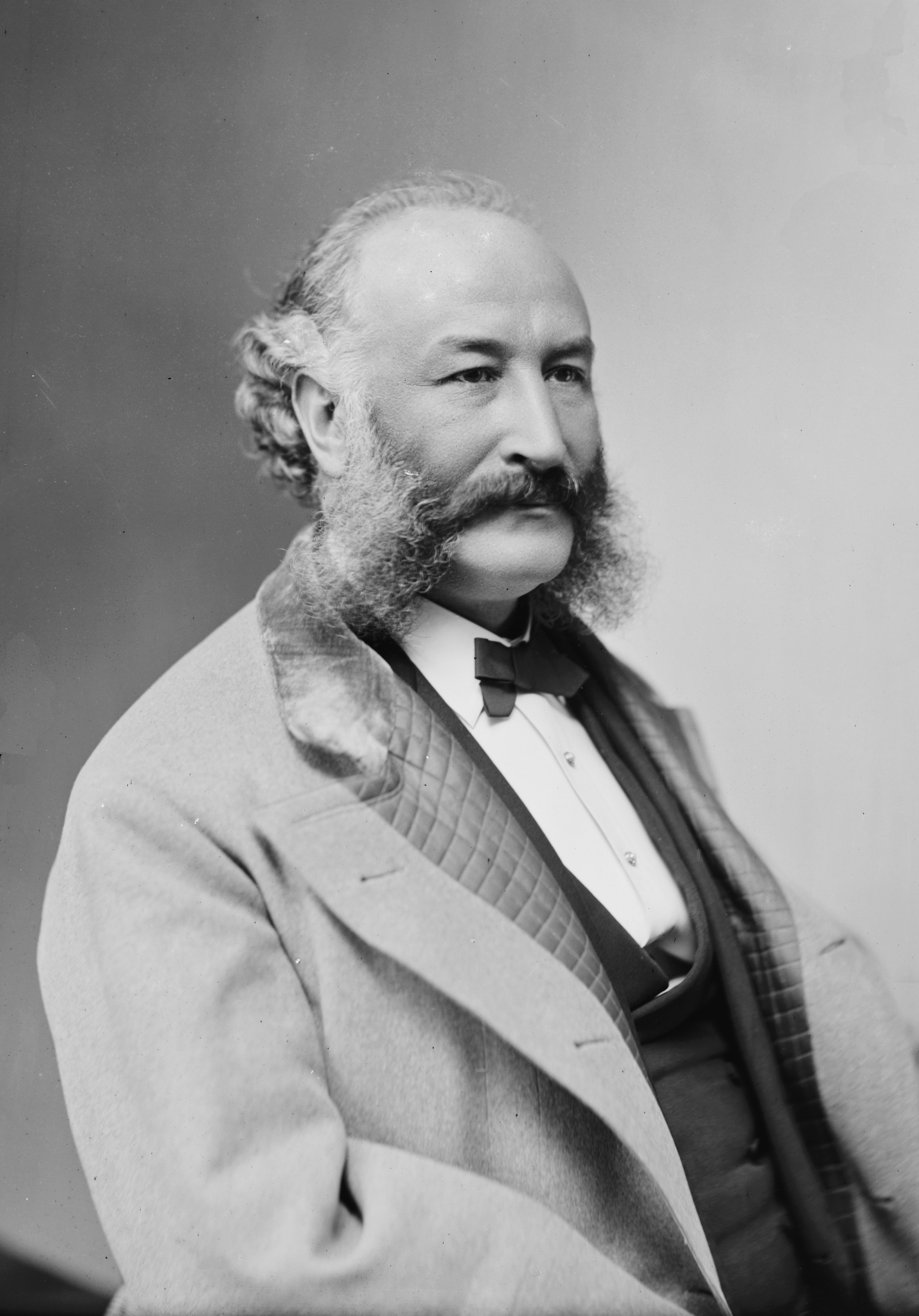
Adolph Sutro

- Adolph Sutro (pictured) is elected Mayor of San Francisco
- Fentons Creamery in Oakland is founded
- The California Midwinter International Exposition of 1894 is held in San Francisco
- Palo Alto in Santa Clara County, Pleasanton in Alameda County, and San Mateo in San Mateo County are incorporated
1895

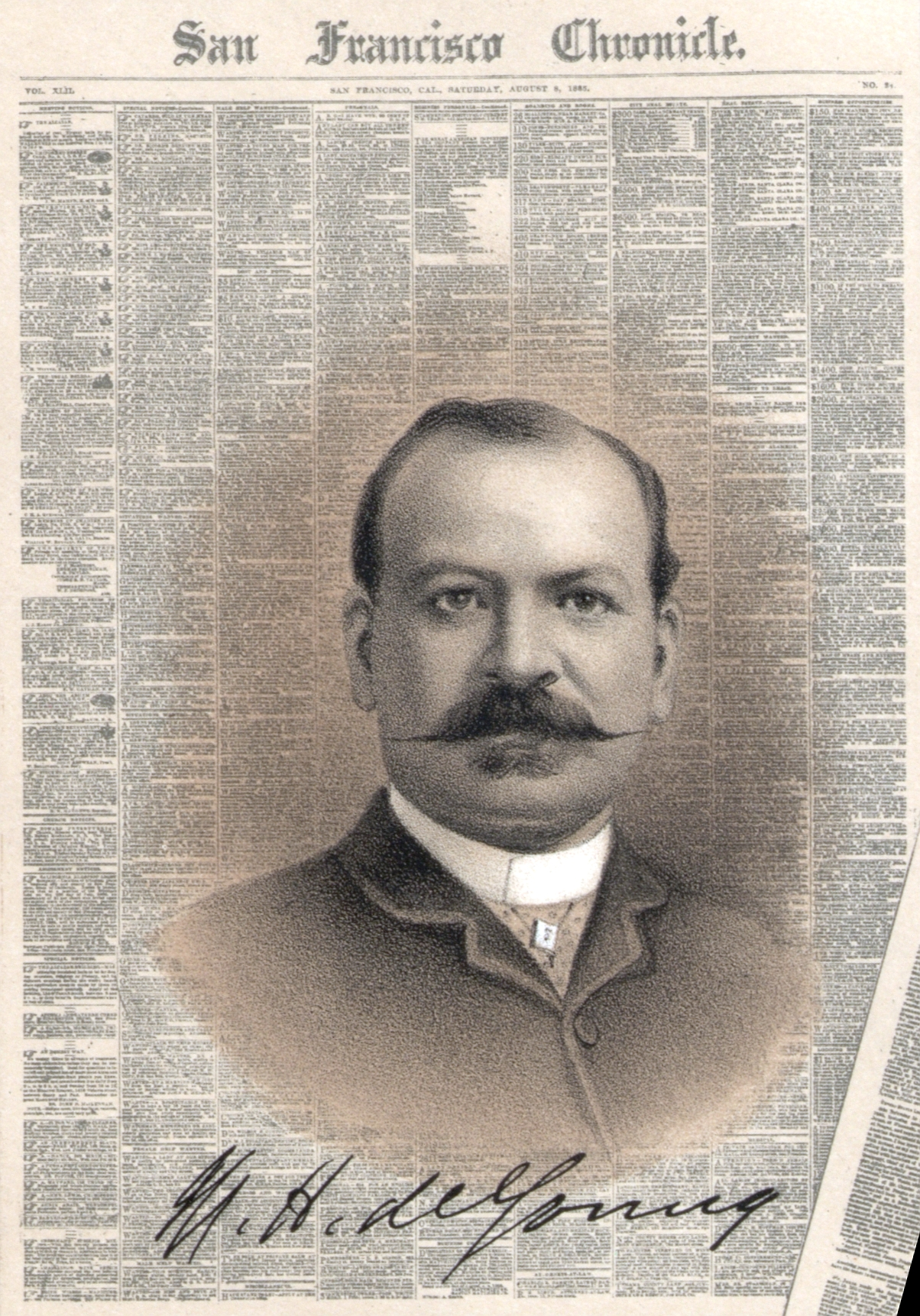
M. H. de Young and the San Francisco Chronicle in 1885

- The De Young museum is founded in San Francisco by San Francisco Chronicle publisher M. H. de Young (pictured) as an outgrowth of the California Midwinter International Exposition of 1894
- Landscape designer Makoto Hagiwara creates the Japanese Tea Garden in Golden Gate Park
- The Native Sons of the Golden State, a Chinese benevolent society, is founded in San Francisco
- John Van Denburgh completes his organizing of the herpetology department of the California Academy of Sciences
1896

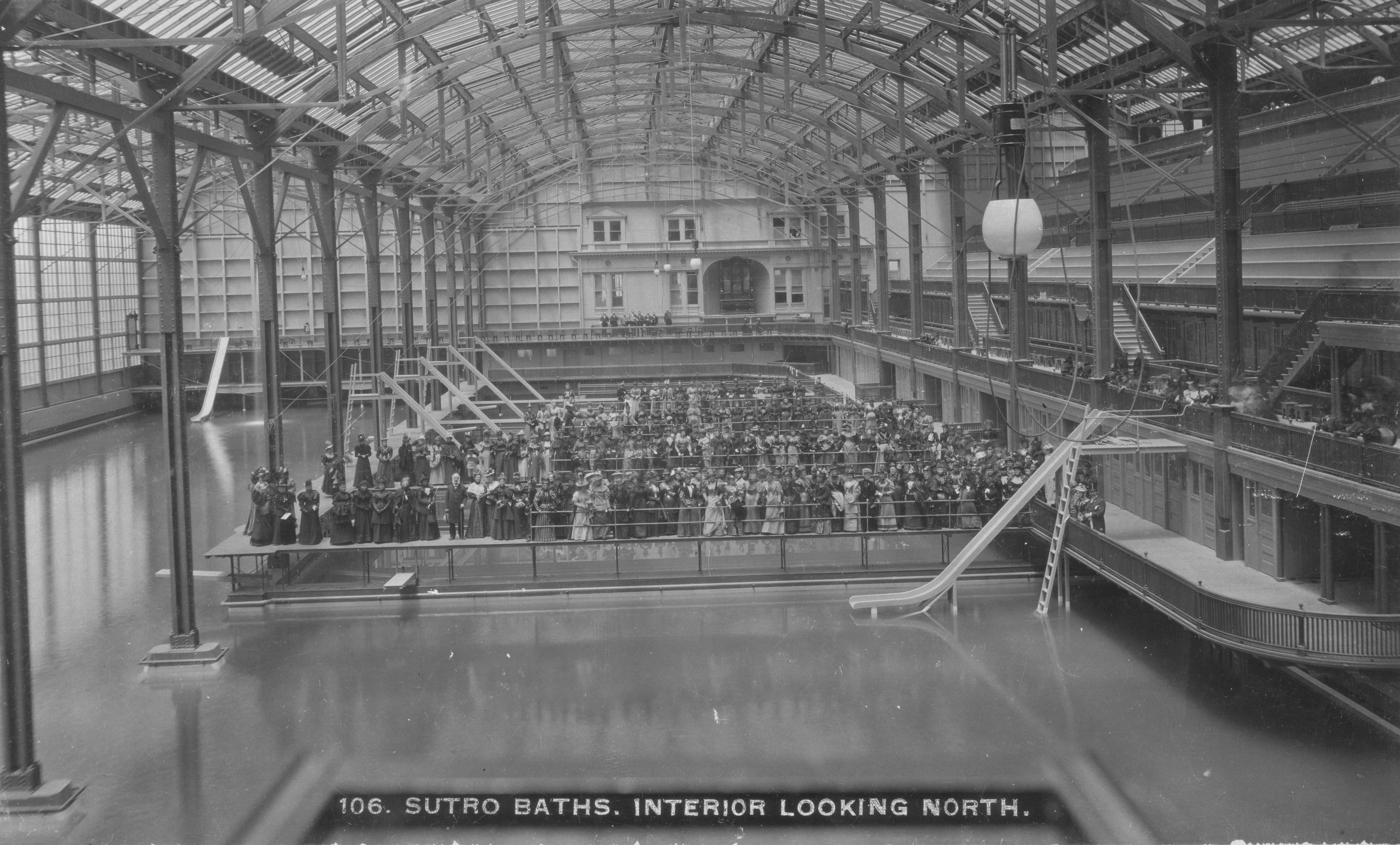
Sutro Baths

James D. Phelan

- The Sutro Baths (pictured) north of Ocean Beach, San Francisco open to the public
- Native son James D. Phelan (pictured) is elected mayor of San Francisco
- Molinari's delicatessen in San Francisco's North Beach is founded
- Colombo Baking Company is founded in the Bay Area
- Anchor Brewing Company is founded in San Francisco
1897

Penicillin chemical structure, a Cutter labs product

- Cutter Laboratories in Berkeley is founded (penicillin chemical structure pictured)
- The Evening Press and Sonoma Democrat are merged to create The Press Democrat in Santa Rosa
- Californio and former Contra Costa County Supervisor Víctor Castro dies
1898

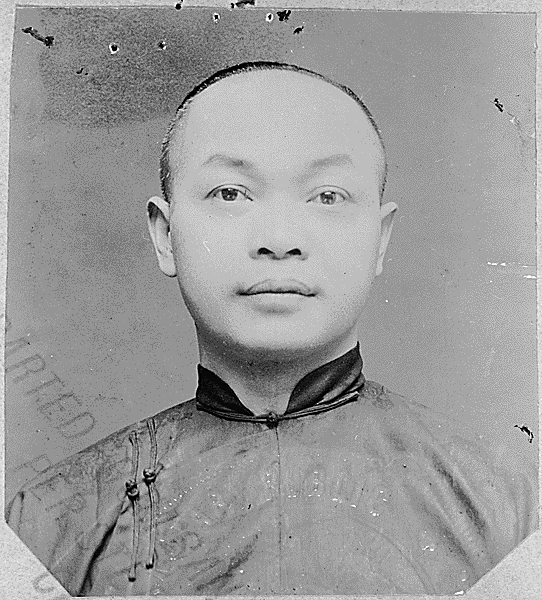
Wong Kim Ark

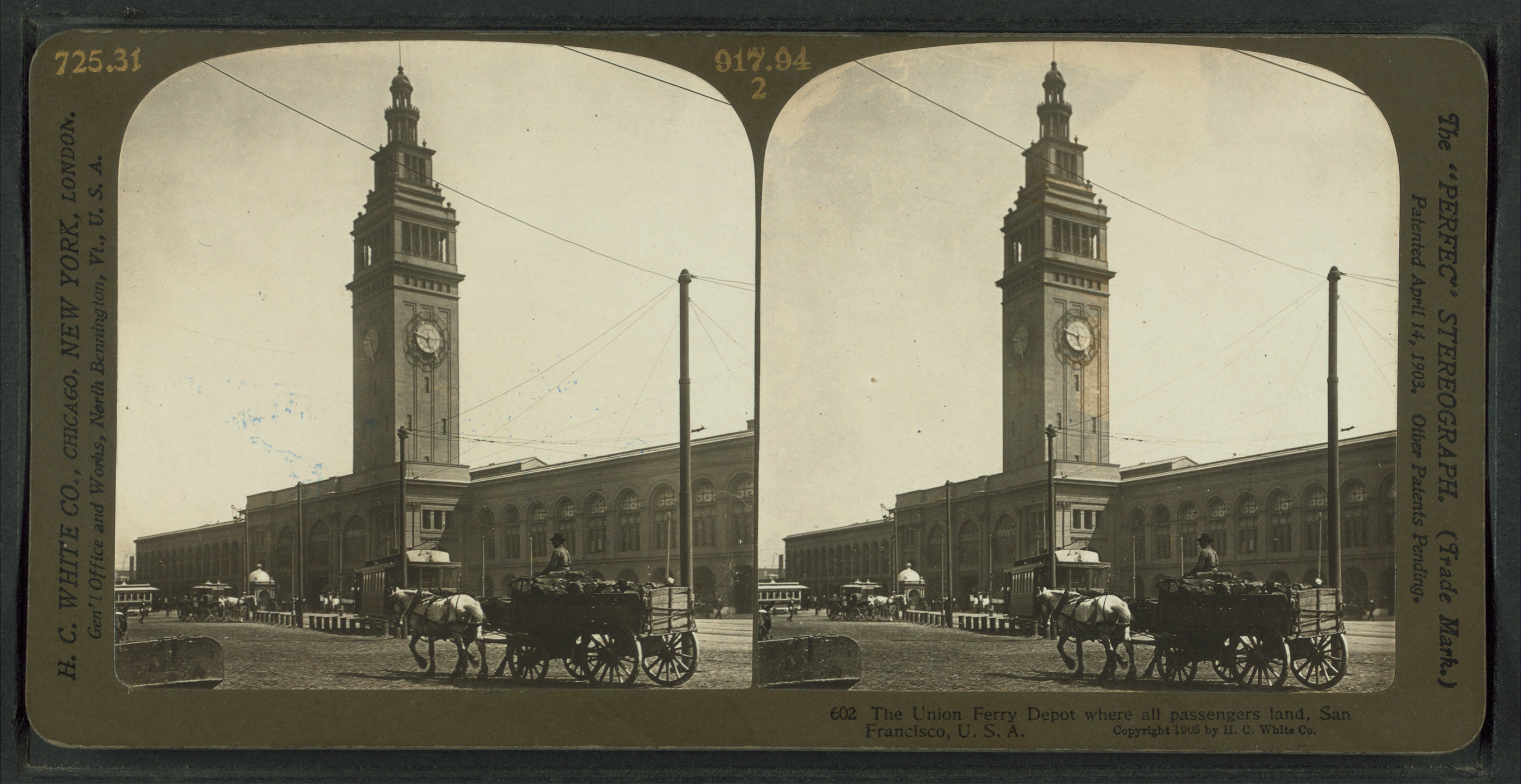
Early Ferry building stereoscope, prior to the 1906 earthquake

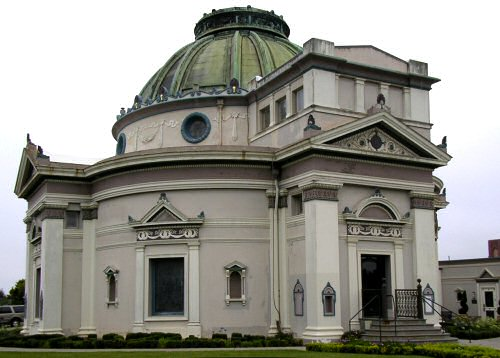
Neptune Society Columbarium

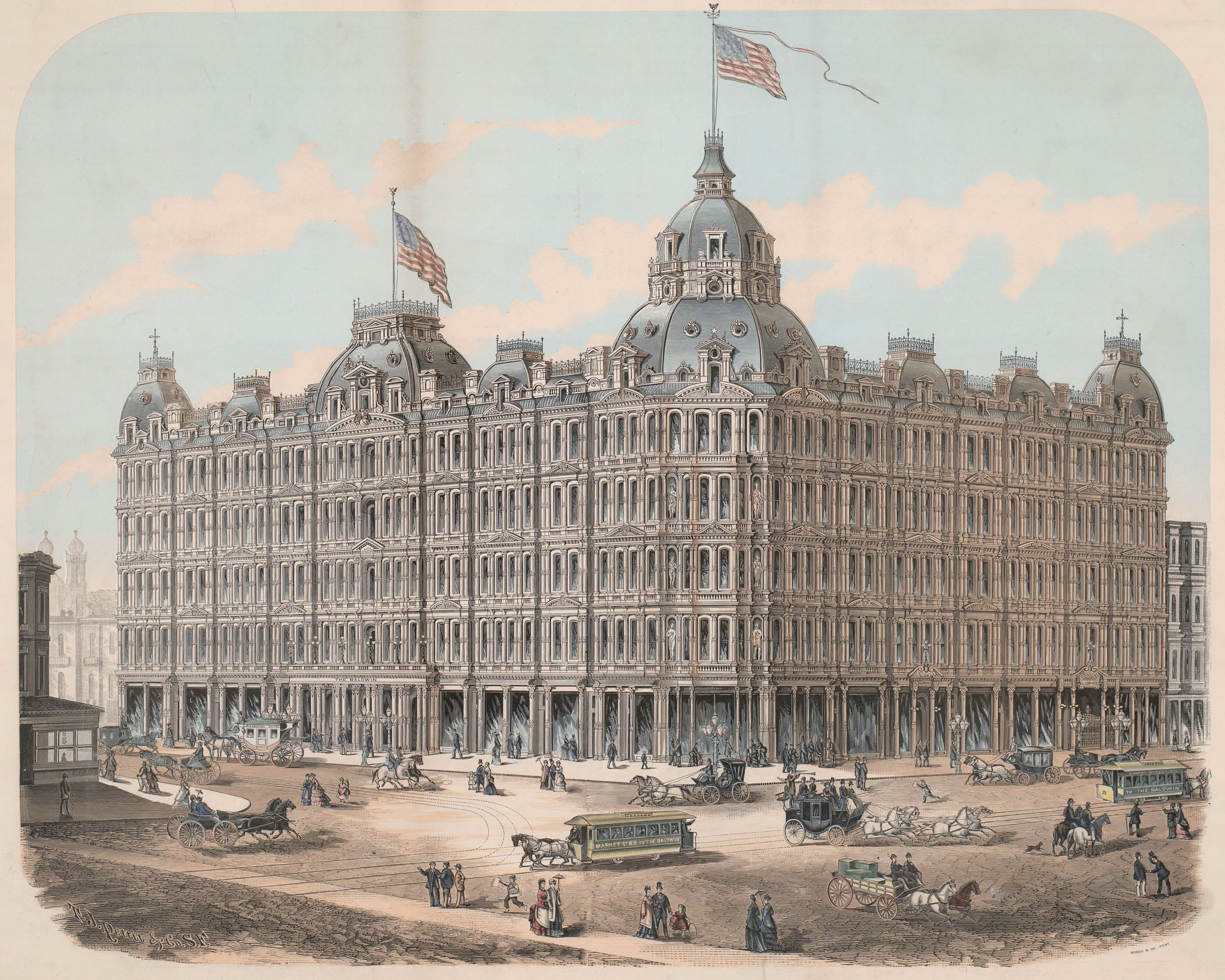
Baldwin Hotel

• United States v. Wong Kim Ark is decided in favor of Wong Kim Ark (pictured, left), who is thus considered a U.S. citizen
• The San Francisco Ferry Building (pictured, right), designed by A. Page Brown, opens
• A columbarium (pictured, right) is built at Odd Fellows Cemetery in San Francisco by Bernard J. S. Cahill, to complement an earlier columbarium built by him
• The Baldwin Hotel (pictured, right) in San Francisco, built in 1876, burns down
• Francis K. Shattuck dies after being knocked down by a man exiting from a train that Shattuck was attempting to board on the eponymous Shattuck Avenue

1899

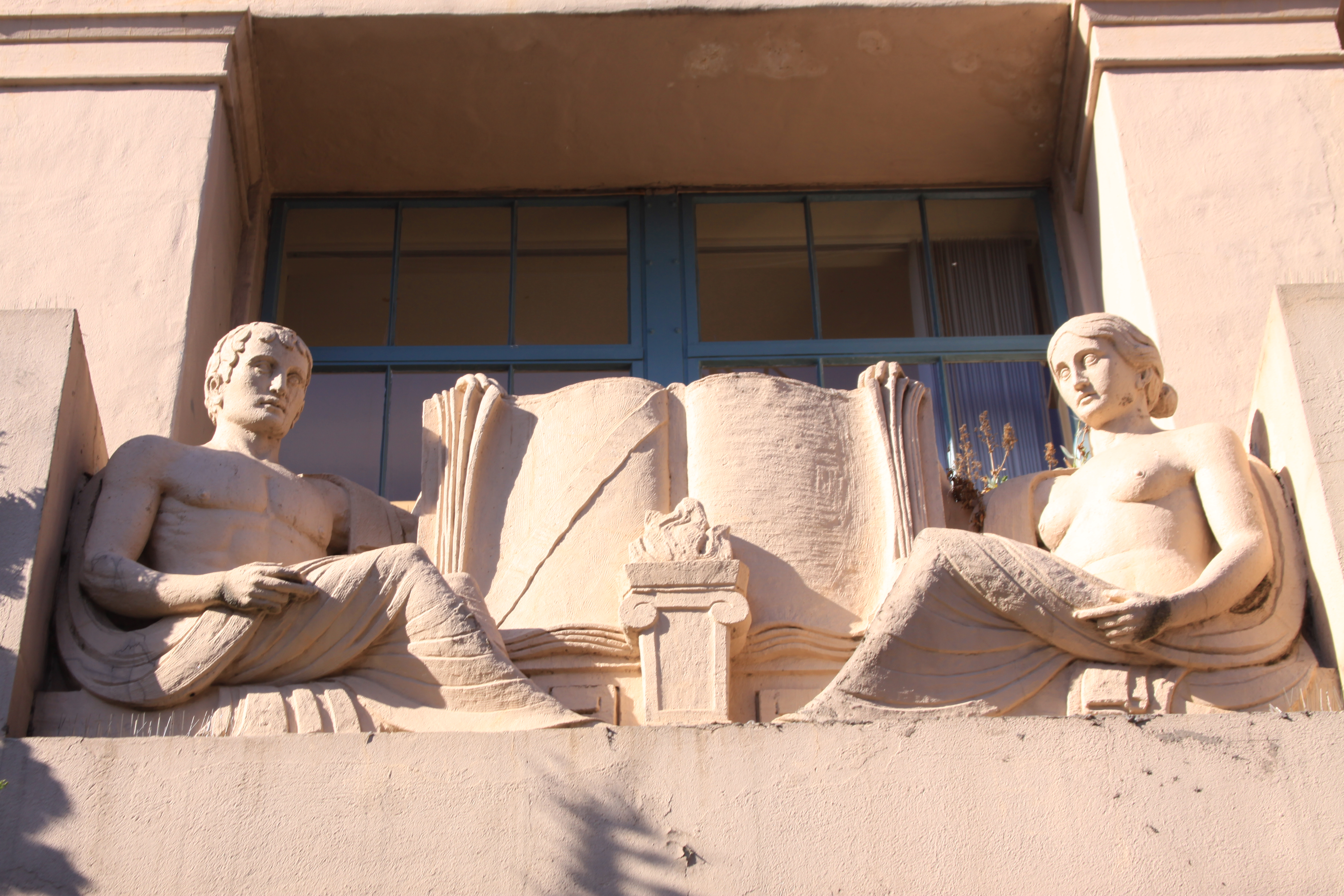
Architectural detail from the SF Teacher's College period

- San Francisco State Normal School (later architectural element pictured) is established
- Botanist Willis Linn Jepson receives his Ph.D. degree from, and is made assistant professor at, the University of California, Berkeley
- McTeague by Frank Norris is published
1900

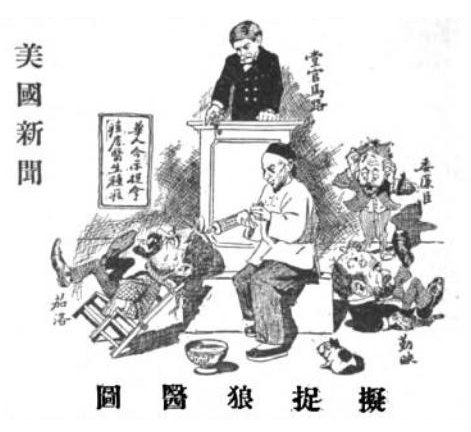
Political cartoon during the plague years

- An epidemic of bubonic plague centered on San Francisco's Chinatown begins, the first plague epidemic in the continental United States (reviled investigator Joseph J. Kinyoun pictured)
- The California Automobile Company is founded in San Francisco
- The Sempervirens Club is founded with the goal of preserving old growth coast redwood forest in the Santa Cruz Mountains
- The World's Drinks And How To Mix Them, by William "Cocktail" Boothby, is published by the Palace Hotel, San Francisco

== 20th century ==
1901

Phoebe Hearst

- The Lowie Museum of Anthropology is established in San Francisco by patron Phoebe Hearst (pictured), to house items for the University of California, Berkeley.
- The Family, a private club in San Francisco, California, is formed by newspapermen who had left the Bohemian Club
- The California Society of Artists is founded in San Francisco by Xavier Martínez, Maynard Dixon, Gottardo Piazzoni, Matteo Sandona and other artists disaffected with the San Francisco Art Association
- YMCA Evening College in San Francisco opens its law school, becoming a full-fledged college
- The Paul Masson Mountain Winery is established by Paul Masson in Saratoga
- The SS City of Rio de Janeiro shipwrecks off the shores of San Francisco at the Golden Gate
- A light bulb is installed at a Livermore fire station
1902

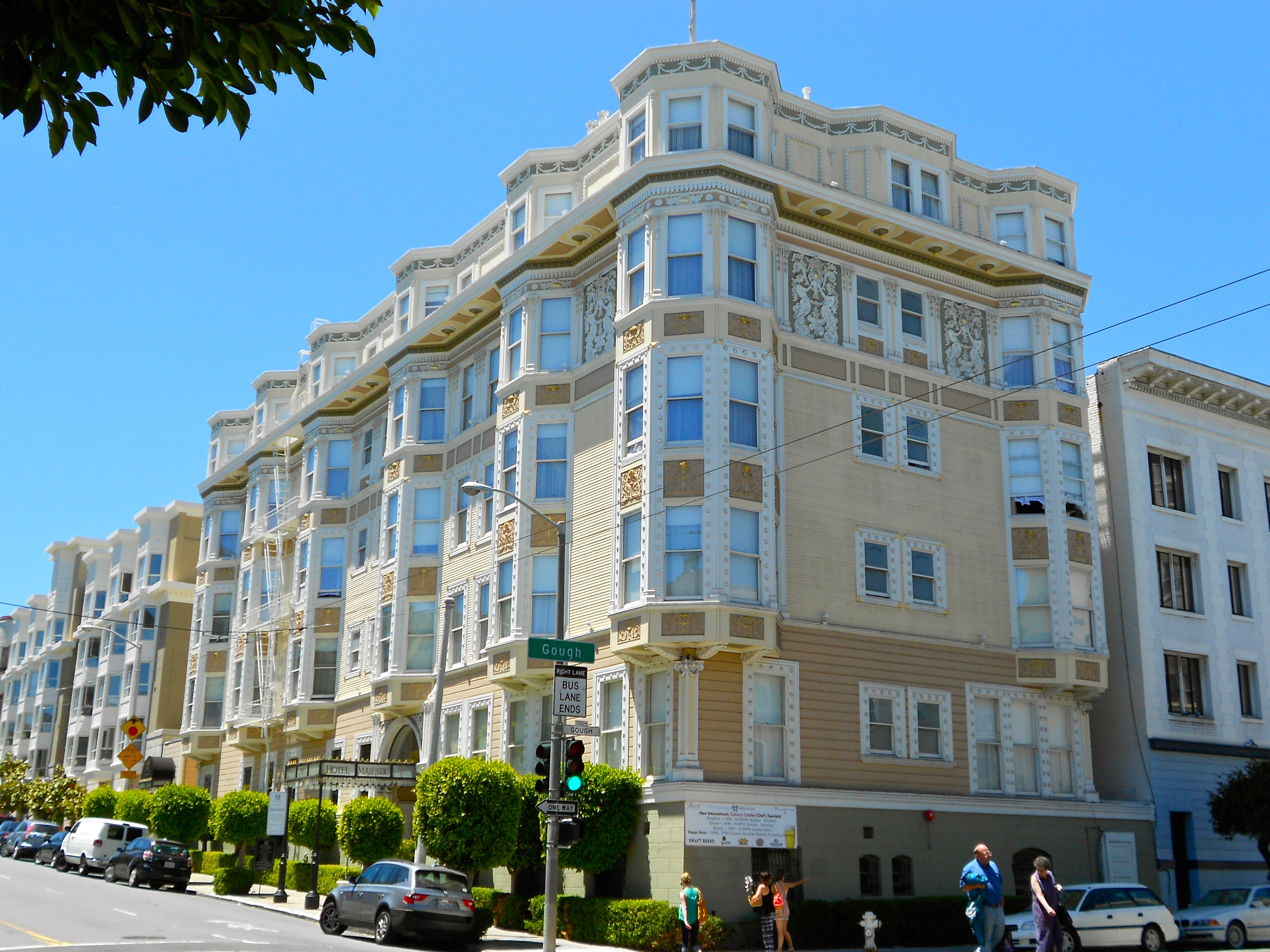
Hotel Majestic

- Hotel Majestic (pictured) in San Francisco is built.
- The Carpenter Gothic Victorian St. Thomas Aquinas Church is completed in Palo Alto
- Big Basin Redwoods State Park is established in the Santa Cruz Mountains
1903

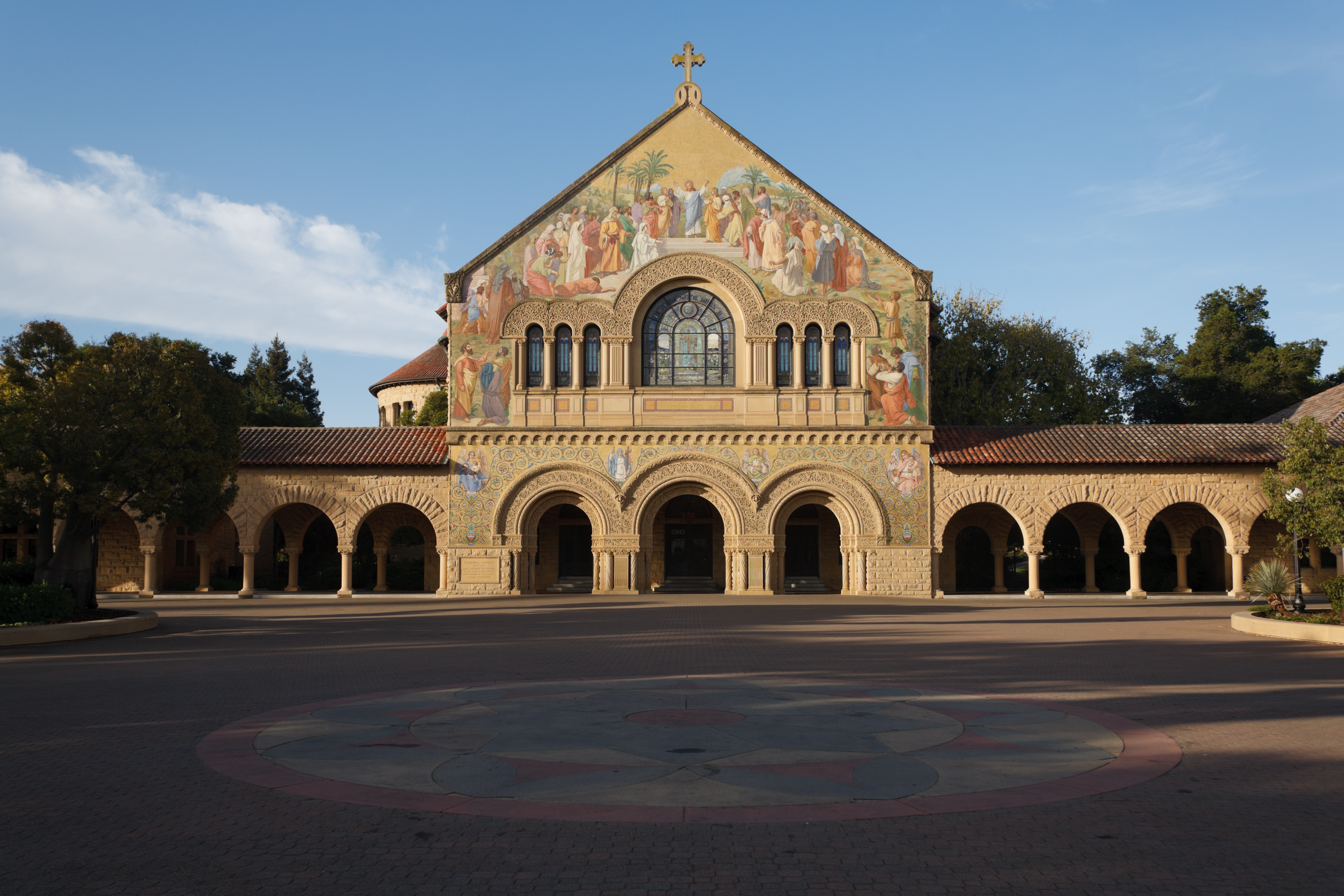
Stanford Memorial Church

- Stanford Memorial Church (pictured) at Stanford University, designed by architect Charles A. Coolidge, is dedicated
- George A. Wyman becomes the first person to ride a motorcycle (and the first using any motor vehicle) across the US, from San Francisco to New York City
- The Alameda Free Library is completed
- The California Pelican student humor magazine begins publishing at the University of California, Berkeley
- Pittsburg is incorporated in Contra Costa County
1904

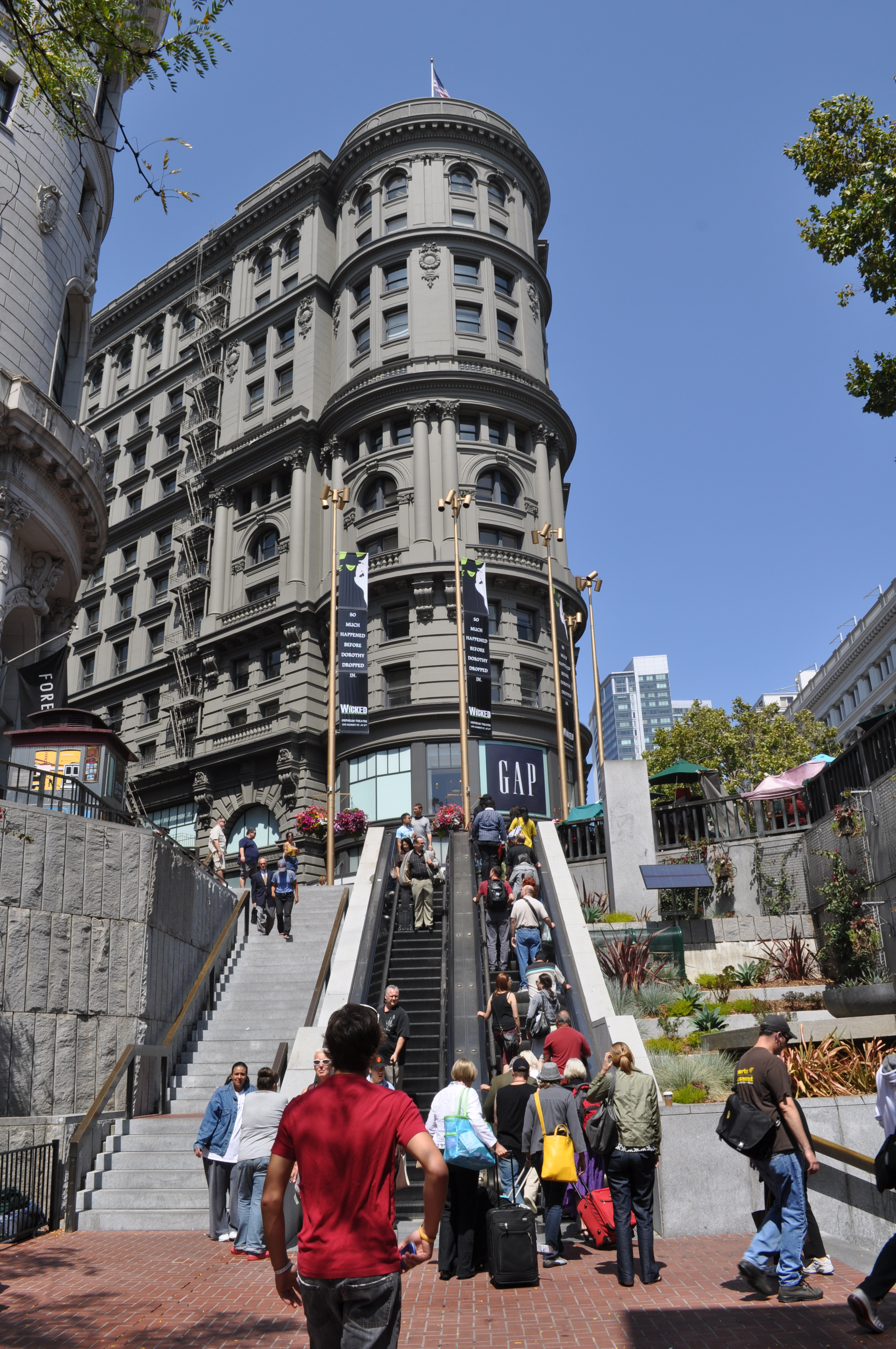
Flood Building

- The Bank of Italy is founded in San Francisco by A.P. Giannini, a San Jose born son of Italian immigrants.
- The 12-story Flood Building (pictured) in San Francisco is completed.
- The Merchants Exchange Building in San Francisco is completed
- The San Francisco Motorcycle Club is founded
1905

The "Big Four" graft prosecutors (left to right) Frances J. Heney, William J. Burns, Fremont Older and Rudolph Spreckels.

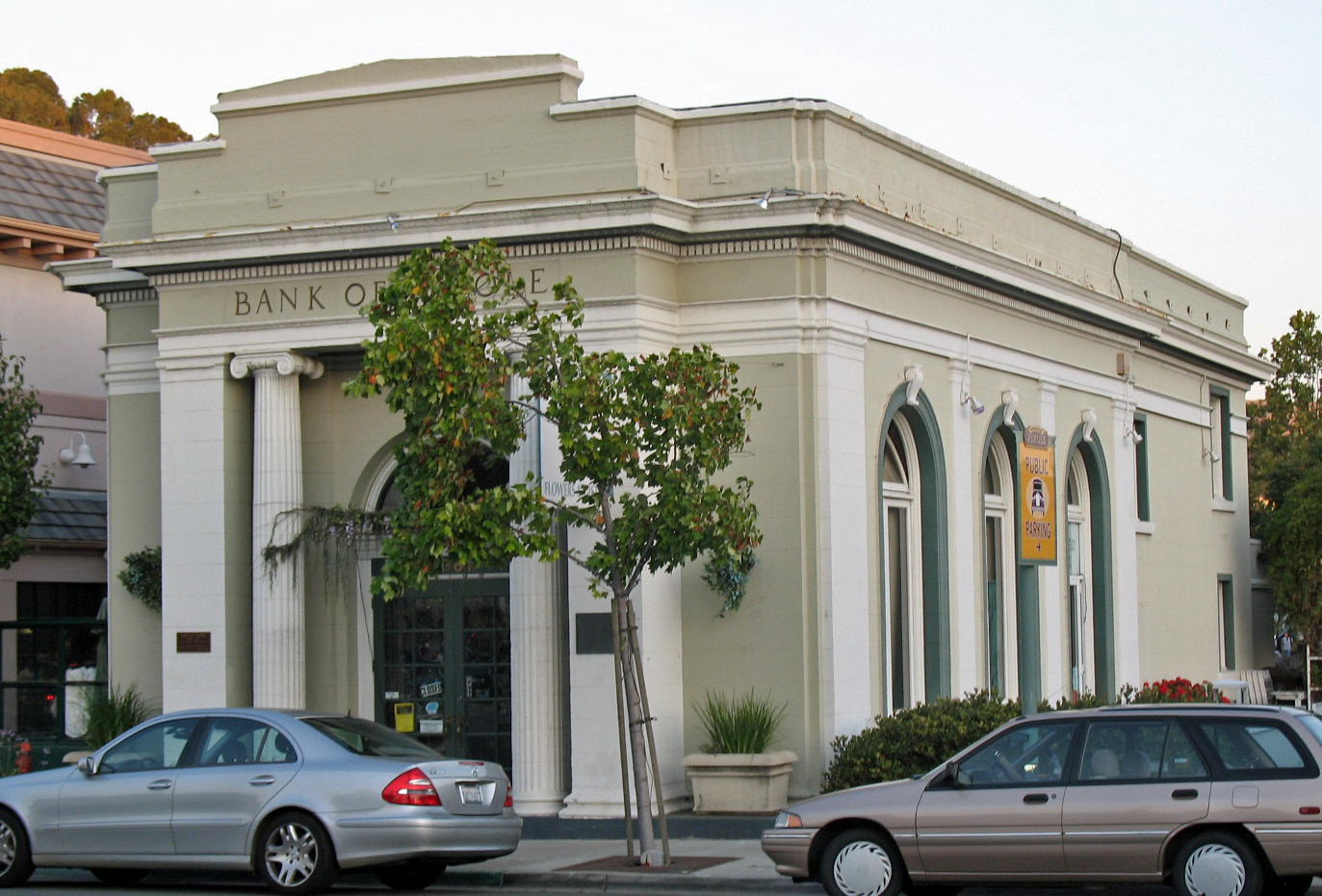
Original Bank of Pinole building

- Graft trials begin in San Francisco against mayor Eugene Schmitz, members of the San Francisco Board of Supervisors, and attorney and political boss Abe Ruef, who were receiving bribes, and business owners who were paying the bribes. (prosecutors pictured)
- Concord and Richmond are incorporated in Contra Costa County
- The Bank of Pinole (pictured) is founded in Richmond
- The Hill Opera House opens in Petaluma
- The Bancroft Library at the University of California, Berkeley is founded when the university purchases Hubert Howe Bancroft's 50,000 volumes on the history of California and the North American West
1906

Burnham's plan for San Francisco

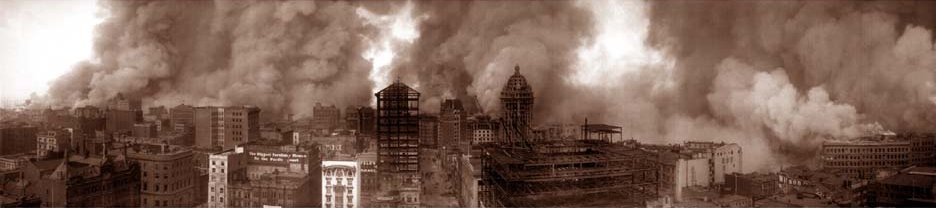
The City in flames

• On April 17, Daniel Burnham delivers plans (pictured, left) for the redesign of San Francisco
• The next day, a massive earthquake hits San Francisco, starting fires which burn much of the city to the ground. 3,000 people die during the disaster.

1907

San Francisco Mayor Eugene Schmitz

- By the end of a violent streetcar operator strike in San Francisco, thirty-one people had been killed and about 1100 injured.
- San Francisco Mayor Eugene Schmitz (pictured) is found guilty of extortion, and the office of mayor is declared vacant
- The School of the California Guild of Arts and Crafts is founded in Berkeley during the height of the Arts and Crafts movement
- Piedmont is incorporated in Alameda County
- The whaling bark Lydia wrecks on the shore of San Francisco
1908

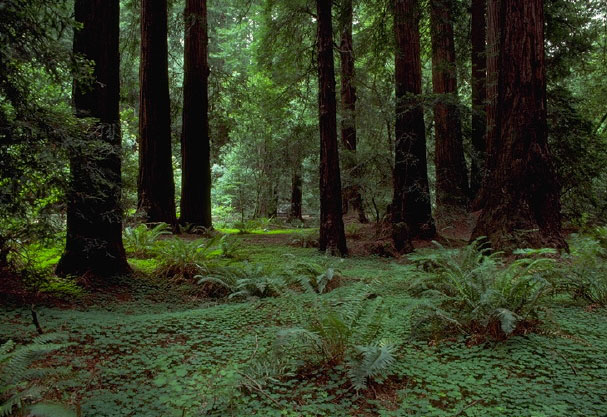
Redwood canopy undergrowth, Muir Woods

- Brisbane is incorporated in San Mateo County on the lower slopes of San Bruno Mountain
- Muir Woods National Monument (coast redwood undergrowth pictured) is established in Marin County
- Cooper Medical College is acquired by Stanford University and renamed the Stanford University School of Medicine
- Brown's Opera House opens in San Francisco
1909

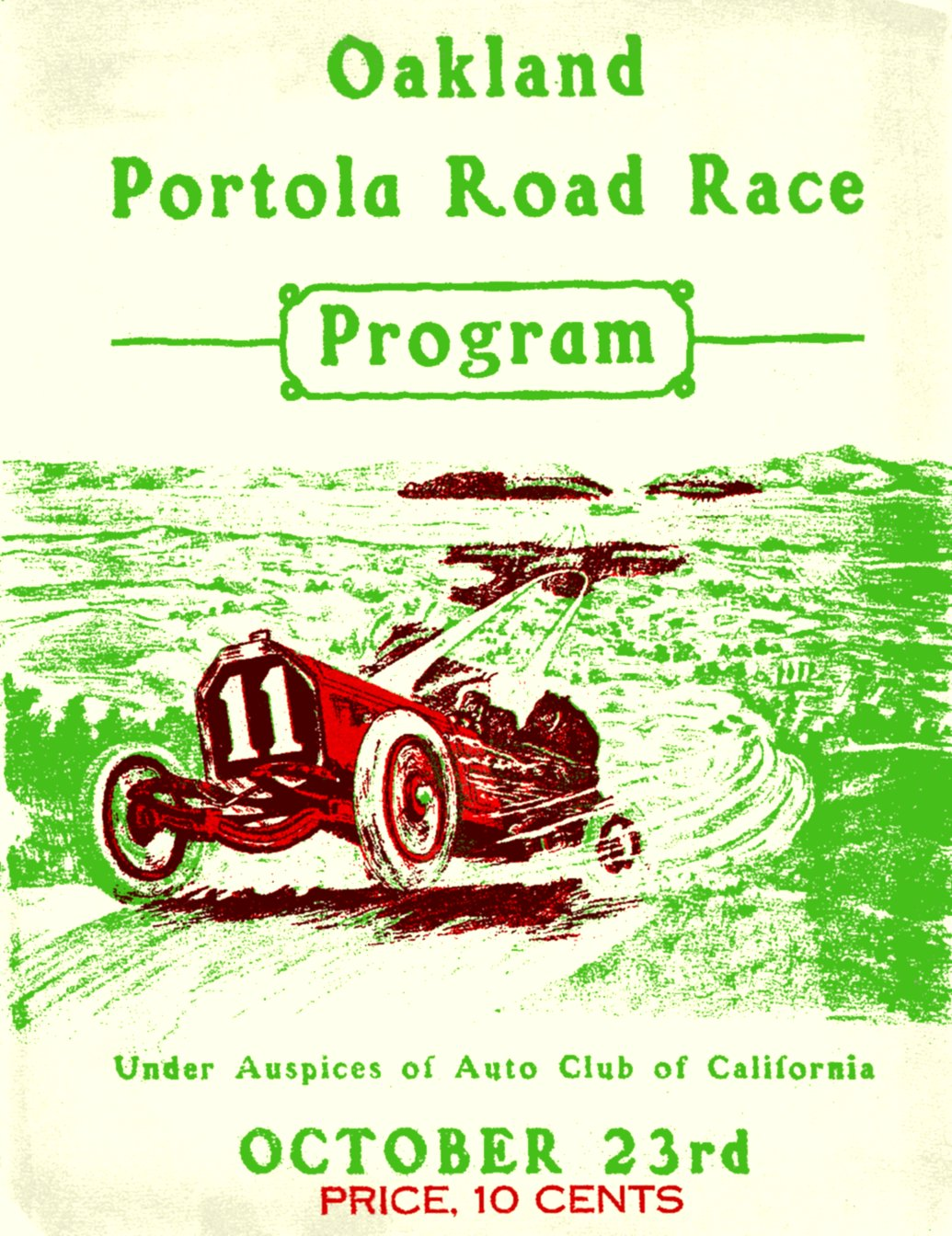
1909 race program

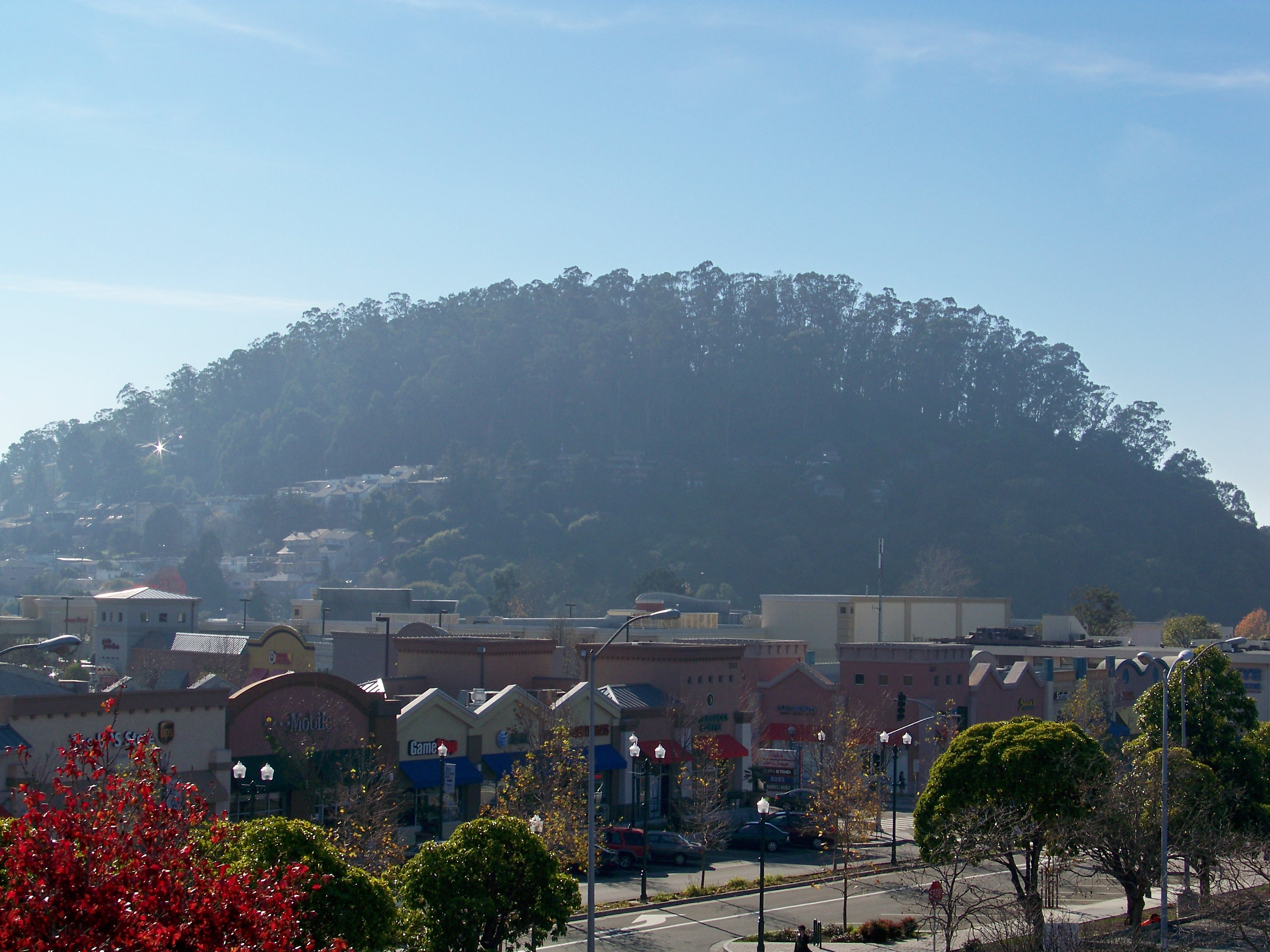
Albany Hill in Albany

• The first Portola Road Race (pictured, left) is run through Melrose in Oakland, San Leandro and Hayward, with at least 250,000 attending
• Albany (Albany Hill pictured, right) is incorporated in Alameda County
• Fort Ross State Historic Park is established in Sonoma County to protect Fort Ross, founded in 1812 as the southernmost point in the Russian colonization of the Americas

- The C. H. Brown Theater opens in the Mission District, San Francisco
- Samuel Merritt College is founded in Oakland as a hospital school of nursing
- San Francisco Law School is founded
- The neighborhood of Thousand Oaks, a refugee camp from the 1906 San Francisco earthquake adjacent to Albany and Berkeley, is first subdivided
- The Richmond Police Department is founded
1910

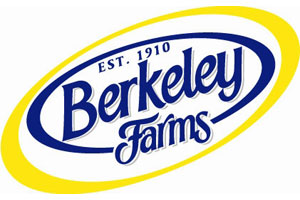
current Berkeley Farms logo

- John Sabatte opens the South Berkeley Creamery (current logo pictured), selling milk from local farmers in Alameda and Contra Costa counties (including "farms in Berkeley?") (sound clip shown, simulating radio ad for company)

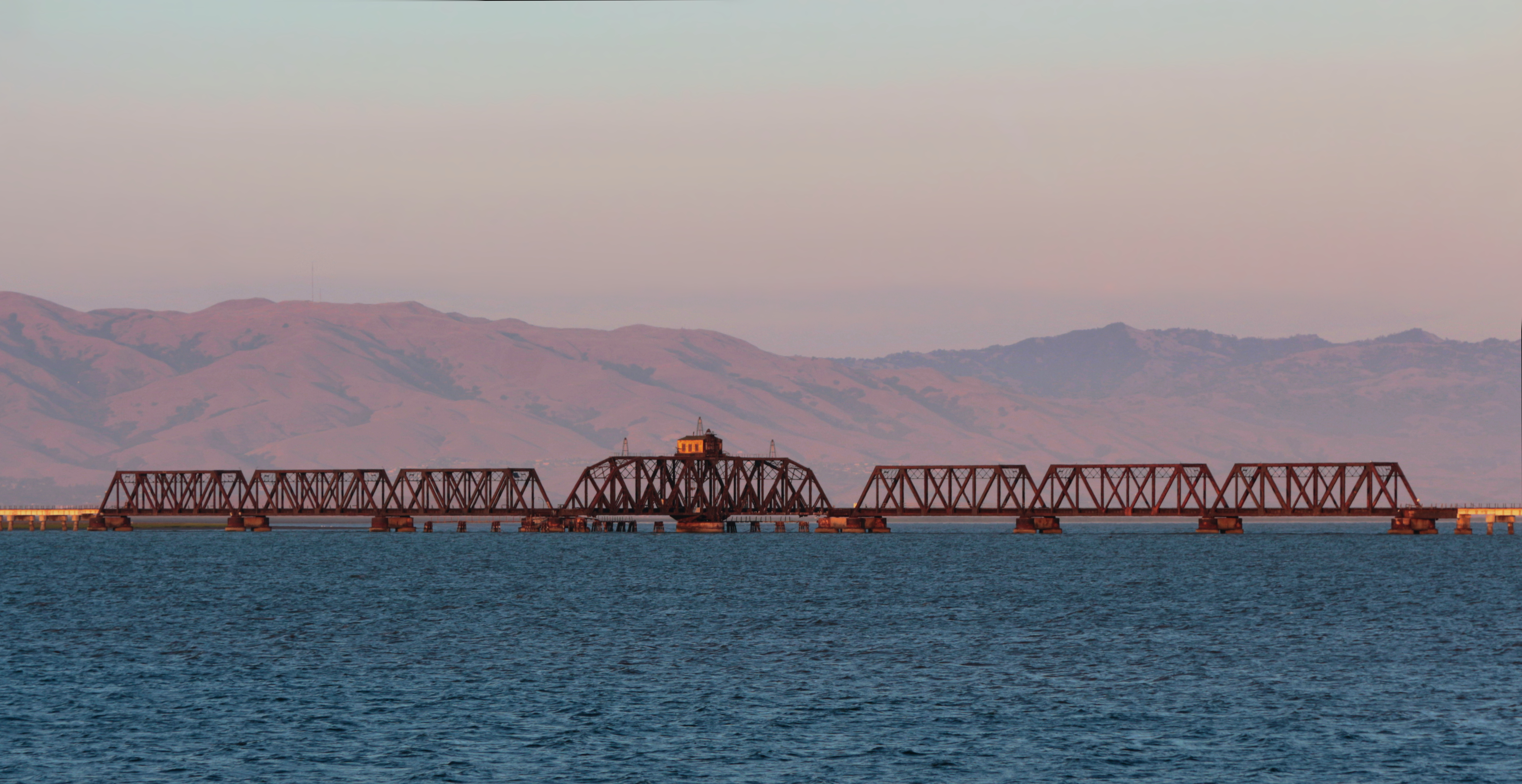
The Dumbarton Rail Bridge in 2021

- The Southern Pacific railroad company completes the Dumbarton Rail Bridge, the first bridge crossing San Francisco Bay. The bridge is inaugurated on September 12, 1910.
- Hillsborough is incorporated in San Mateo County on May 5
1911

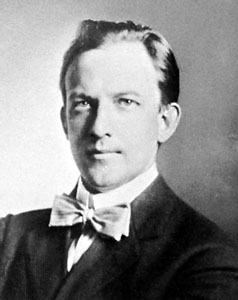
Henry Hadley

- The San Francisco Symphony, conducted by Henry Kimball Hadley (pictured), is founded
- Italian immigrant Ambrogio Soracco opens Liguria Bakery in San Francisco
- Daly City is incorporated in San Mateo County
1912

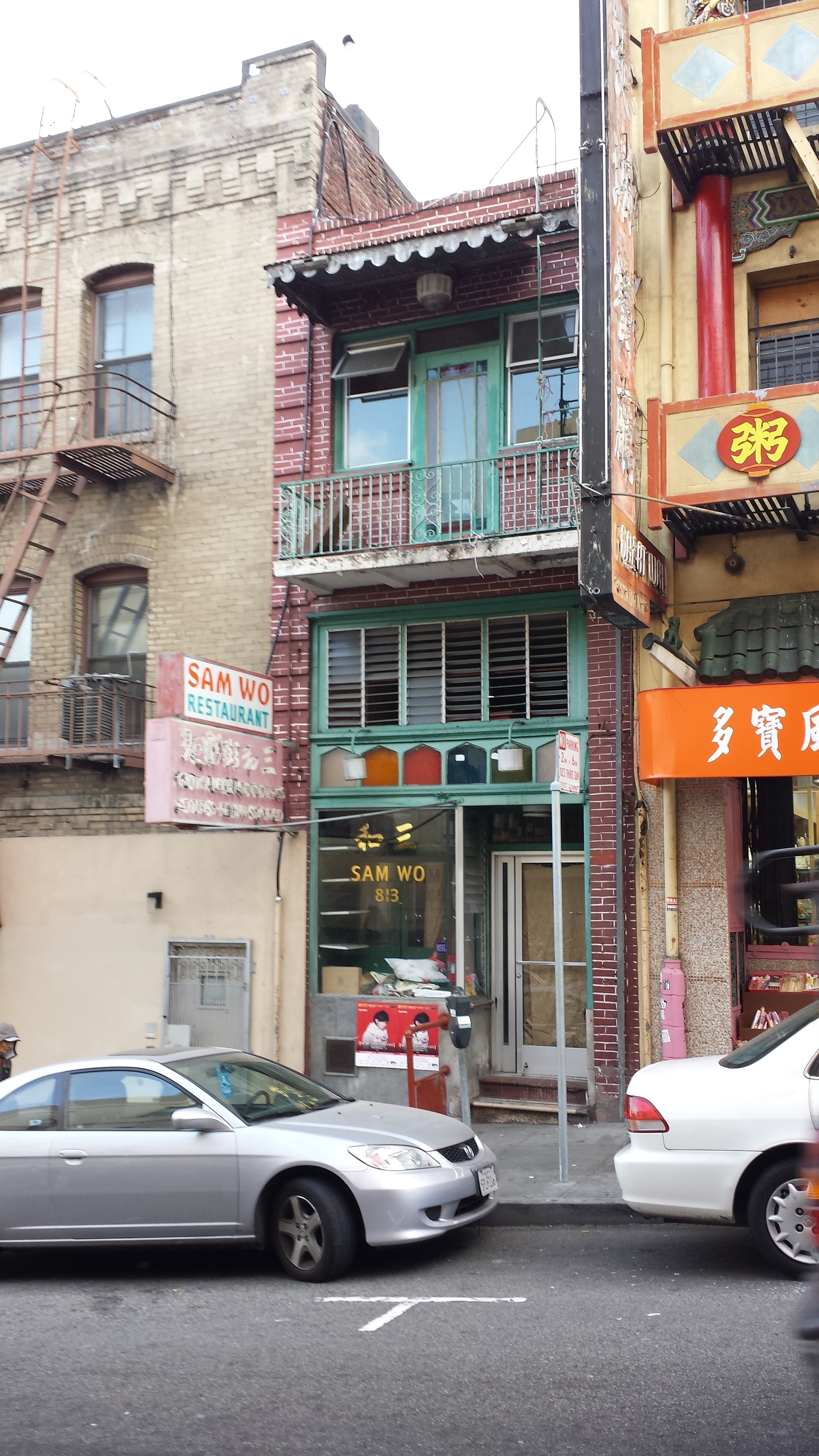
Sam Wo (closed, 2013)

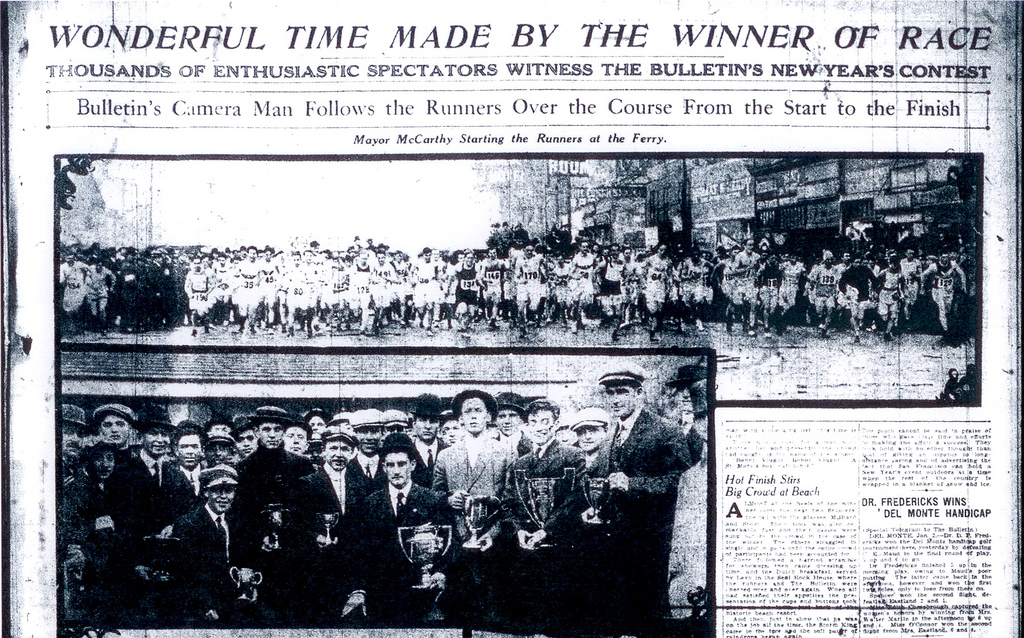
Newspaper account of the first race in 1912

• The Bay to Breakers (news headline on race pictured, right) is run in San Francisco for the first time
• Chinese restaurant Sam Wo (pictured, left. translation: "Three Harmonies Porridge and Noodles") in San Francisco's Chinatown opens
• Sunnyvale in Santa Clara County is incorporated
• The California Society of Etchers is founded in San Francisco
• Essanay Studios opens the Essanay-West studio in Niles, at the foot of Niles Canyon

1913

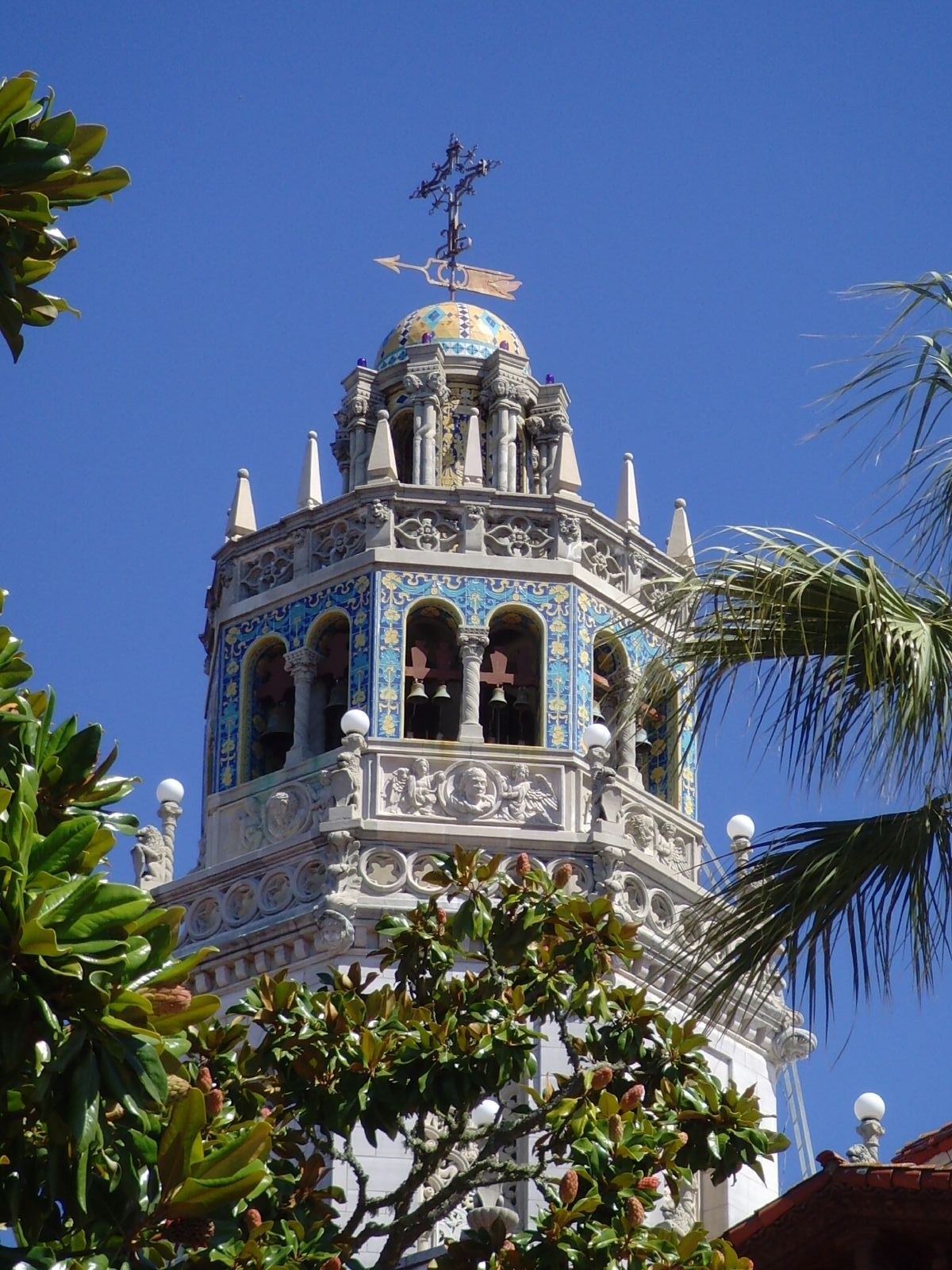
Hearst Castle detail, with faience tiles from California Faience

- Chauncey Thomas opens The Tile Shop on San Pablo Avenue in Berkeley to make and sell faience tiles (Hearst Castle tower, decorated with tiles from California Faience, pictured)
- Dewing Park in Contra Costa County is renamed Saranap after the local inter-urban commuter rail system developer's mother, Sara Napthaly
- John Swett, former Superintendent of the San Francisco Public Schools, and "Father of the California public school", dies
1914

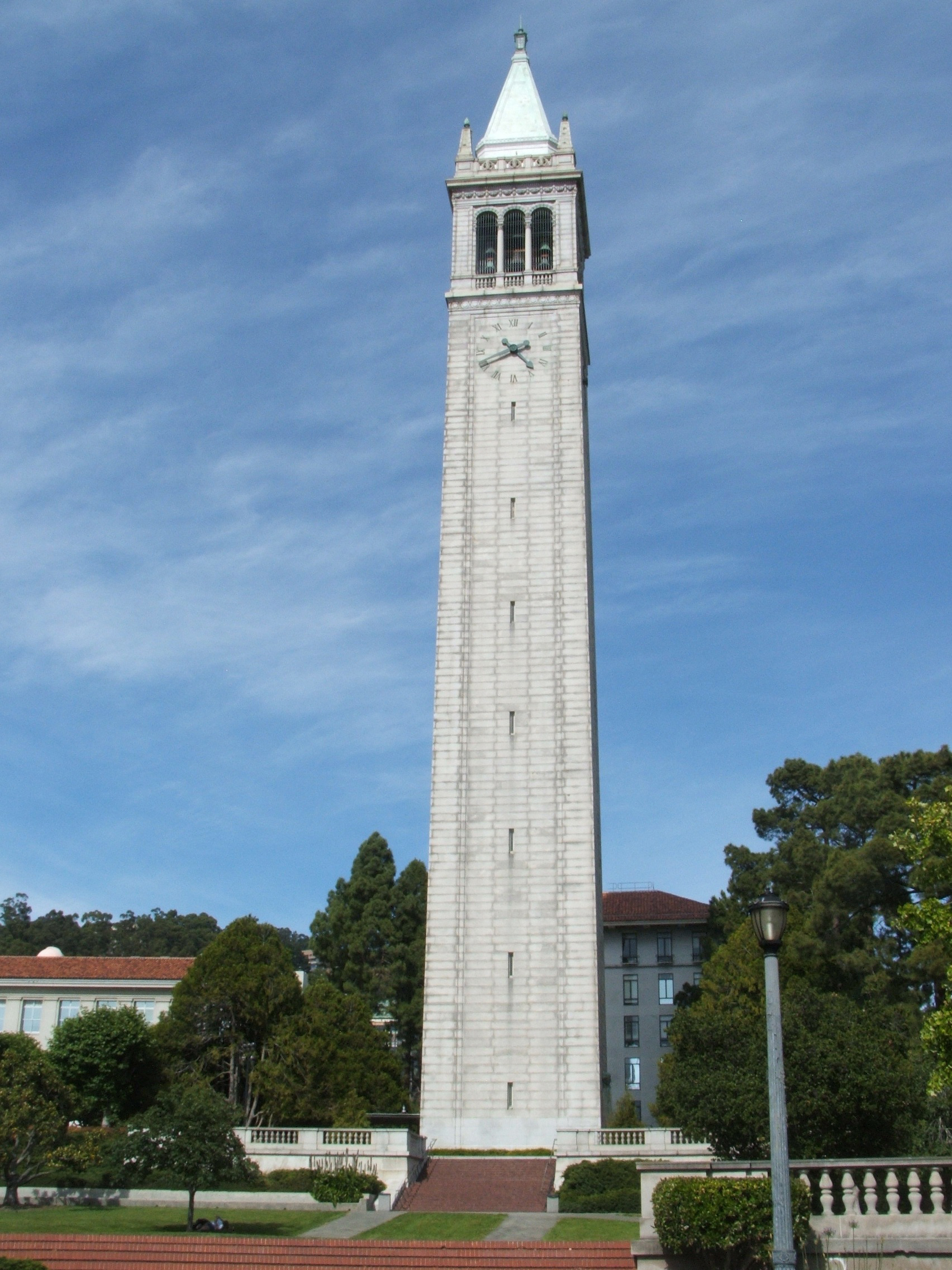
Sather Tower

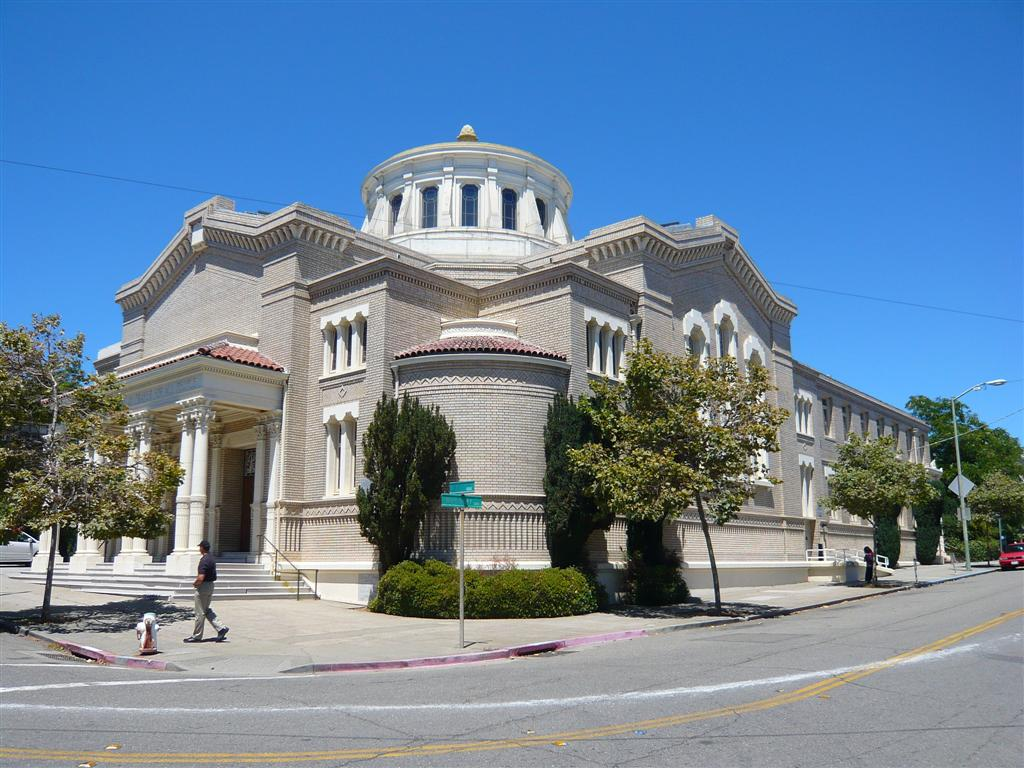
Temple Sinai

• Sather Tower (pictured, left), a campanile at the University of California, Berkeley is completed
• Temple Sinai (pictured, right) in Oakland is completed
• The Baby Hospital Association (organized September 1912), and the Baby Hospital Association of Alameda County (organized September 1913), establish The Children's Hospital of the East Bay in Oakland

1915

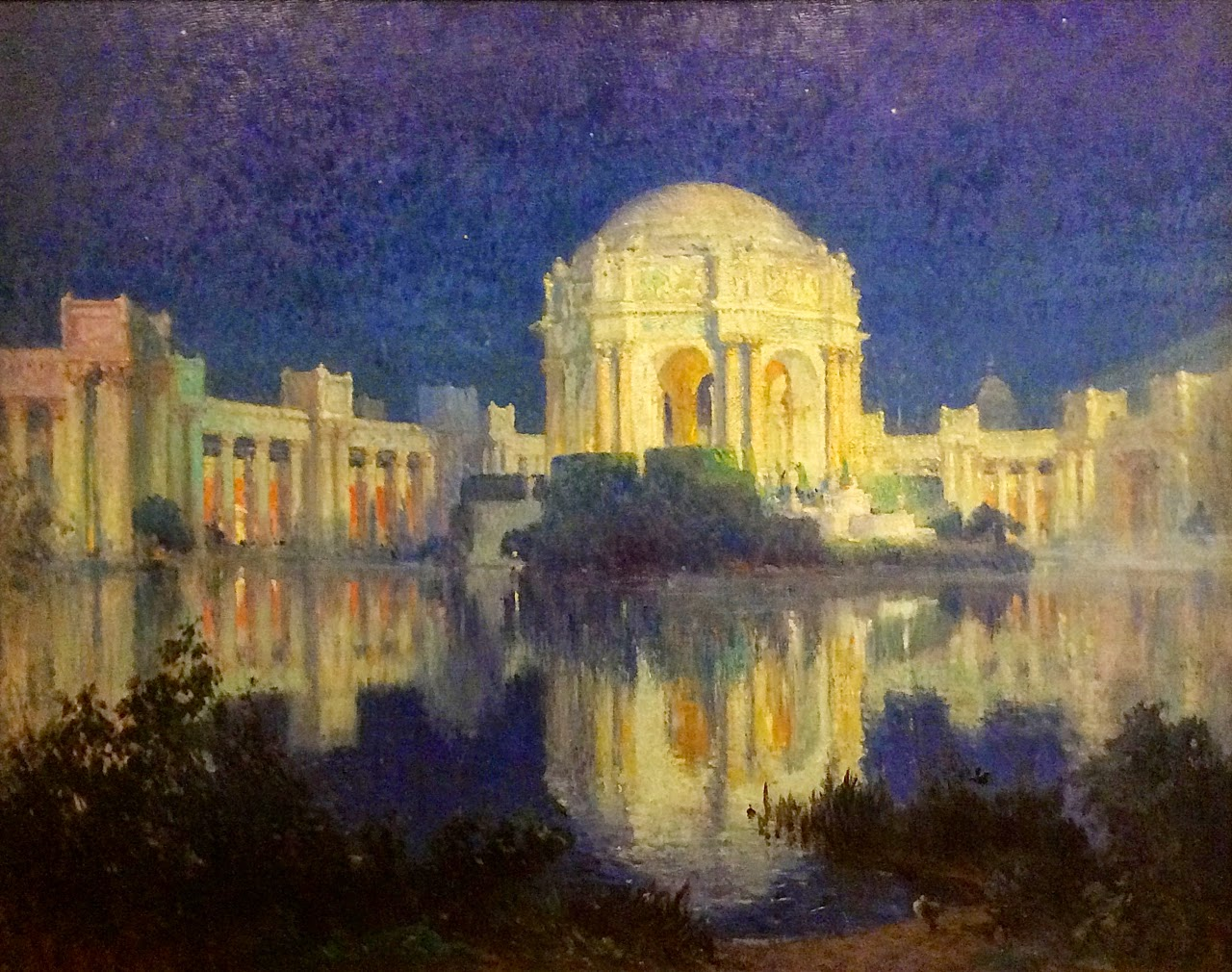
Palace of Fine Arts

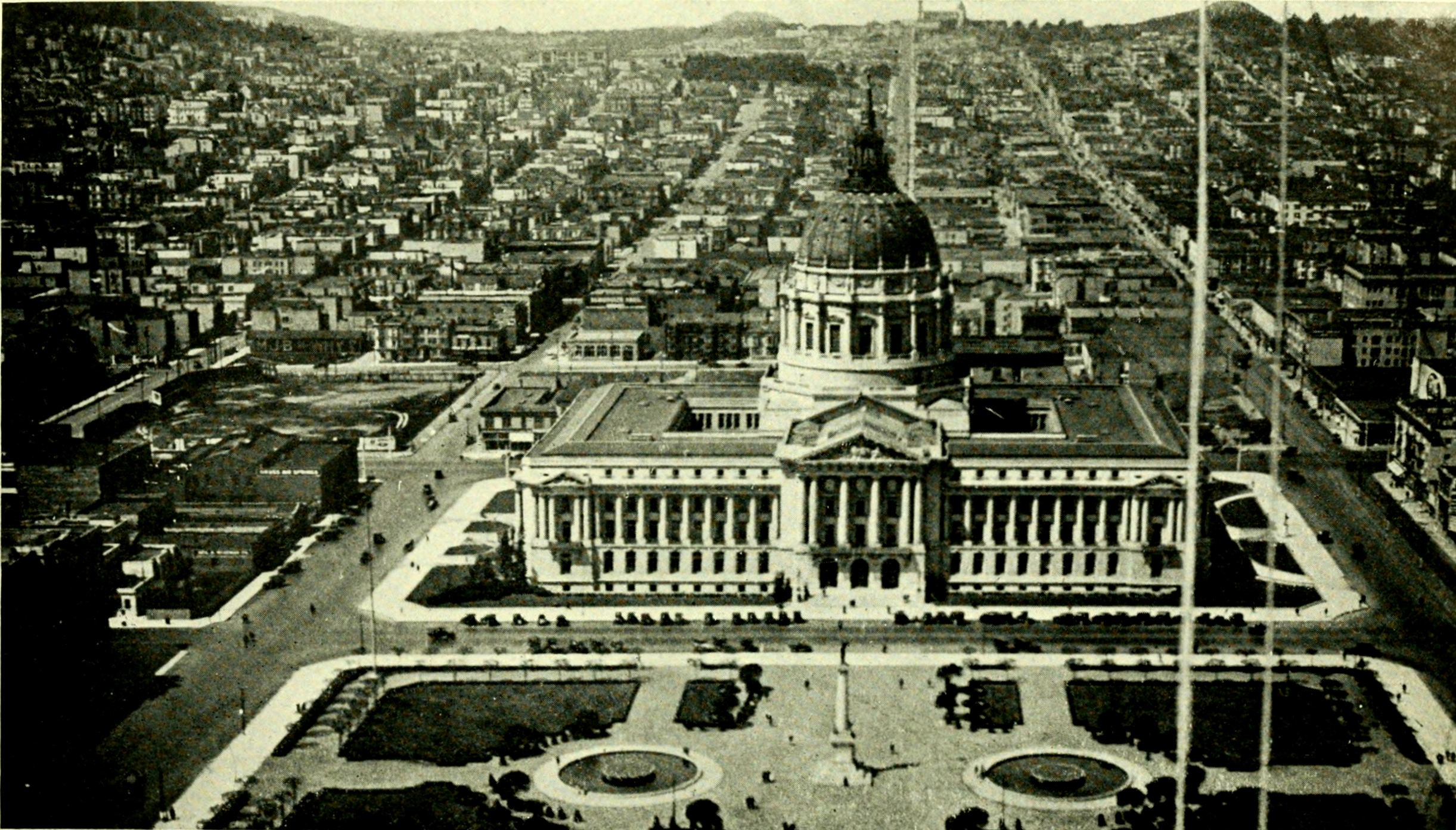
City Hall in 1921

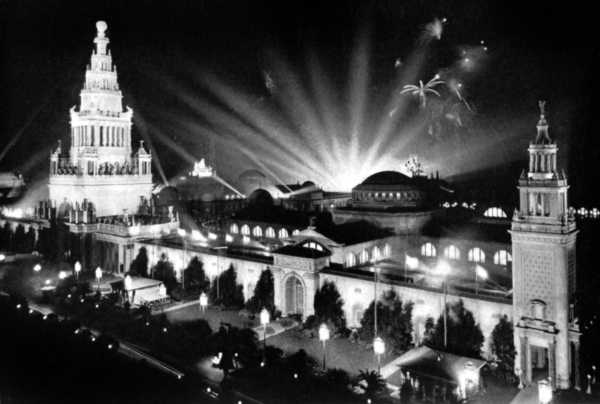
Pavilion with the Tower of Jewels, left

• The new Beaux-Arts style San Francisco City Hall (pictured, right) opens at the Civic Center, San Francisco
• The Panama–Pacific International Exposition is held in San Francisco, to celebrate the completion of the Panama Canal. It features the Palace of Fine Arts (pictured, left), the Tower of Jewels (pictured, right), and The San Francisco Civic Auditorium. Laura Ingalls Wilder writes about the exposition during her visit to the city that year.

1916

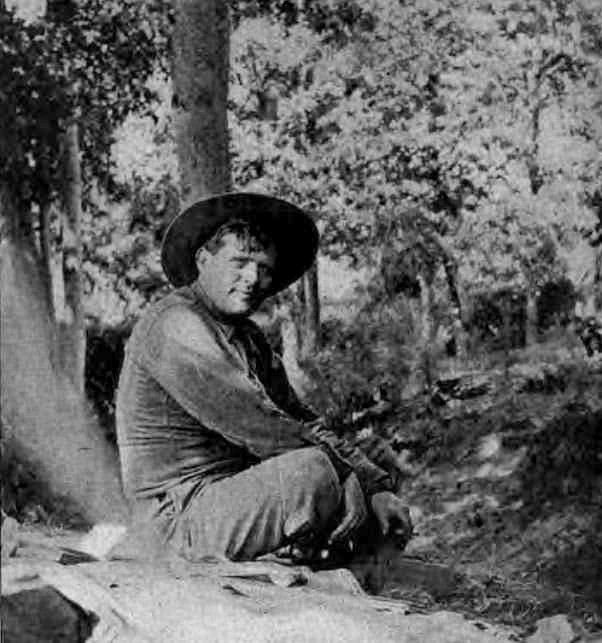
Jack London in 1914

- During a parade on Preparedness Day, prior to entry into World War I, a suitcase bomb detonates, killing ten and wounding forty, the worst such attack in San Francisco's history
- Buena Vista Cafe opens in San Francisco on the first floor of a boardinghouse converted into a saloon
- Thomaso Castagnola opens the first crab stand on Fisherman's Wharf in San Francisco, selling fresh crab to passersby
- Writer Jack London (pictured) dies at his ranch on the eastern slope of Sonoma Mountain
- General Motors Oakland Assembly opens
- Fageol Motors is founded in Oakland
- University of California, Berkeley establishes the first program in the US for the study of criminal justice, headed by Berkeley police chief August Vollmer
1917

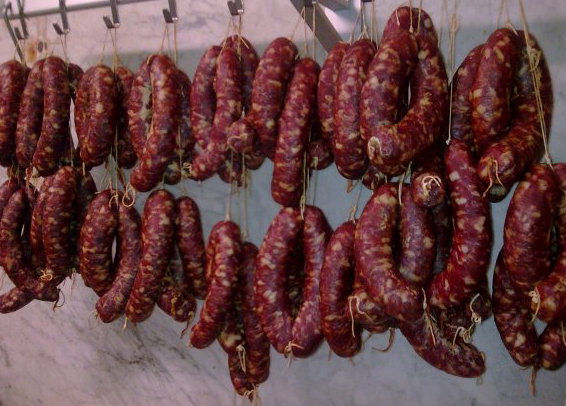
Italian style Cotto Salame

- The San Francisco Sausage Company is established by Italian immigrants Peter Domenici and Enrico Parducci
- Neptune Beach opens in Alameda with private picnic areas, barbecue pits, a clubhouse for dancing, and vacation cottages
- El Cerrito in Contra Costa County is incorporated
- During World War I, a major explosion of barges loaded with munitions at Mare Island Naval Shipyard killes 6 people, wounds another 31, and destroys some port facilities.
1918

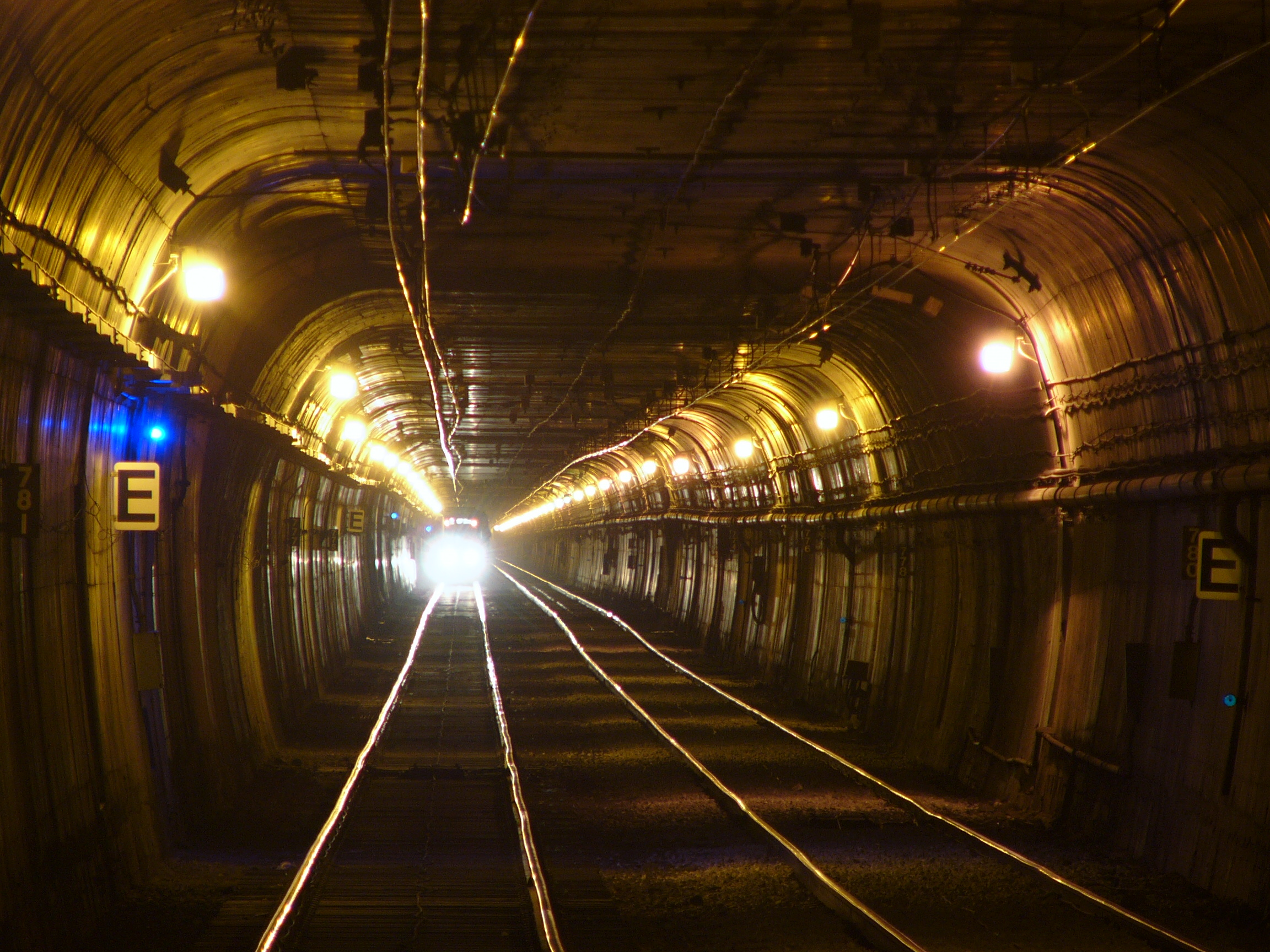
Twin Peaks Tunnell

- The 2.27-mile (3.65 km)-long Twin Peaks Tunnel (pictured) opens to streetcar service under Twin Peaks, San Francisco
- Santa Rosa Junior College is established
- Historian and ethnologist Hubert Howe Bancroft dies in Walnut Creek
1919

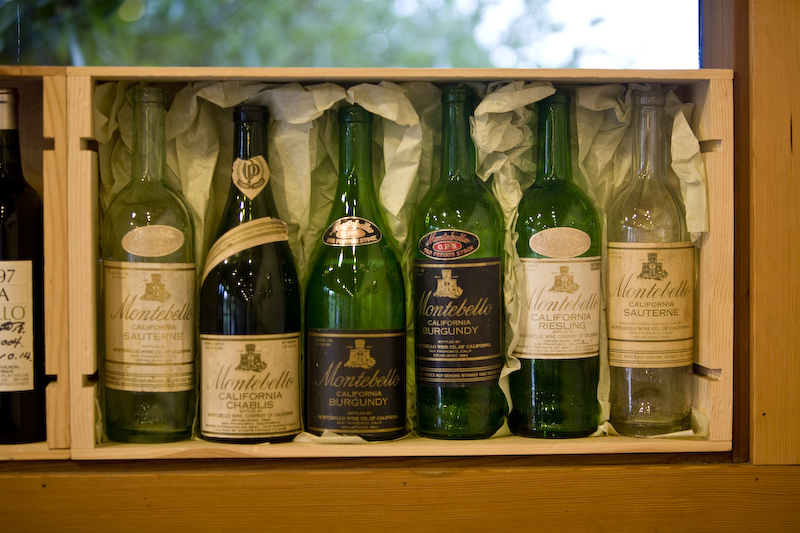
Early vintages from Wine Country

- Wines & Vines, a journal devoted to the North American wine business (early Wine Country vintages pictured), begins publishing in Marin County
- Edward Howard Duncan Jr. is born in Oakland
- The 18th Amendment results in Bay Area vineyards uprooted and cellars destroyed, with some vineyards and wineries converting to table grape or grape juice production, or providing churches with sacramental wine
1920

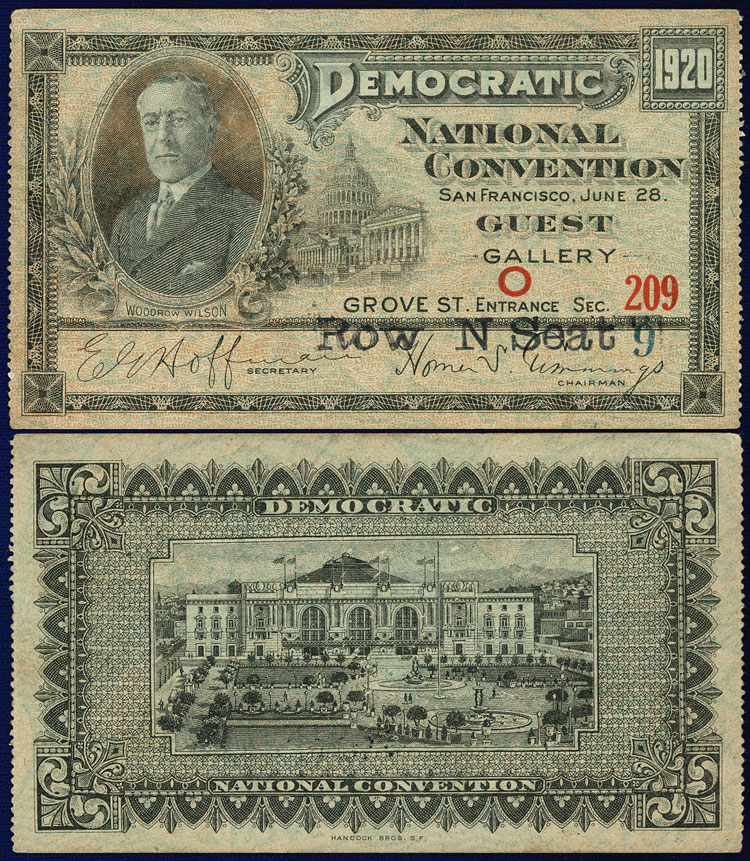
Democratic Convention guest pass

- The Democratic National Convention (guest pass pictured) is held at the San Francisco Civic Auditorium, with their platform supporting the League of Nations and women's suffrage
- Cooley LLP is founded in San Francisco by attorneys Arthur Cooley and Louis Crowley
- The Schlage lock company is founded in San Francisco by Walter Schlage
- The Solon and Schemmel Tile Company is founded in San Jose
1921

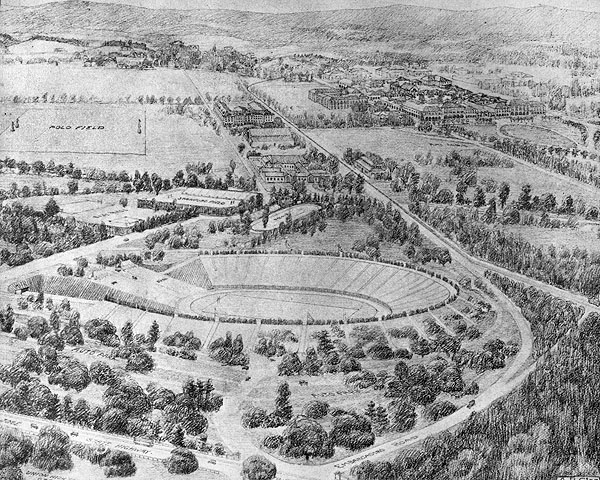
Stanford Stadium in 1921

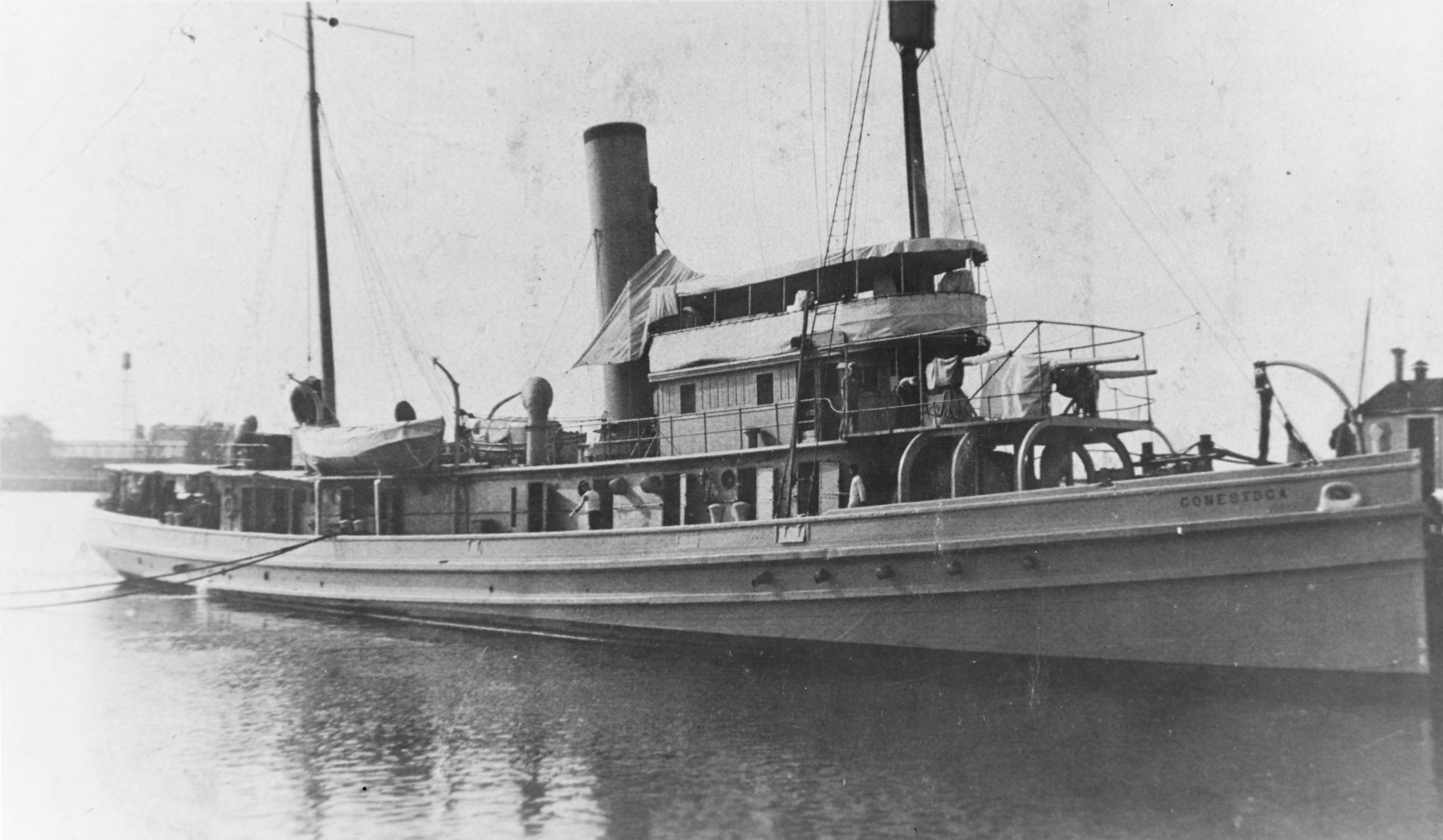
USS Conestoga

- San Jose engineer Charles Herrold, after experimenting with radio broadcasting since 1909, receives a commercial license under the callsign KQW
- KLX, owned by Oakland Tribune publisher Joseph R. Knowland, begins broadcasting out of Oakland
- San Jose Junior College is established
- The original Stanford Stadium (pictured) is completed on the Stanford University campus, as the home of the Stanford Cardinal football team
- The University of California Museum of Paleontology opens at the University of California, Berkeley, to hold fossils gathered during the 1860–1867 California Geological Survey
- The USS Conestoga (pictured) goes missing after leaving Mare Island
1922

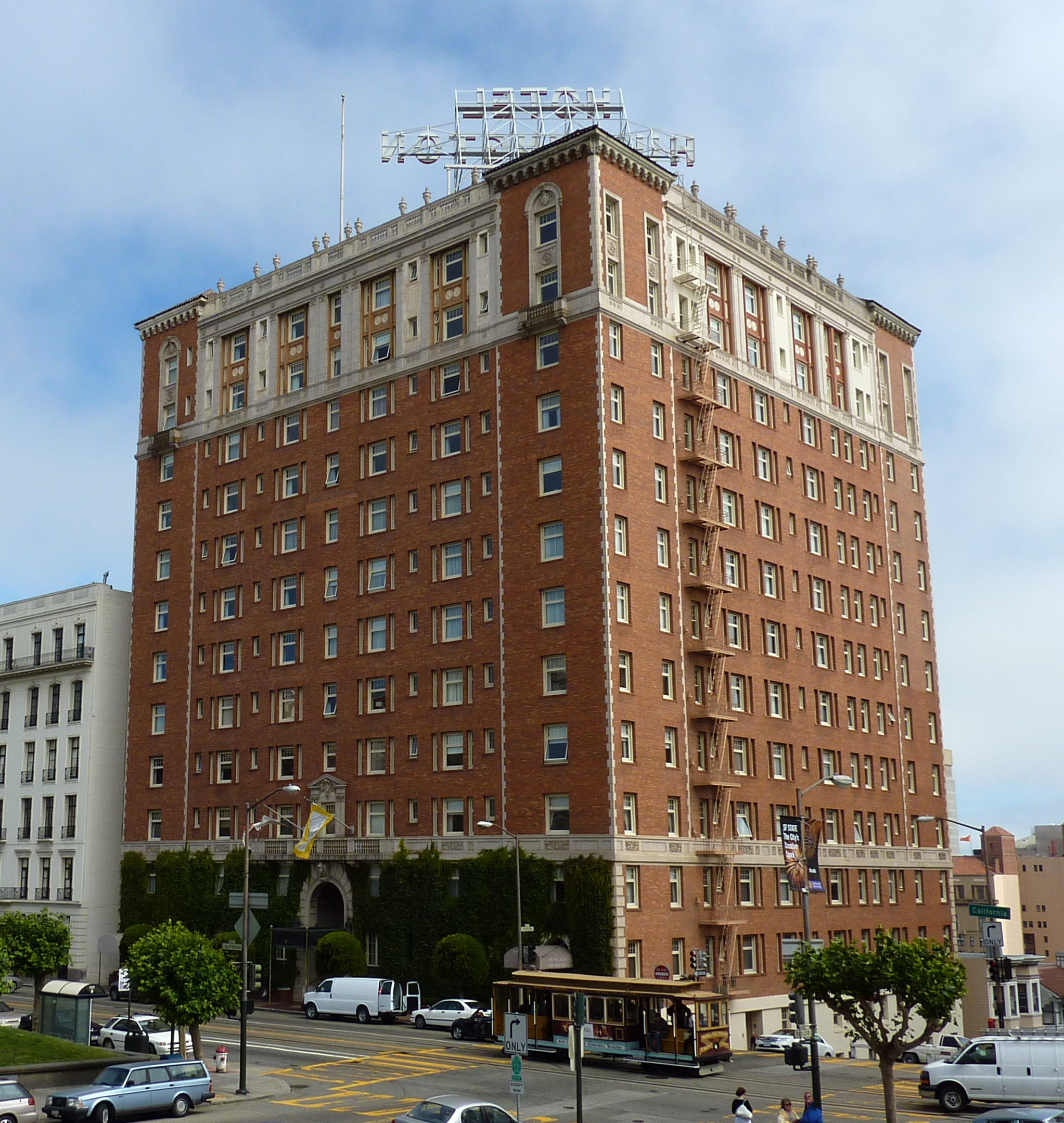
Huntington Hotel

- KPO, owned by the Hale Brothers department store and the San Francisco Chronicle, begins broadcasting out of San Francisco
- Naturalist Henry A. Snow establishes the Oakland Zoo
- San Mateo Junior College is founded
- Huntington Apartments in San Francisco (pictured), named after Collis Potter Huntington of the "Big Four", is completed
1923

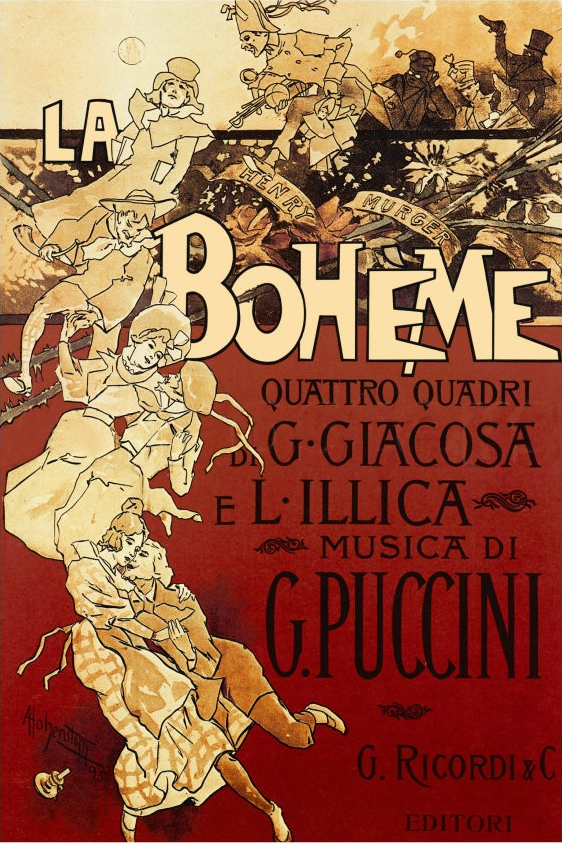
Original poster for La bohème

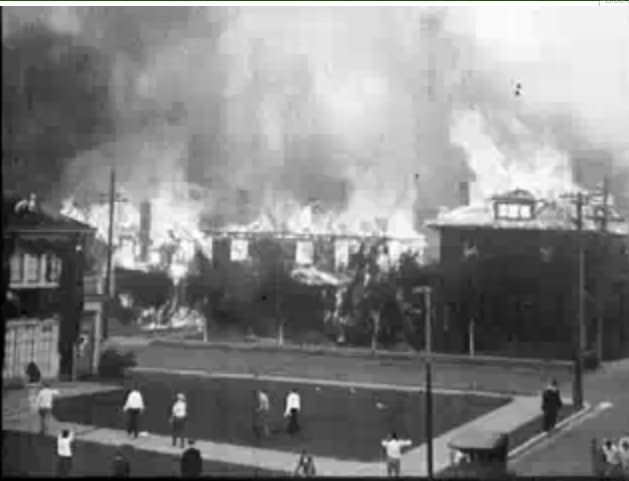
The Berkeley Fire

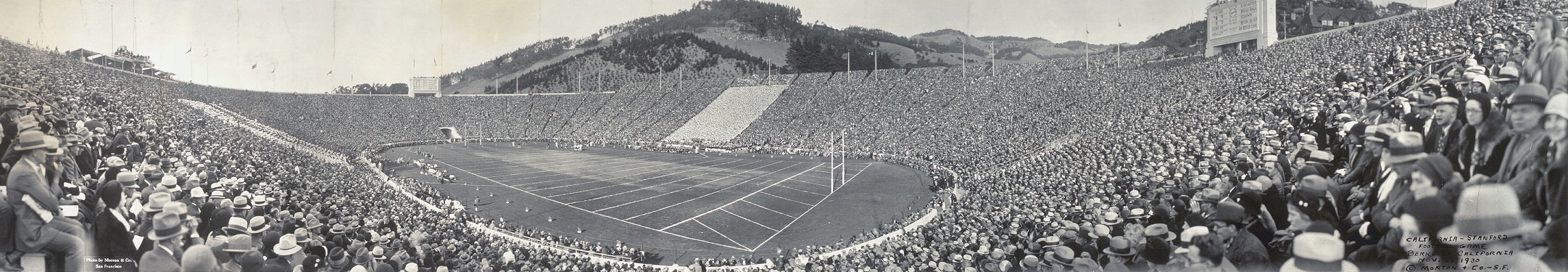
Memorial Stadium in 1930

• A large fire in Berkeley (pictured, right) consumes some 640 structures, before being extinguished by cool, humid afternoon air coming through the Golden Gate across the bay
• Atherton is incorporated in San Mateo County
• California Memorial Stadium (pictured, right) opens in Berkeley, as the home field for the California Golden Bears football team of the University of California, Berkeley
• The East Bay Municipal Utility District is formed to provide water and sewage treatment services to the East Bay
• The San Francisco Opera Ballet gives its first performance, of La bohème (pictured, left), with Queena Mario and Giovanni Martinelli, conducted by founder Gaetano Merola, at the San Francisco Civic Auditorium

1924

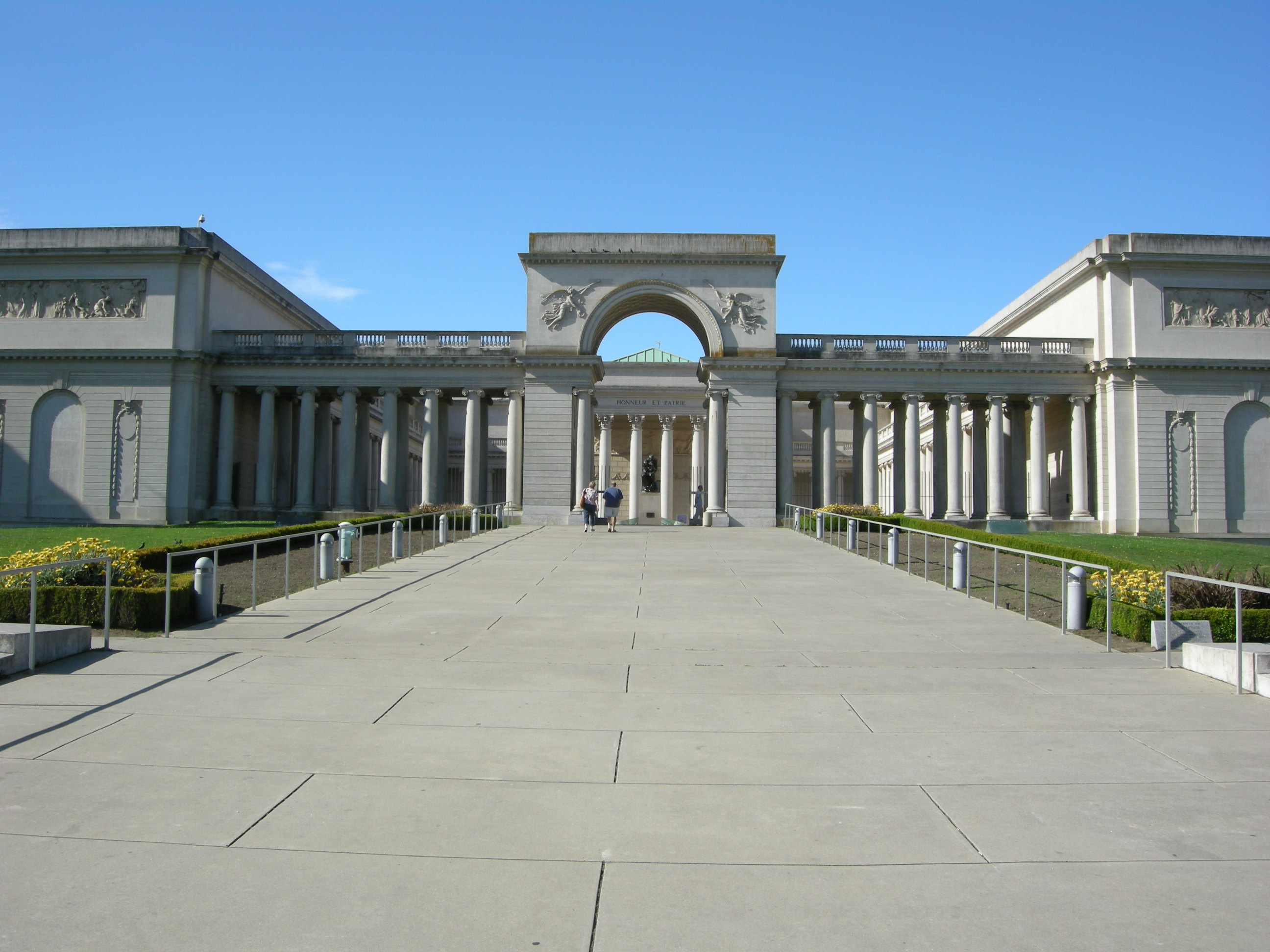
Legion of Honor

- The California Palace of the Legion of Honor in San Francisco (pictured), modeled after the Palais de la Légion d'Honneur in Paris, opens
- KGO Radio begins broadcasting from General Electric's Oakland electrical facility
- Lawndale is incorporated in San Mateo County, at the behest of the cemetery owners in the area, which had been established after San Francisco banned all cemeteries in 1900, and removed most existing ones from the city
- Congregation Beth Israel is established in Berkeley
- San Francisco is reported to have the highest average per capita income of any city in the world
1925

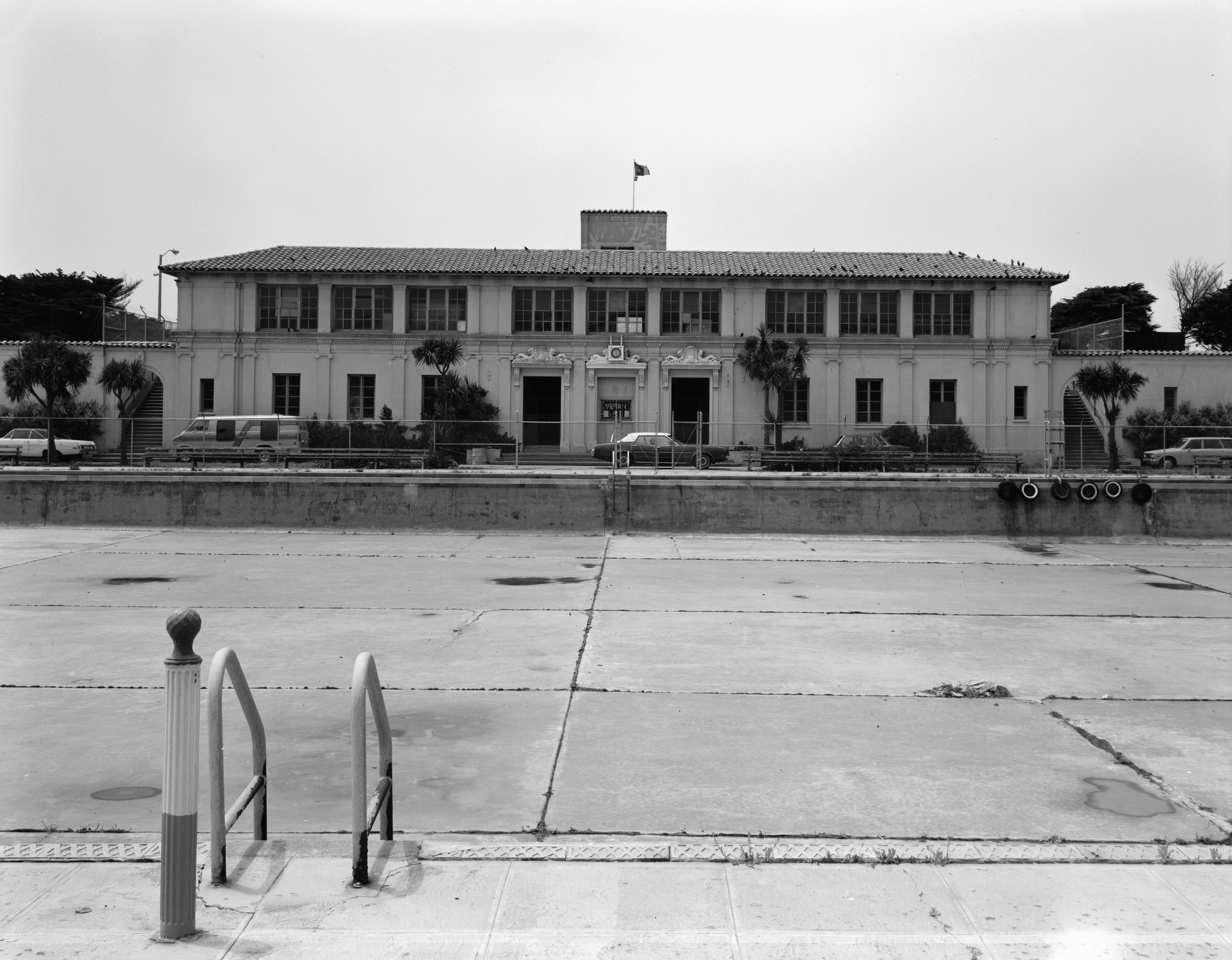
Fleischhacker Pool, defunct (1979)

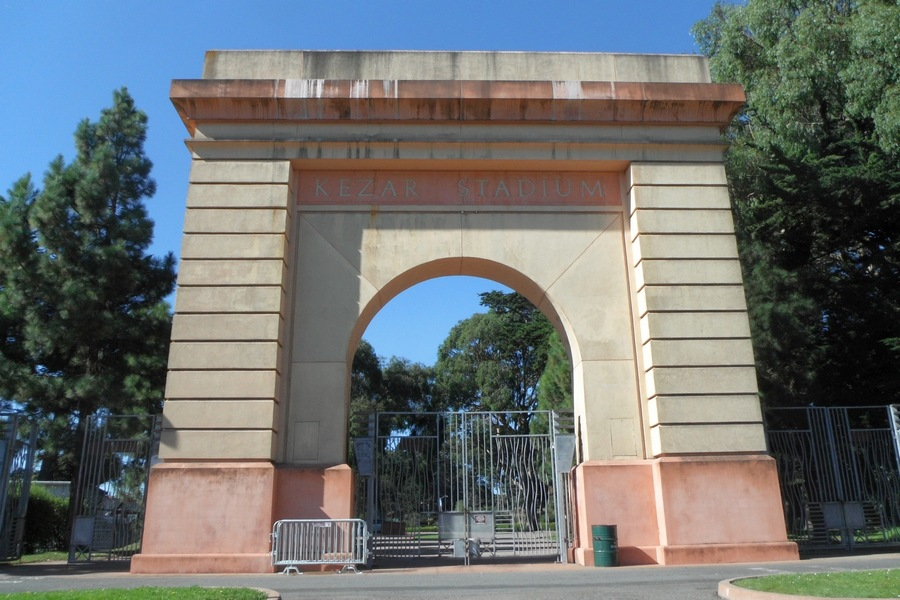
Replica of original Kezar Stadium entrance

• The heated, saltwater Fleishhacker Pool in San Francisco opens (pictured, left)
• The original Kezar Stadium in San Francisco opens (replica arch pictured, right)
• San Carlos is incorporated in San Mateo County
• The California Arts and Crafts Ainsley House is built in Campbell

1926

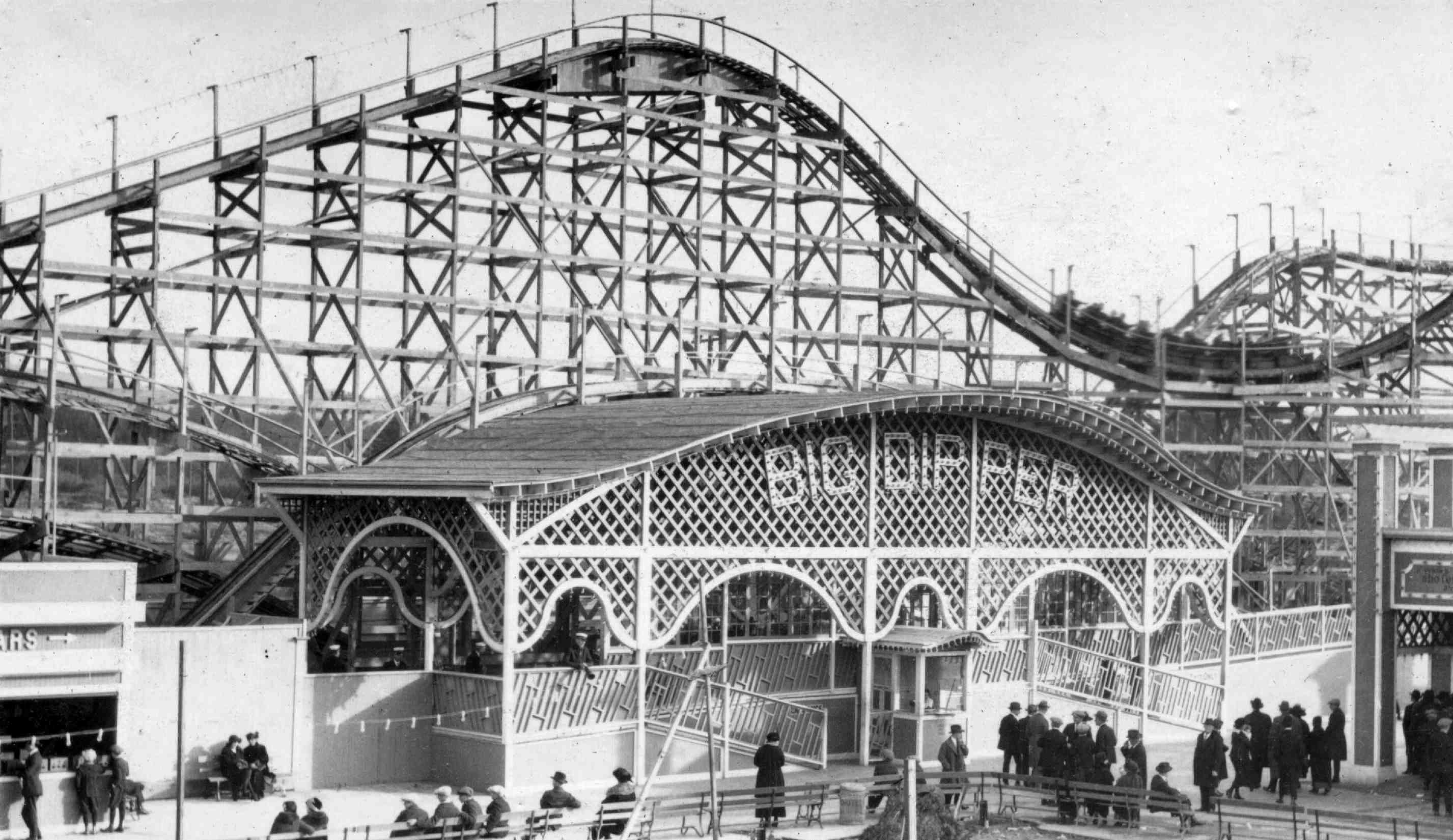
Big Dipper at Playland

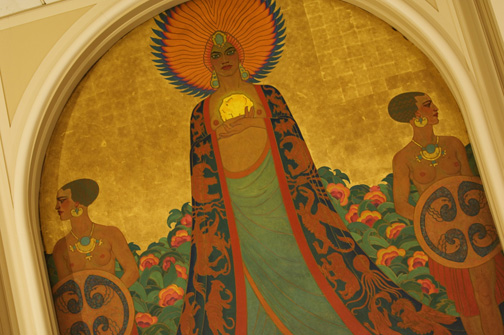
Mural detail from the Mark Hopkins

- George Whitney becomes general manager of a variously named complex of seaside attractions next to Ocean Beach in San Francisco, and christens it "Playland-at-the-Beach" (Big Dipper pictured)
- The law firm of Brobeck, Phleger & Harrison is founded
- Marin Junior College in Kentfield is founded
- The Leimert Bridge in Oakland, a cement and steel arch bridge spanning 357 feet and rising 117 feet above Sausal Creek, becomes the largest single-span bridge on the West Coast
- The Weeks and Day designed Mark Hopkins Hotel opens on Nob Hill in San Francisco (interior mural pictured)
1927

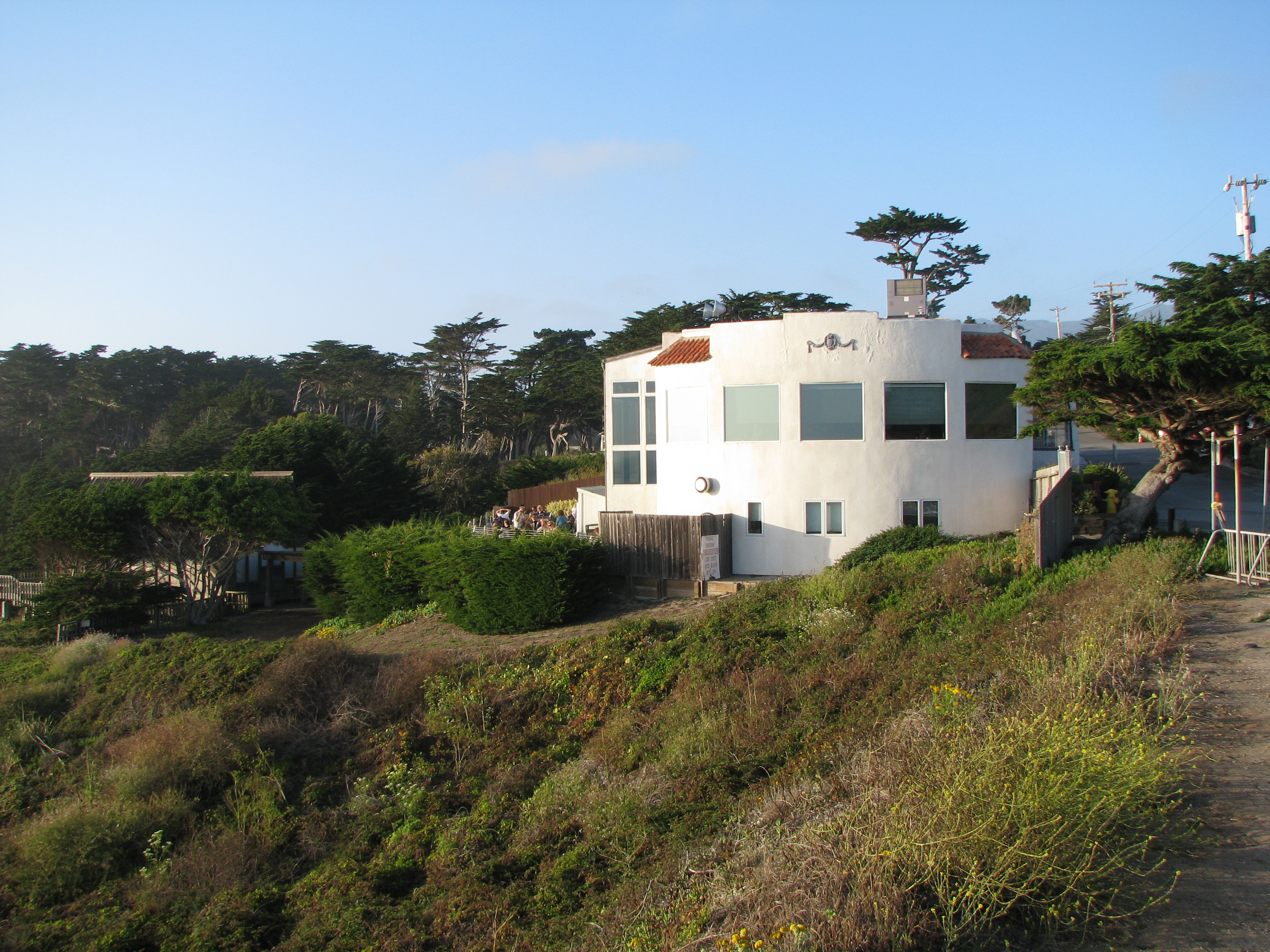
Moss Beach Distillery today

- During Prohibition, Frank Torres builds Frank's Place (pictured) as a speakeasy and clandestine liquor smuggling center on the cliffs above Moss Beach in San Mateo County
- Governor C. C. Young signs the State Bar Act into law, establishing the State Bar of California, which begins operating out of San Francisco
- Menlo Park in San Mateo County is incorporated
- 680 acres of land in Oakland are purchased to create an airport runway, which, when finished in time for the Dole Air Race, at 7,020 feet, becomes the longest in the world. Later in the year the airport is dedicated by Charles Lindbergh
1928

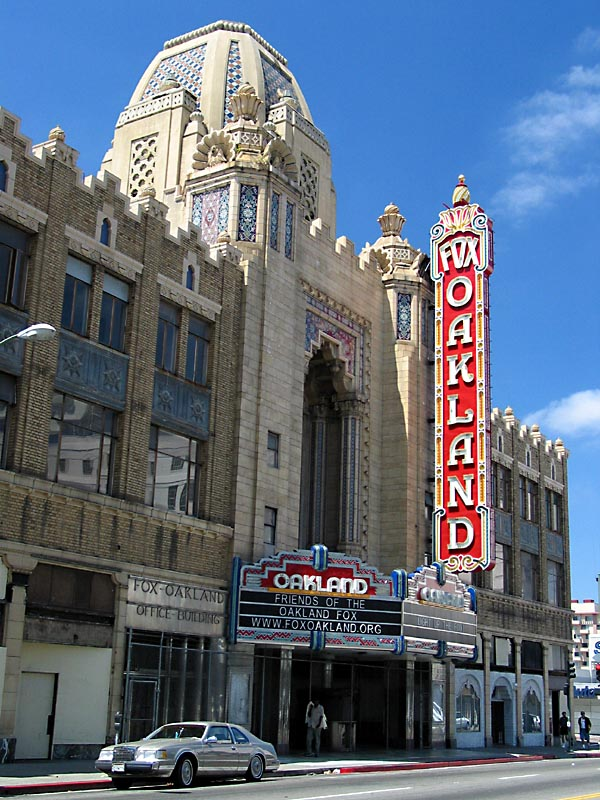
Fox Oakland Theatre

- The West Coast Oakland movie theatre (renamed theatre pictured), built by Weeks and Day, opens
- The Golden Gate Bridge and Highway District incorporates, its purpose to design, construct, and finance the Golden Gate Bridge
- Harvey Spencer Lewis of the Ancient Mystical Order Rosae Crucis presents his first exhibit of Egyptian antiquities, "The Rosicrucian Egyptian Oriental Museum", at their headquarters in San Jose
- Edy's Grand Ice Cream is established in Oakland
- The Emeryville Research Center of Shell Development Company is established in Emeryville by the Shell Oil Company
1929

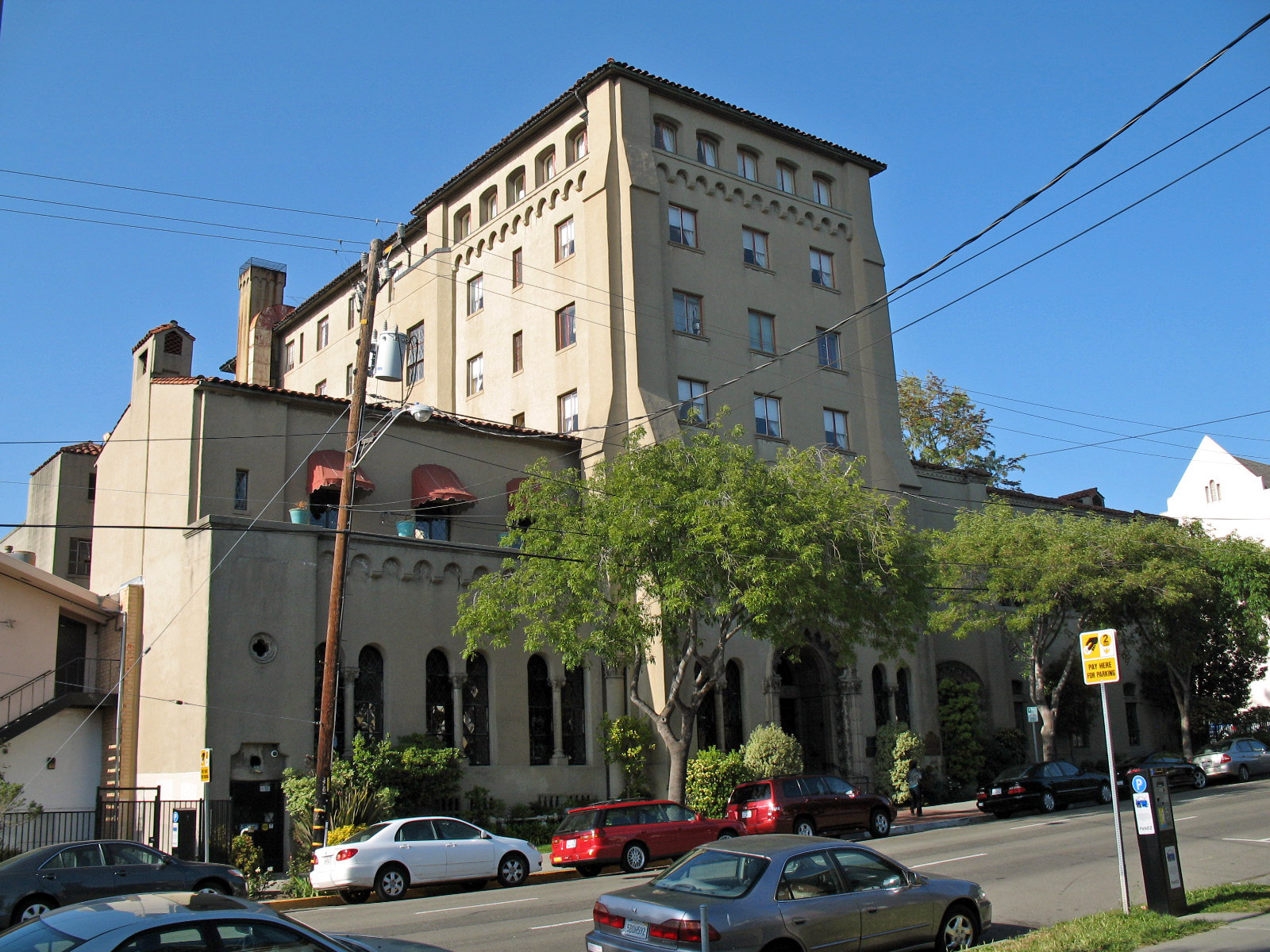
The Berkeley City Club building

- Fleishhacker Zoo opens in San Francisco
- Air Corps Station, San Rafael begins service
- The Golden West Savings and Loan Association in Oakland opens
- The Berkeley Women's City Club building (pictured) is built by Julia Morgan
1930

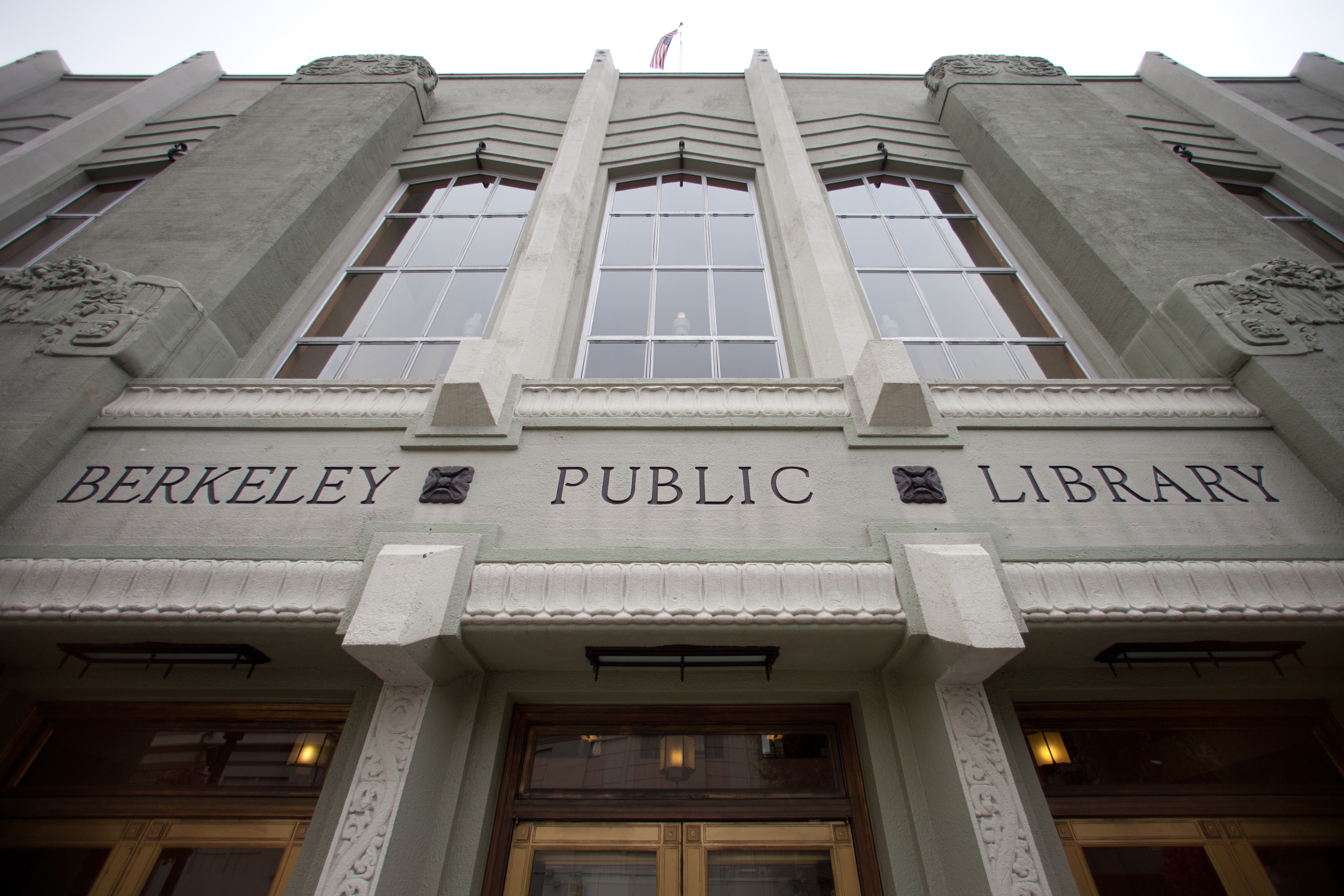
Berkeley Public Library building, downtown Berkeley

- The Art Deco downtown Berkeley Public Library building is completed (pictured)
- International House Berkeley is established by YMCA official Harry Edmonds
1931

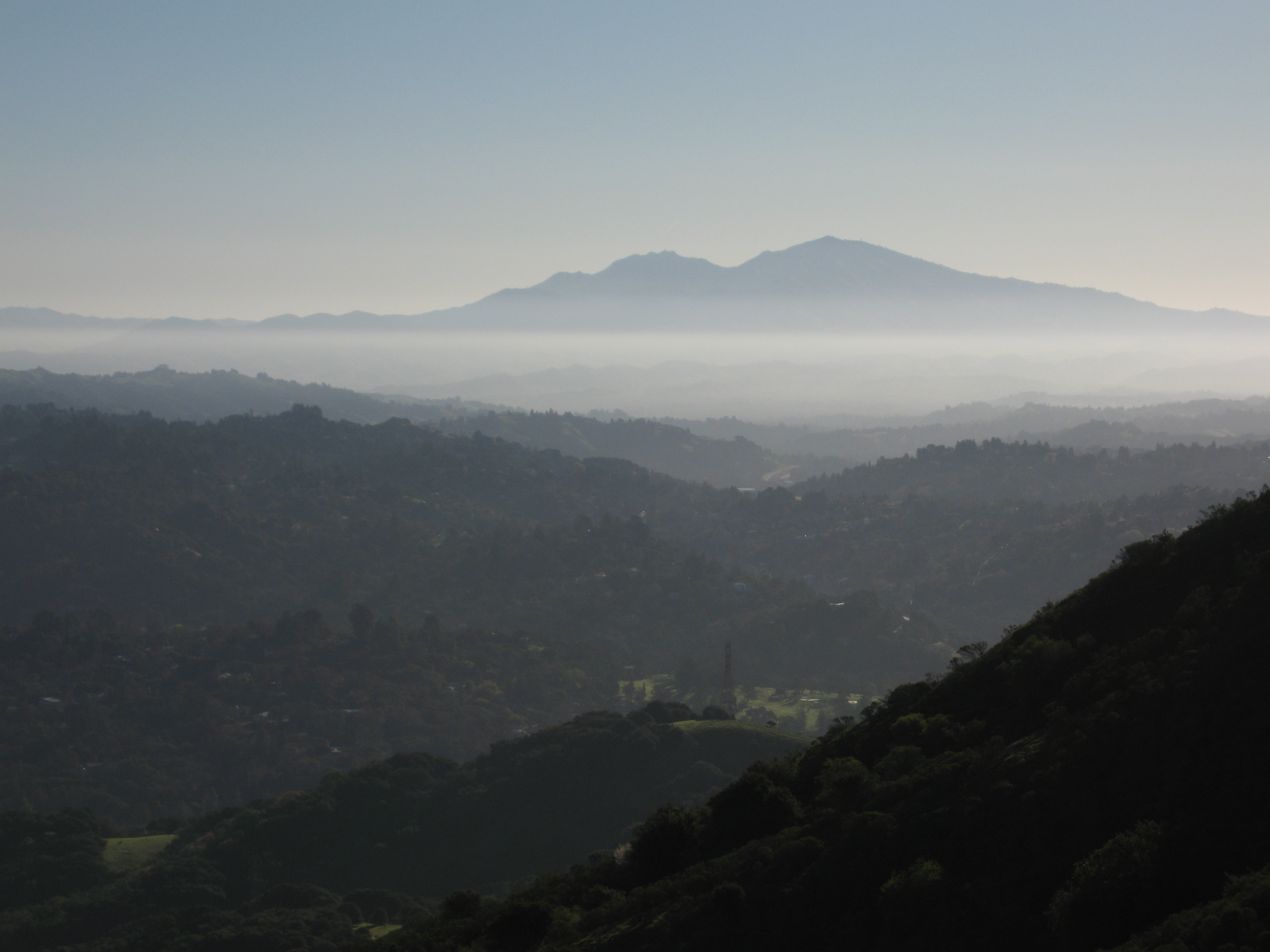
Mount Diablo

- Stern Grove in the Sunset District, San Francisco opens to the public
- The Bal Tabarin nightclub opens, the same year as the 365 Club opens at 365 Market Street, San Francisco
- The state of California acquires enough land to create a small state park around the peak of Mount Diablo (pictured) in Contra Costa County
- The Radiation Laboratory is established at University of California, Berkeley by Ernest O. Lawrence
1932

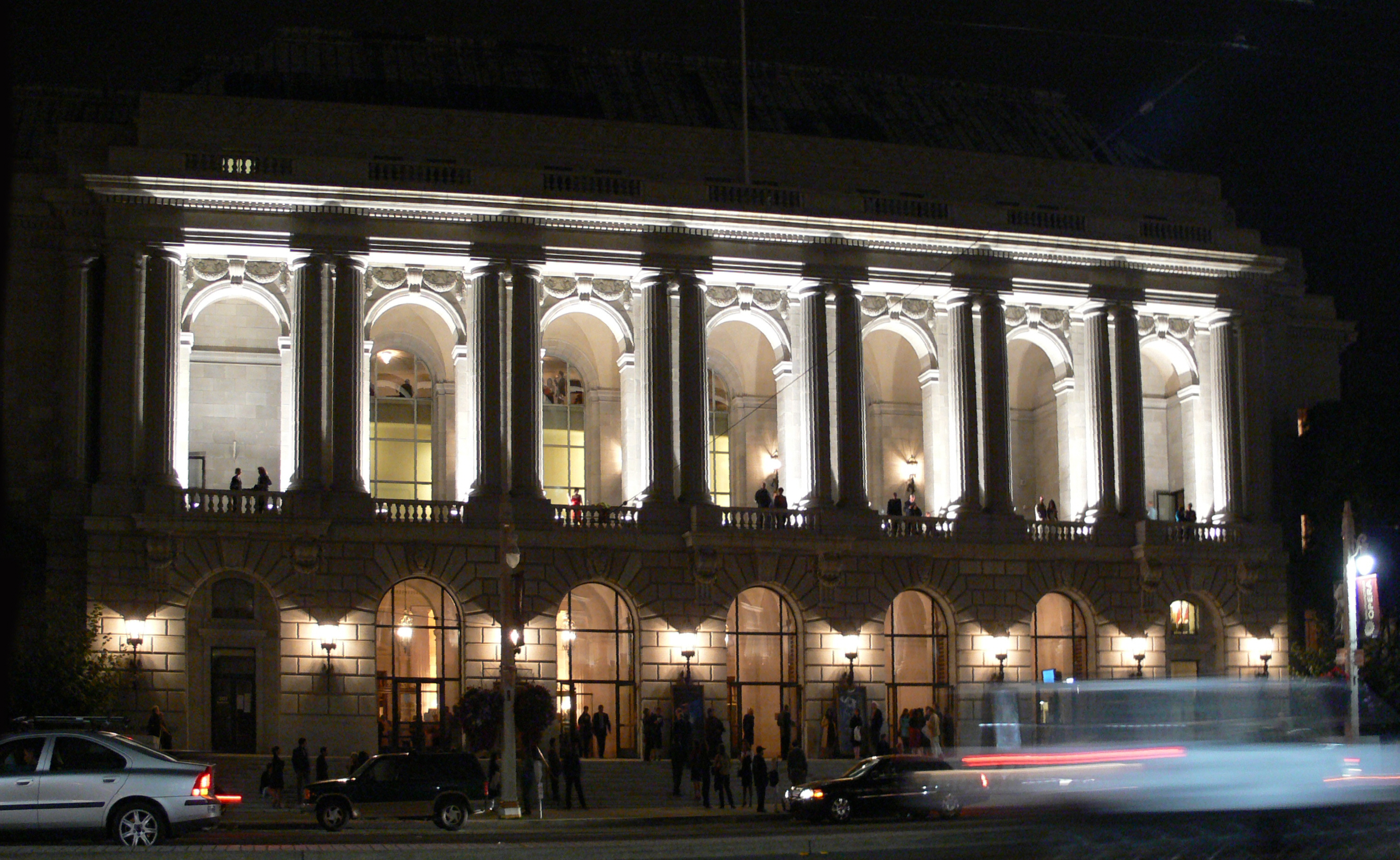
War Memorial Opera House

- The War Memorial Opera House (pictured) opens, becoming the new home of the San Francisco Opera
- Air Corps Station, San Rafael, begins formal development, and is renamed Hamilton Army Airfield
- The Art Deco Doelger Building is built as the offices for local developer Henry Doelger
1933

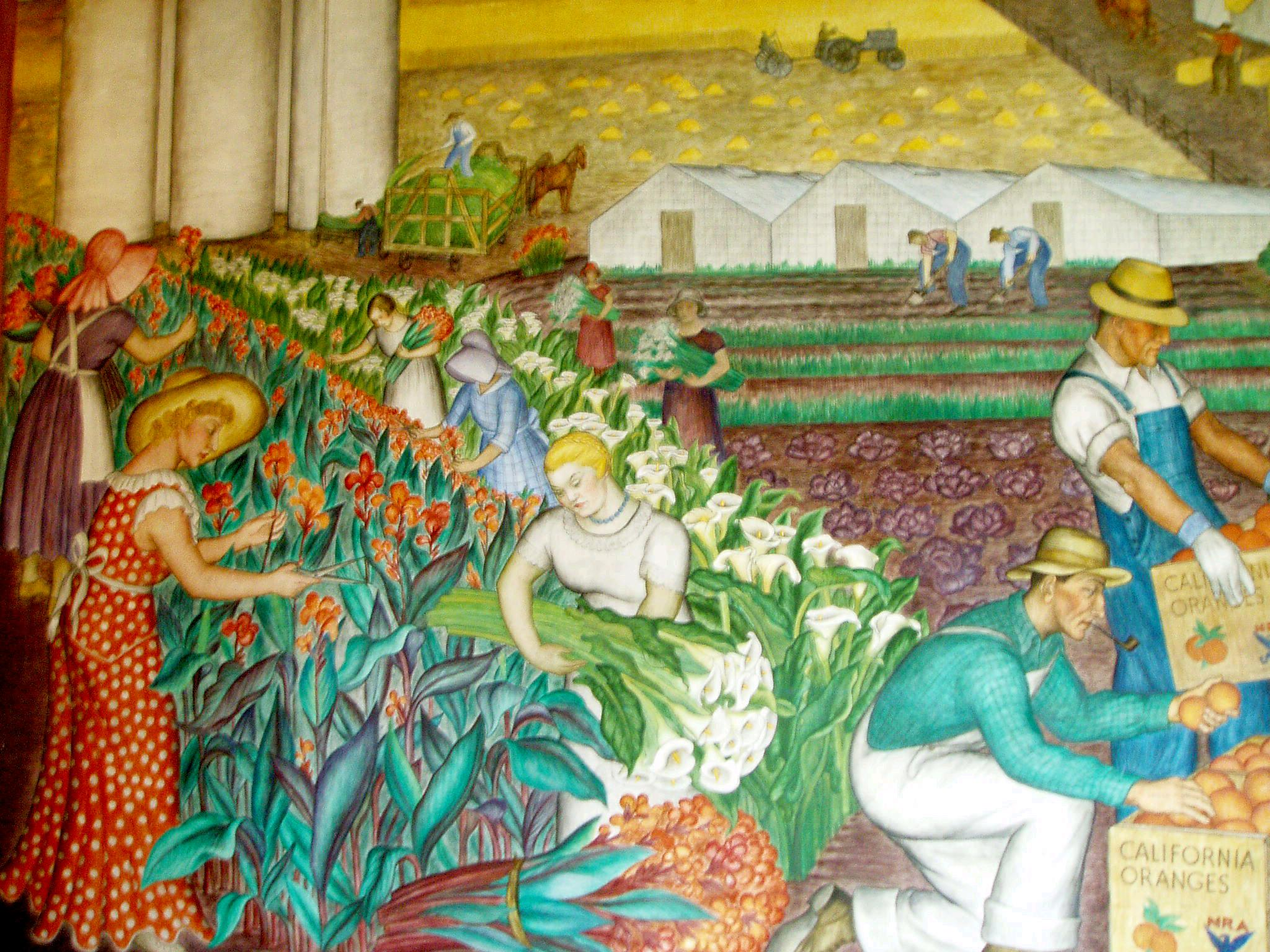
Interior mural at Coit Tower

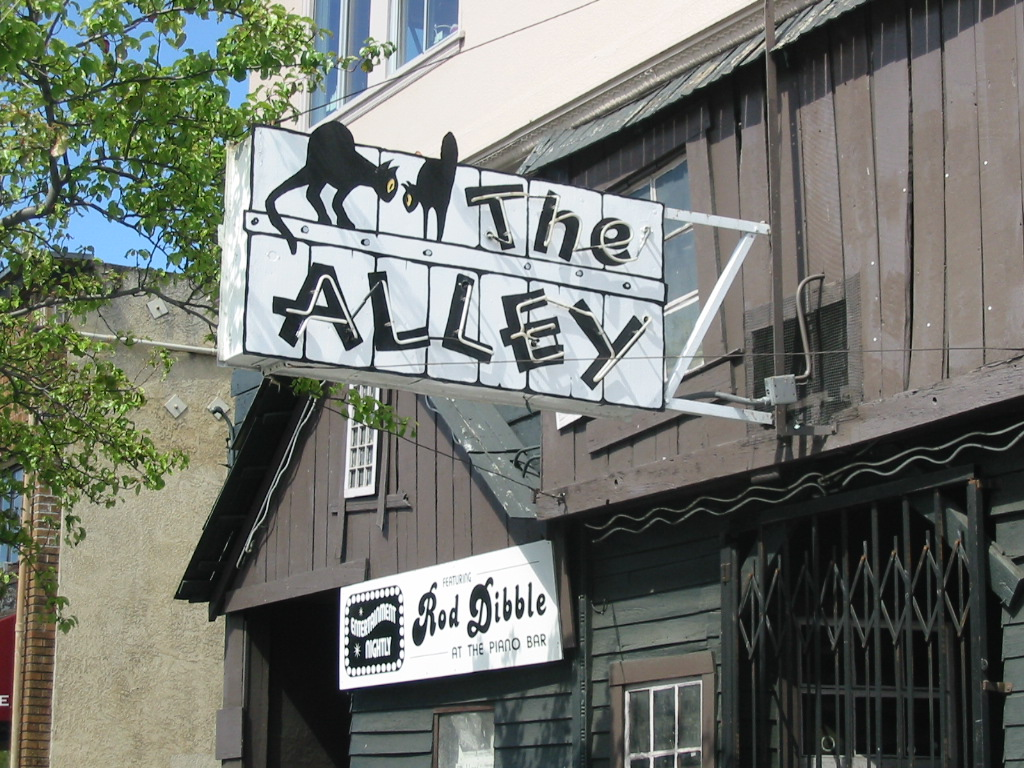
The Alley, today

- Coit Tower in San Francisco is completed (interior mural pictured)
- The Alley (pictured), a restaurant and piano bar in Oakland, opens
- The Oakland Symphony is formed as a volunteer community orchestra
- The San Francisco City Clinic for treating sexually transmitted diseases is established
- The Black Cat Bar reopens in San Francisco, upon the repeal of Prohibition
- The alleged kidnappers and murderers of San Jose resident Brooke Hart are lynched
1934

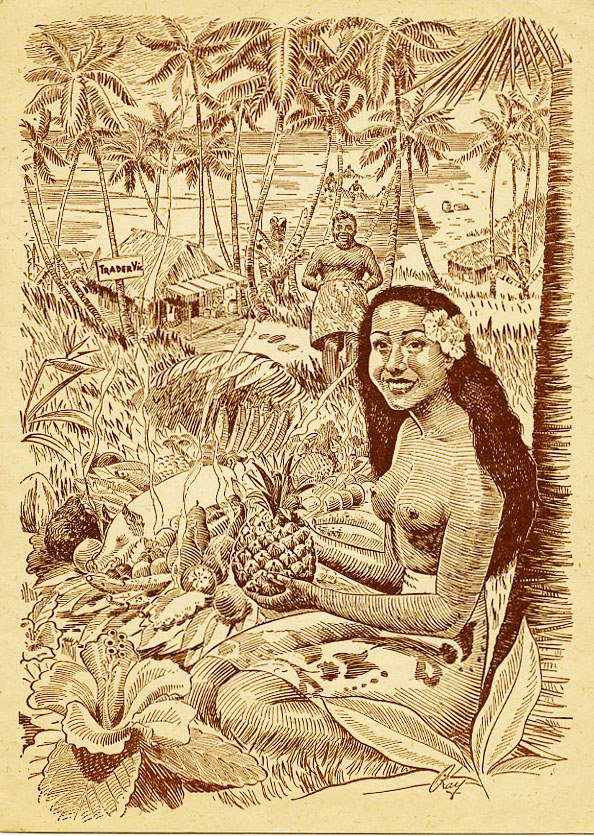
Trader Vic's menu

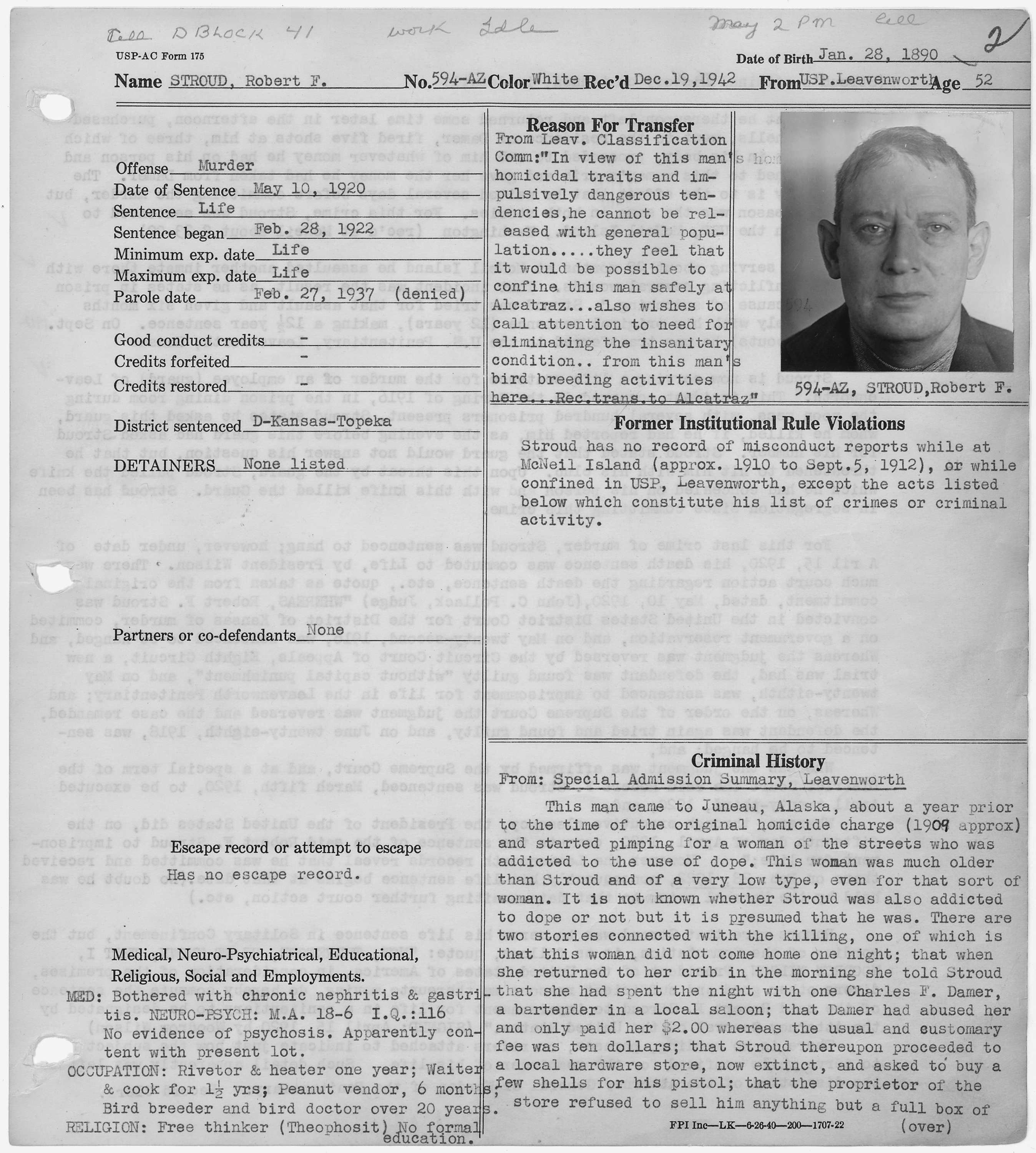
Warden's notebook page on Robert Stroud

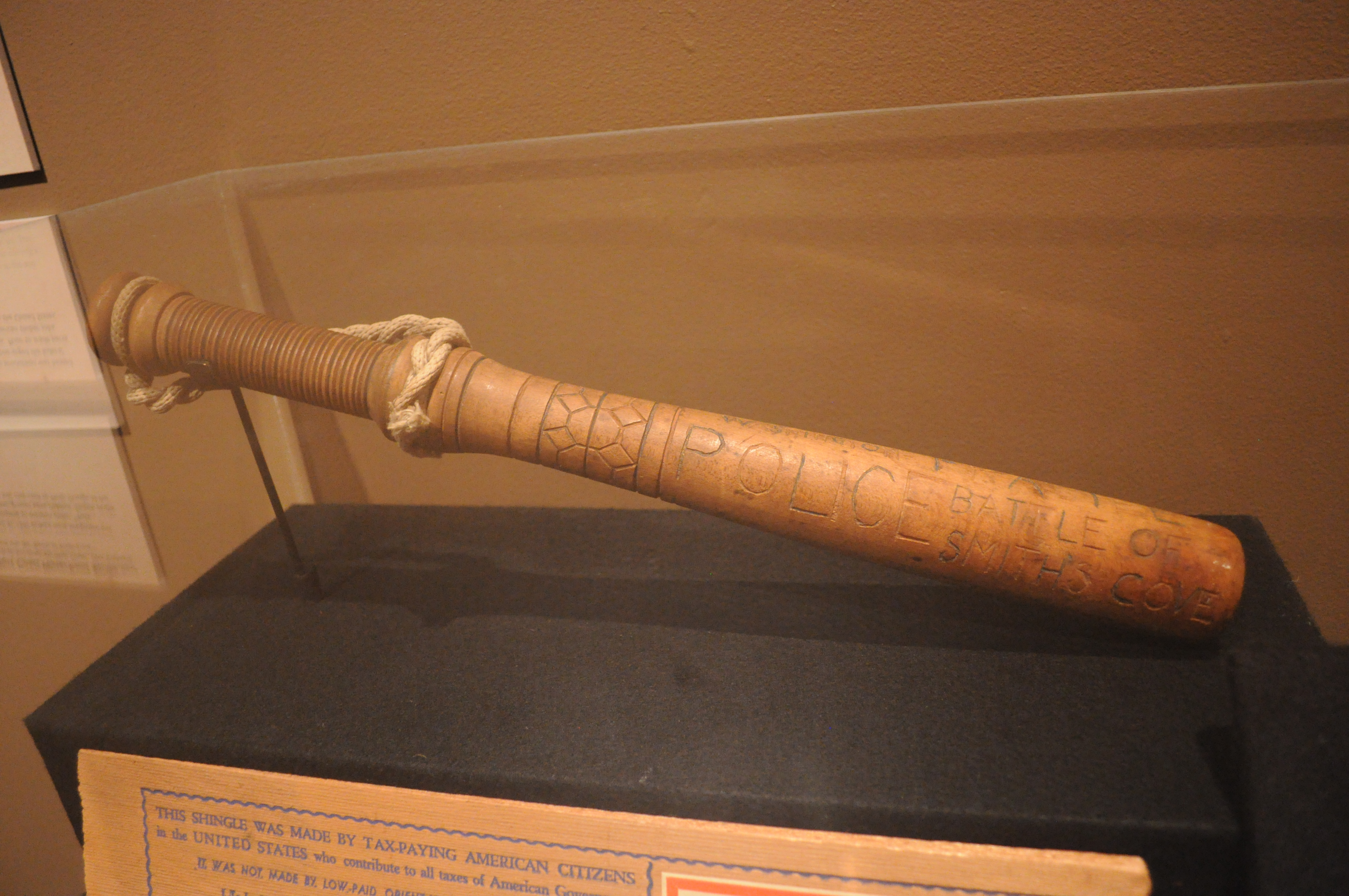
Billy club used at the strike in Seattle

- Alcatraz Federal Penitentiary is opened (Mugshot of Robert Stroud pictured, right)
- A waterfront strike along the West Coast begins in San Francisco (billy club used at the strike in Seattle pictured, right)
- The San Jose Light Opera Association is established
- Victor Jules Bergeron, Jr. opens a small bar/restaurant across from his parents' grocery store at San Pablo Avenue and 65th Street in Oakland, originally calling it "Hinky Dink's" (Trader Vic's menu pictured, left)
- The Wine Institute in San Francisco is cofounded by wine historian Leon Adams
- Palo Alto Junior Museum and Zoo was founded in Palo Alto by Josephine O'Hara in the basement of a local elementary school
1935

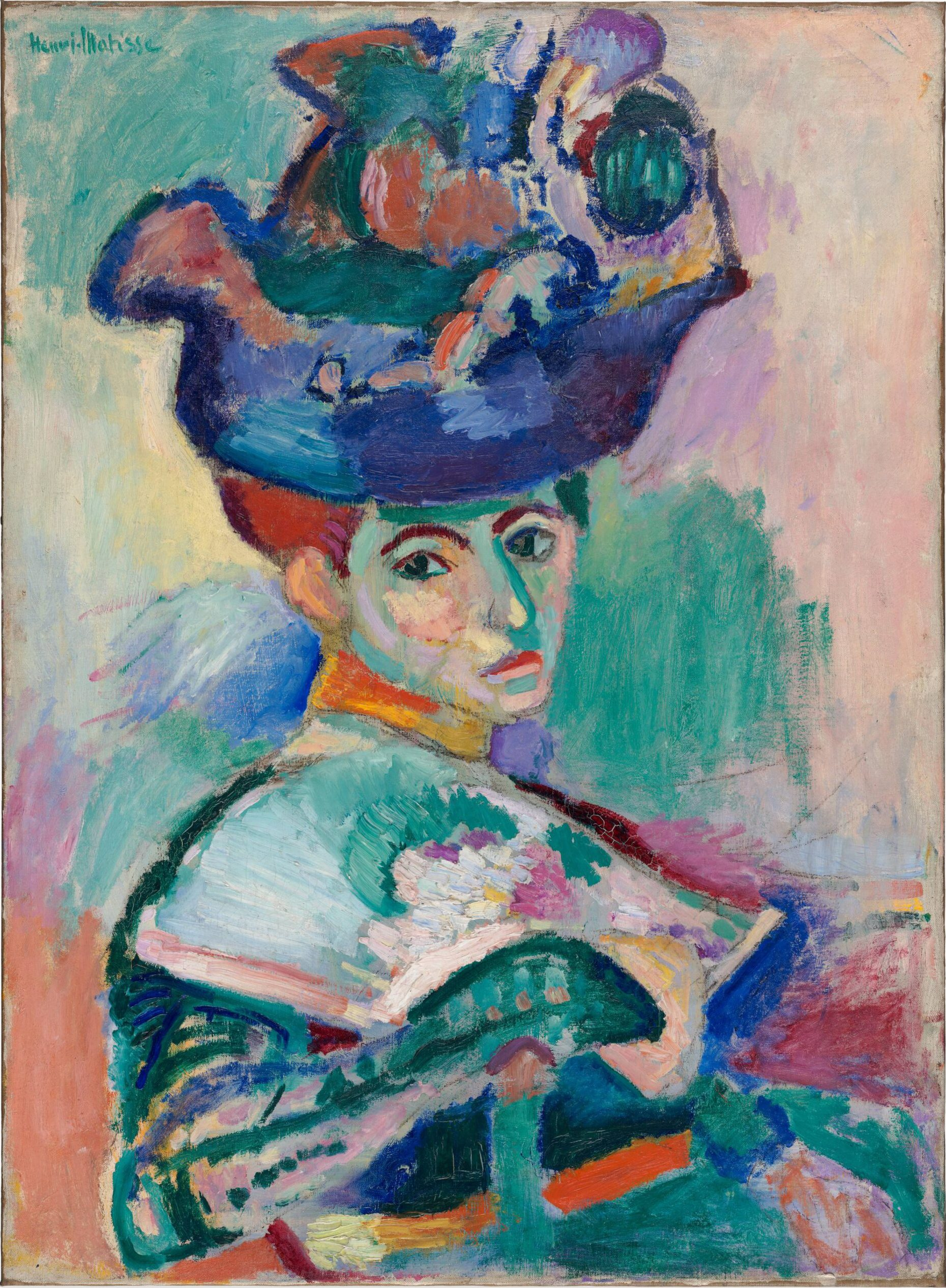
Woman with a Hat, from the SFMOMA collection

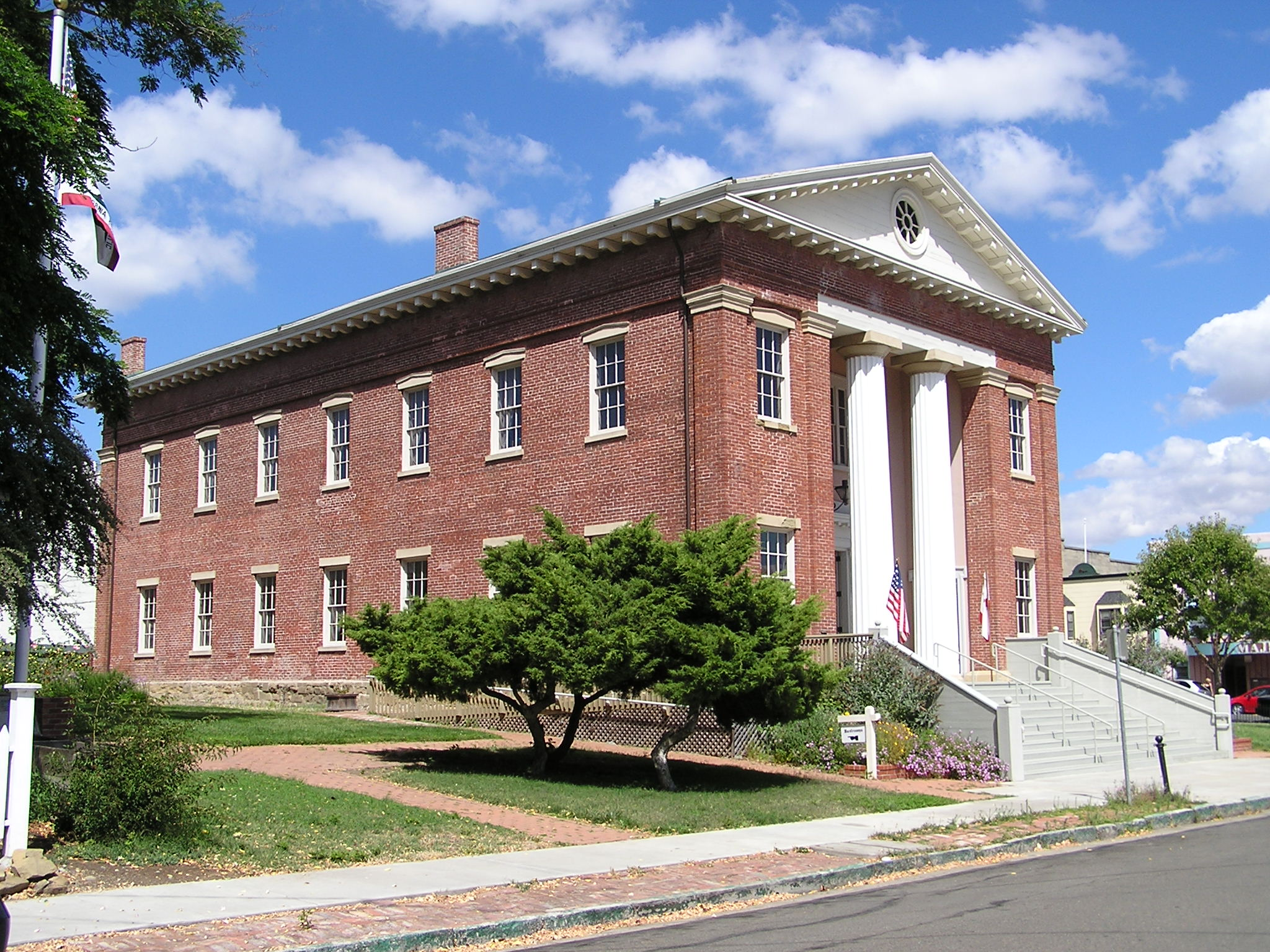
Former capitol building, Benicia

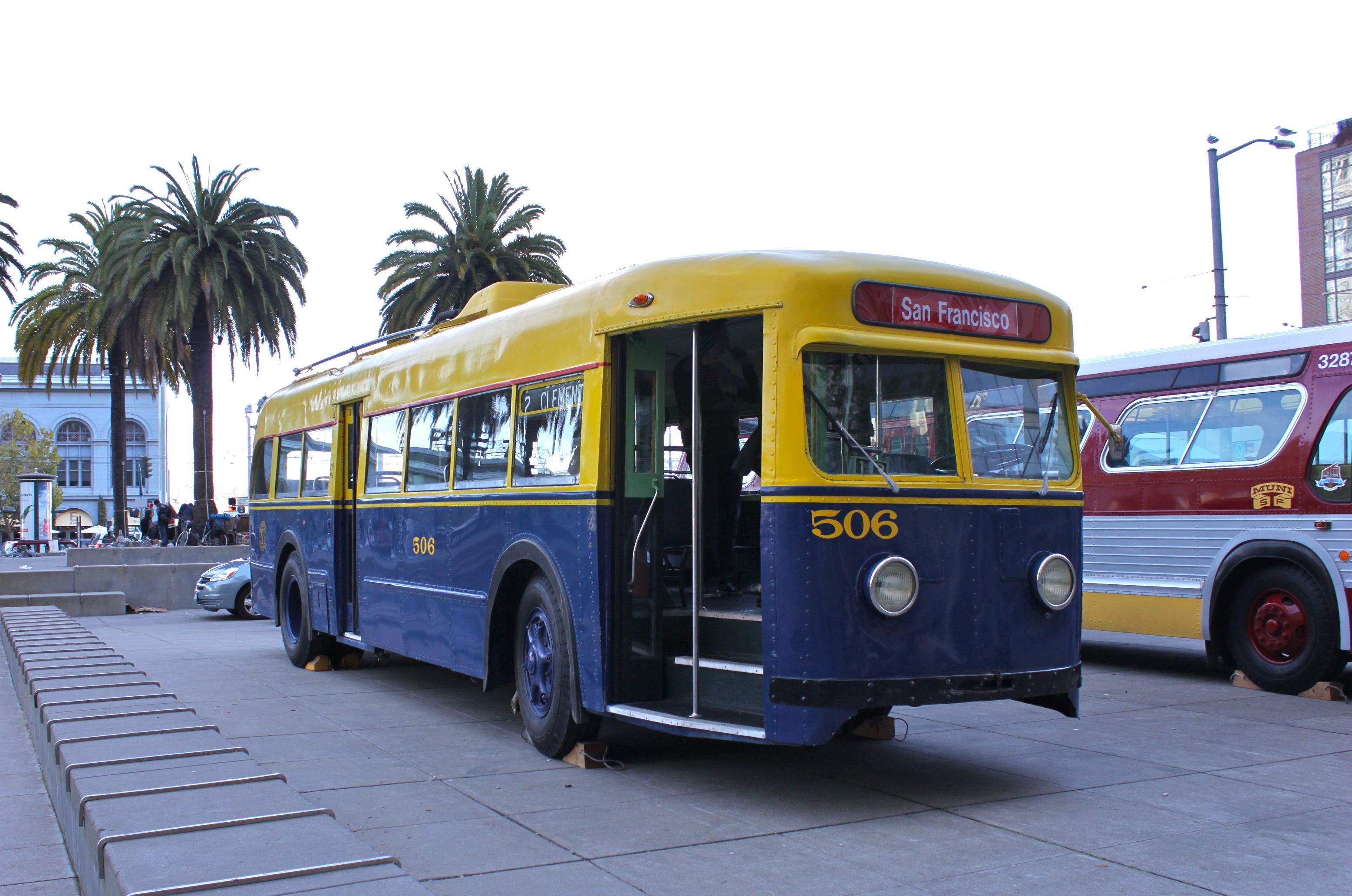
1941 trolleybus model

• The San Francisco Museum of Art opens at the War Memorial Veterans Building on Van Ness Avenue in the Civic Center (Woman with a Hat by Matisse, from the museum collection, pictured, left)
• Benjamin Franklin Davis, grandson of the man who helped develop Levi's jeans, opens his eponymous clothing store in San Francisco
• Benicia Capitol State Historic Park opens at the site of California's third capital building (pictured, right), where the California State Legislature convened from February 3, 1853 to February 24, 1854
• San Francisco Junior College is established
• Lucky Stores is founded in Alameda County
• Trolleybuses (pictured, right) began operating in San Francisco

1936

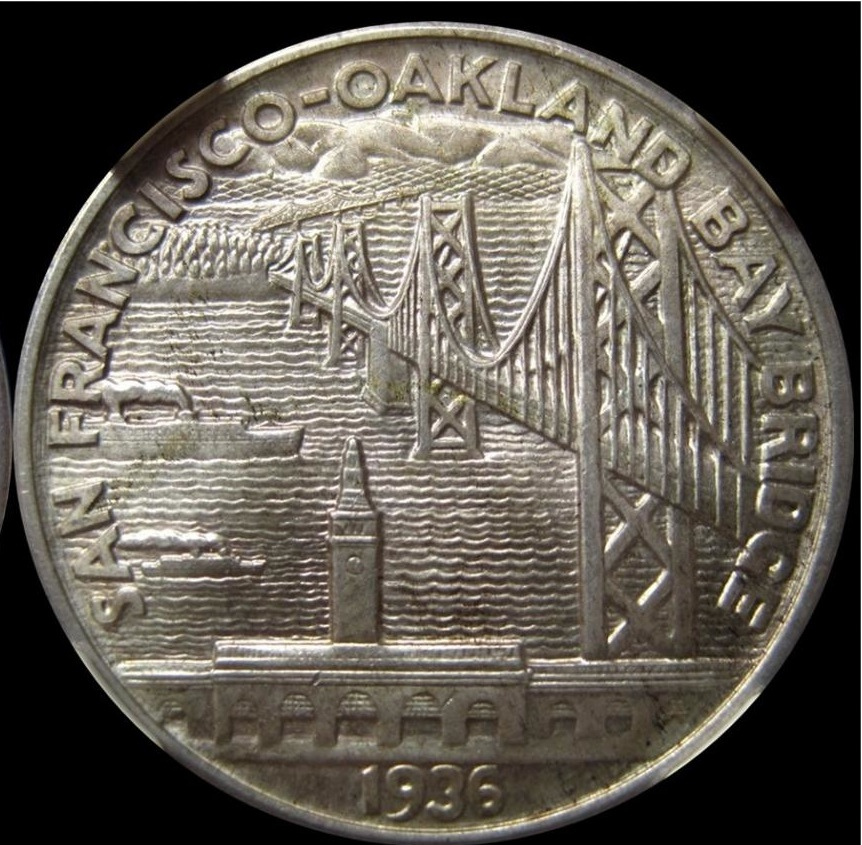
Commemorative coin

- The San Francisco Oakland Bay Bridge opens to traffic, in a ceremony attended by former U.S. president Herbert Hoover, among others (Bridge commemorative coin from 1936 pictured)
- Cliff's Variety Store in The Castro, San Francisco opens for business
- Former San Francisco political boss Abe Ruef dies
- Lafayette Park is created in San Francisco
1937

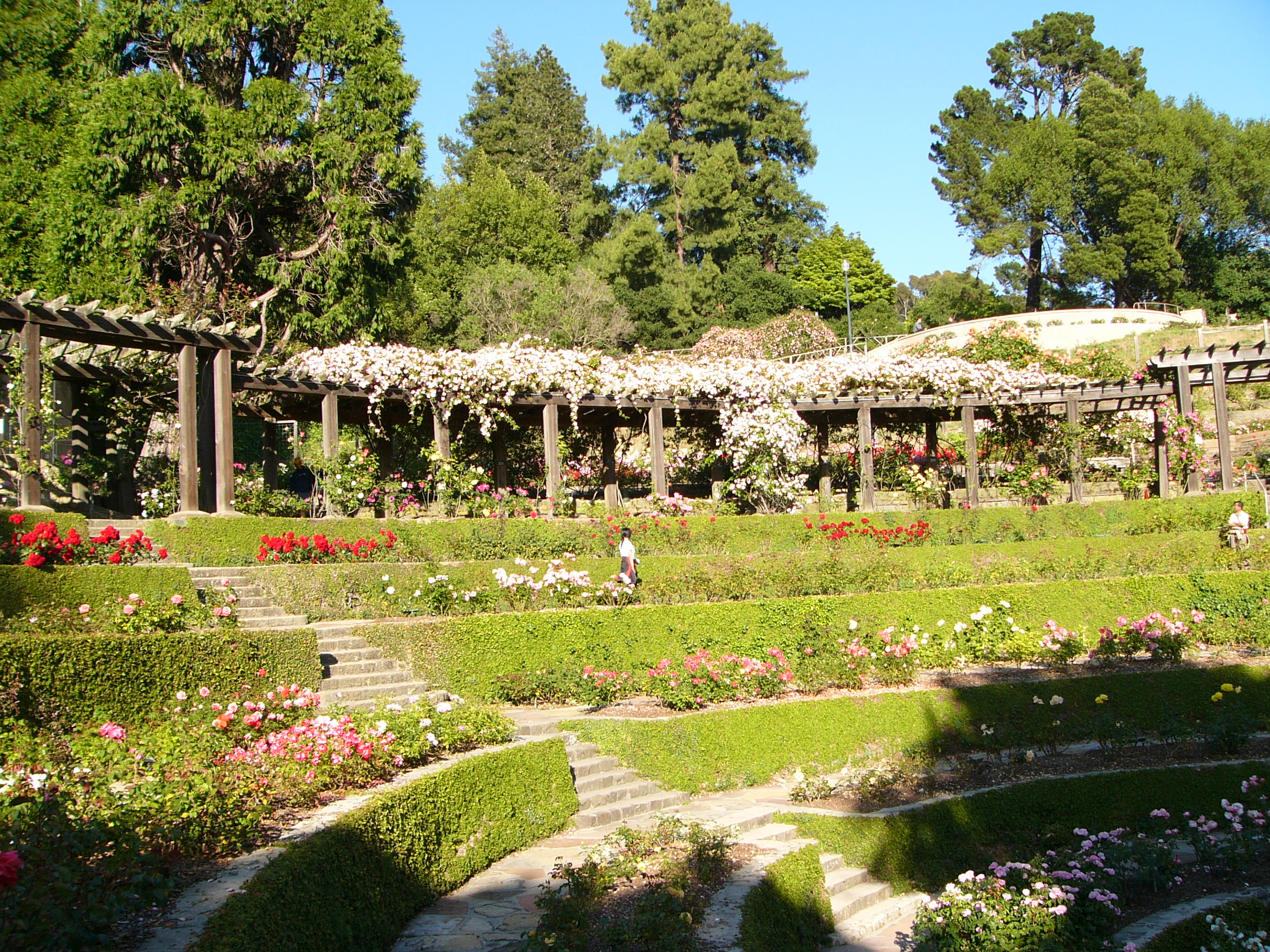
Berkeley Rose Garden

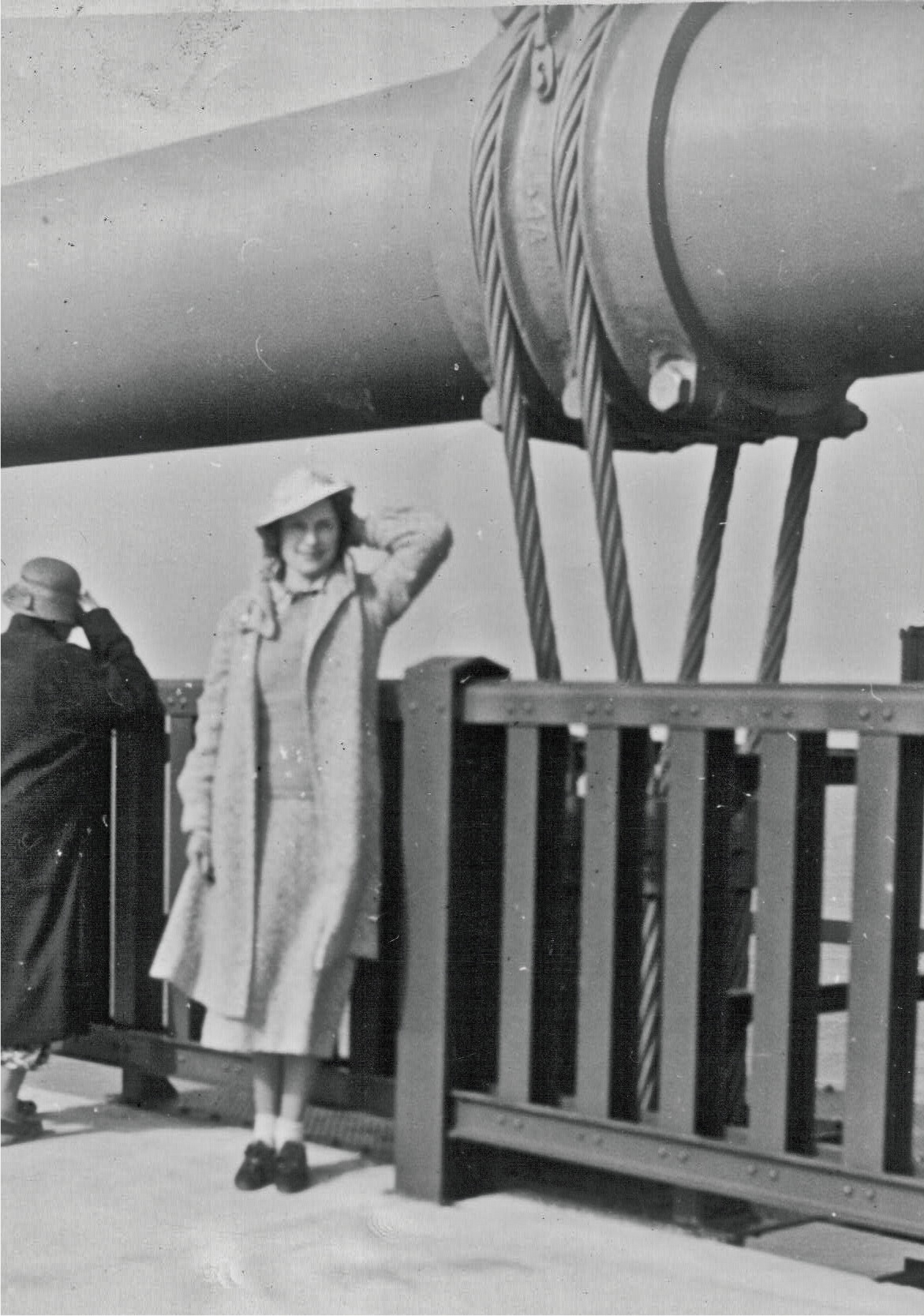
Opening day of the Golden Gate Bridge

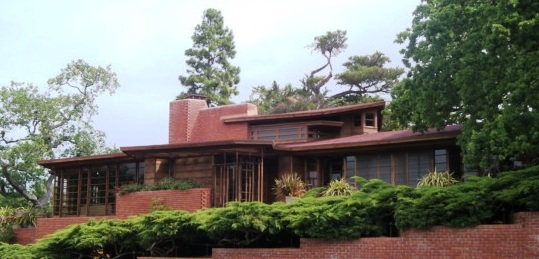
Hanna-Honeycomb House

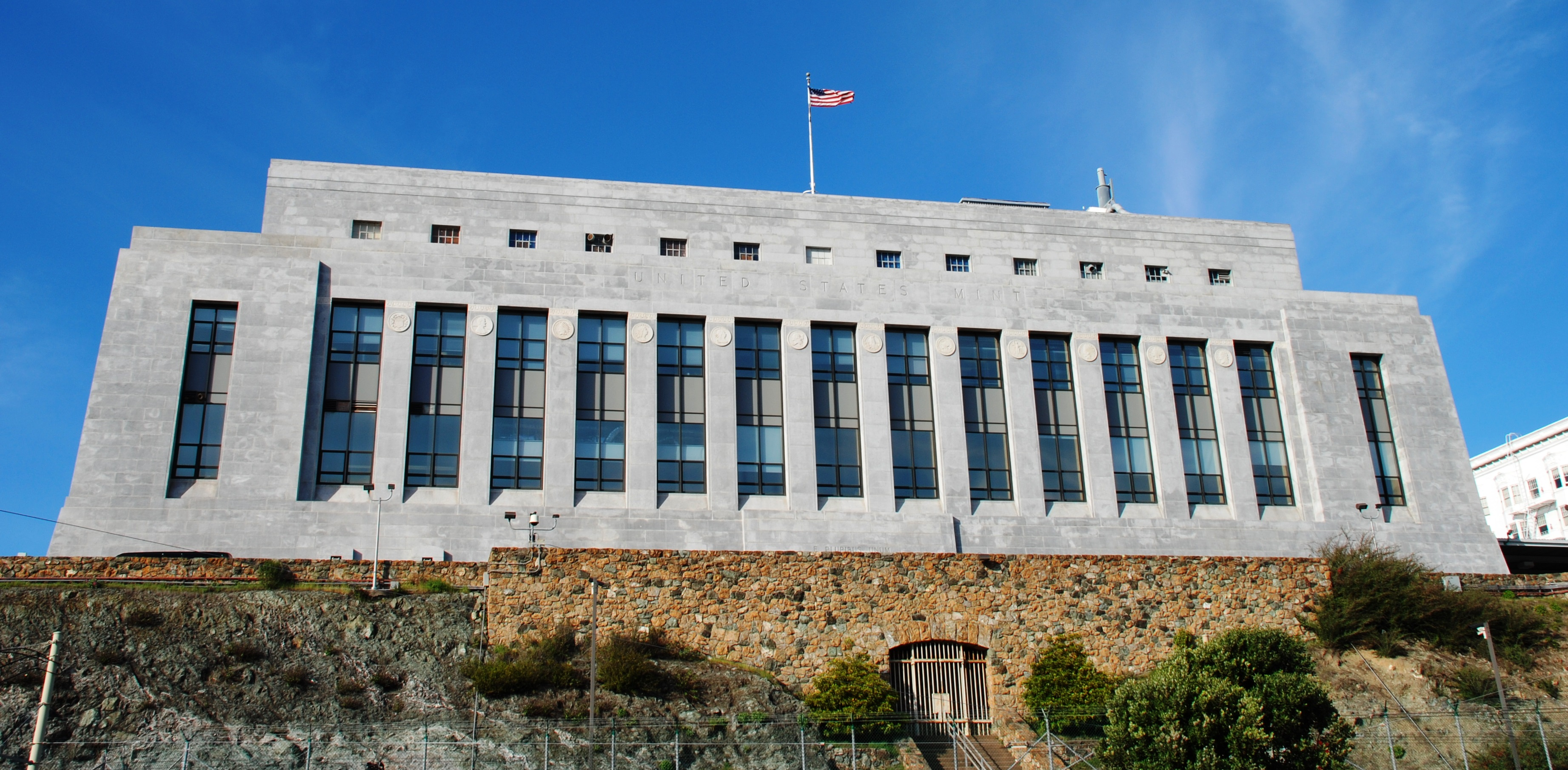
San Francisco Mint

• The Berkeley Rose Garden (pictured, right), built with funds from the Civil Works Administration, opens to the public
• The Golden Gate Bridge (opening day pictured, left) opens to the public
• The Hanna–Honeycomb House (pictured, right), built by Frank Lloyd Wright at Stanford University, is completed
• The new San Francisco Mint (pictured, right) is completed
• Stanford Memorial Auditorium is completed
• Golden Gate National Cemetery in San Bruno is dedicated
• The Malloch Building in San Francisco is completed

1938

49 Mile Scenic Drive sign

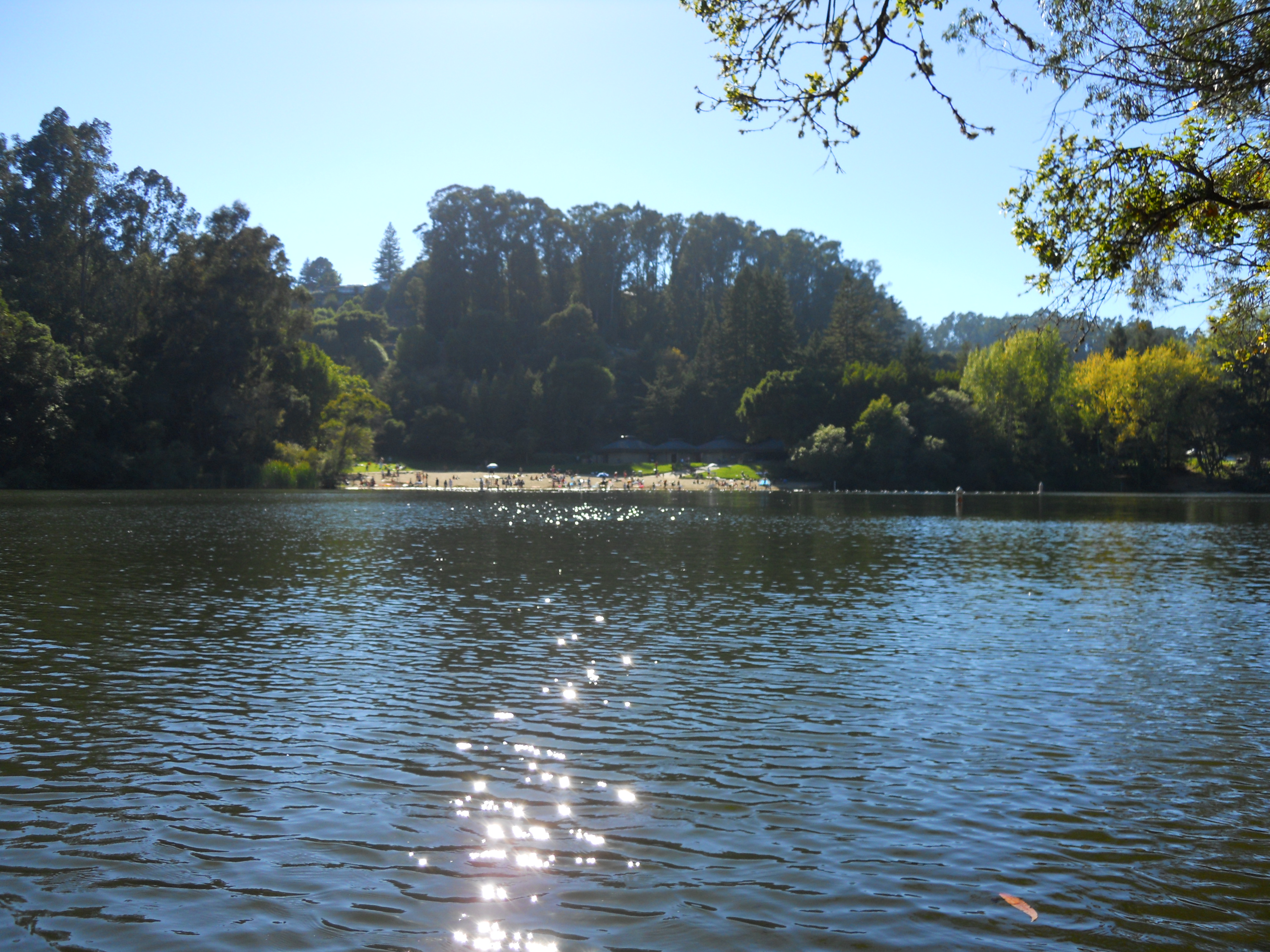
The beach at Lake Anza

• The 49-Mile Scenic Drive (road sign pictured, left) is created in San Francisco for the Golden Gate International Exposition by the San Francisco Down Town Association
• Lake Anza (pictured, right) is created in Tilden Park in the Berkeley Hills

1939

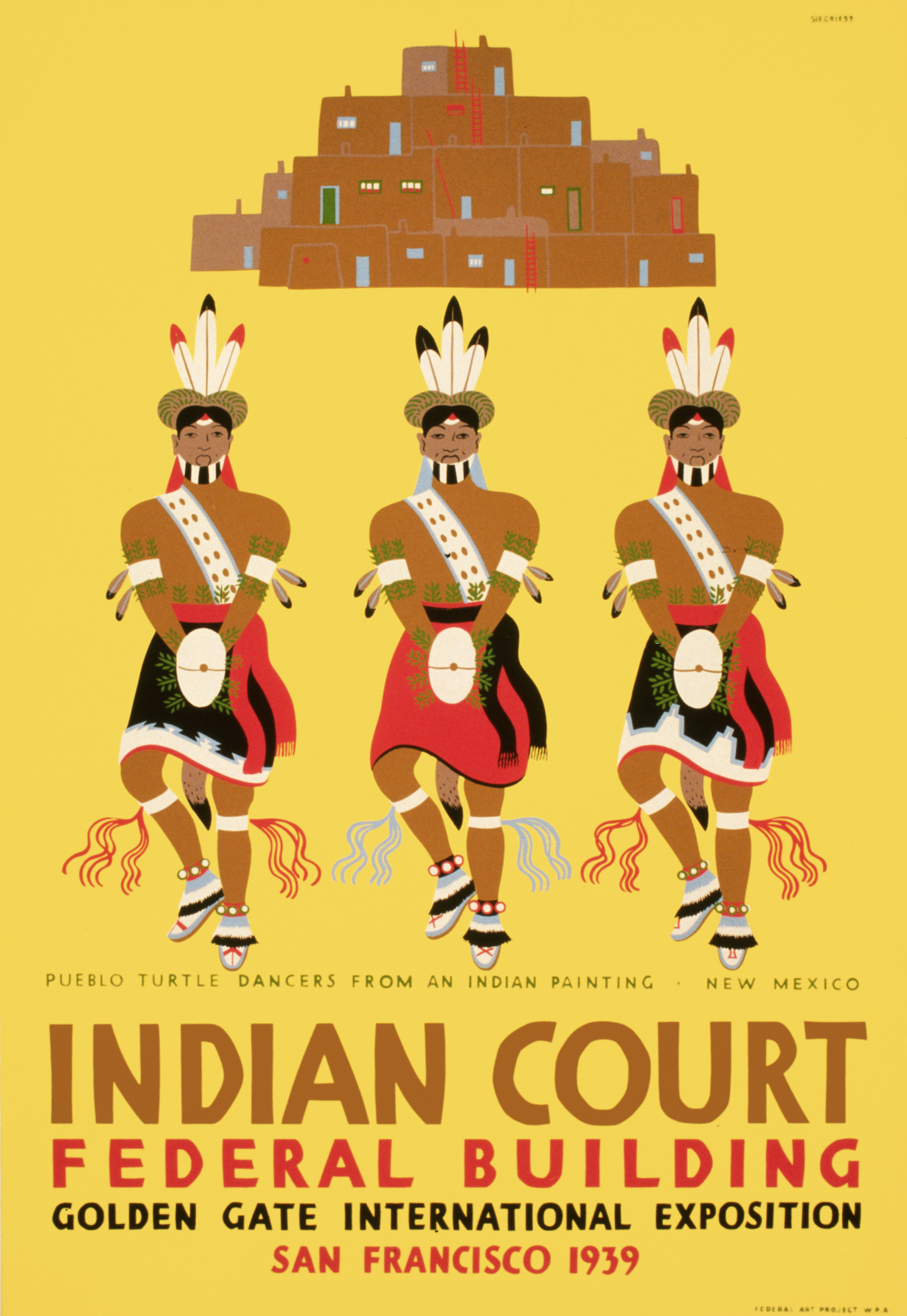
Poster from the Golden Gate International Exhibition

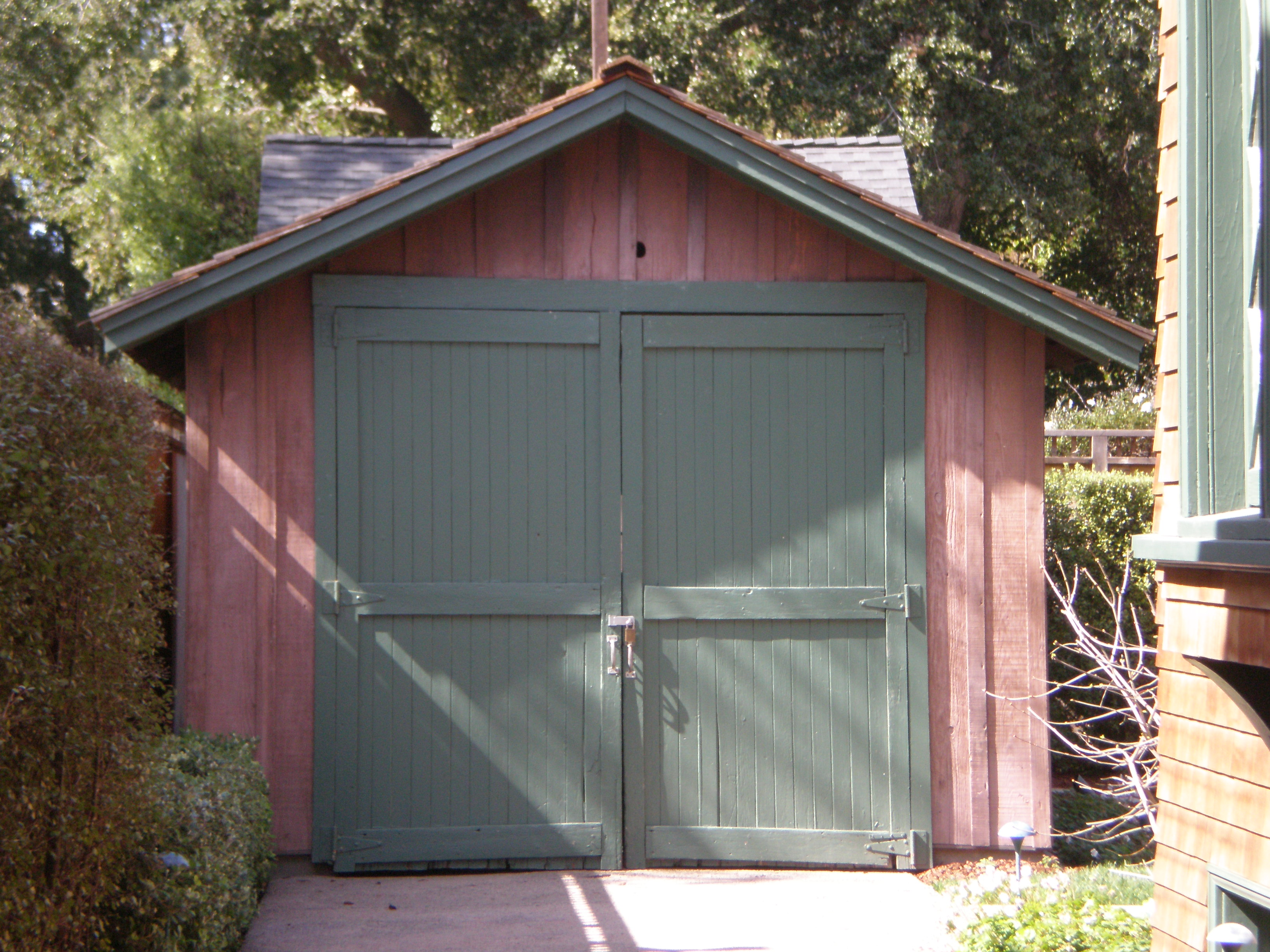
HP Garage

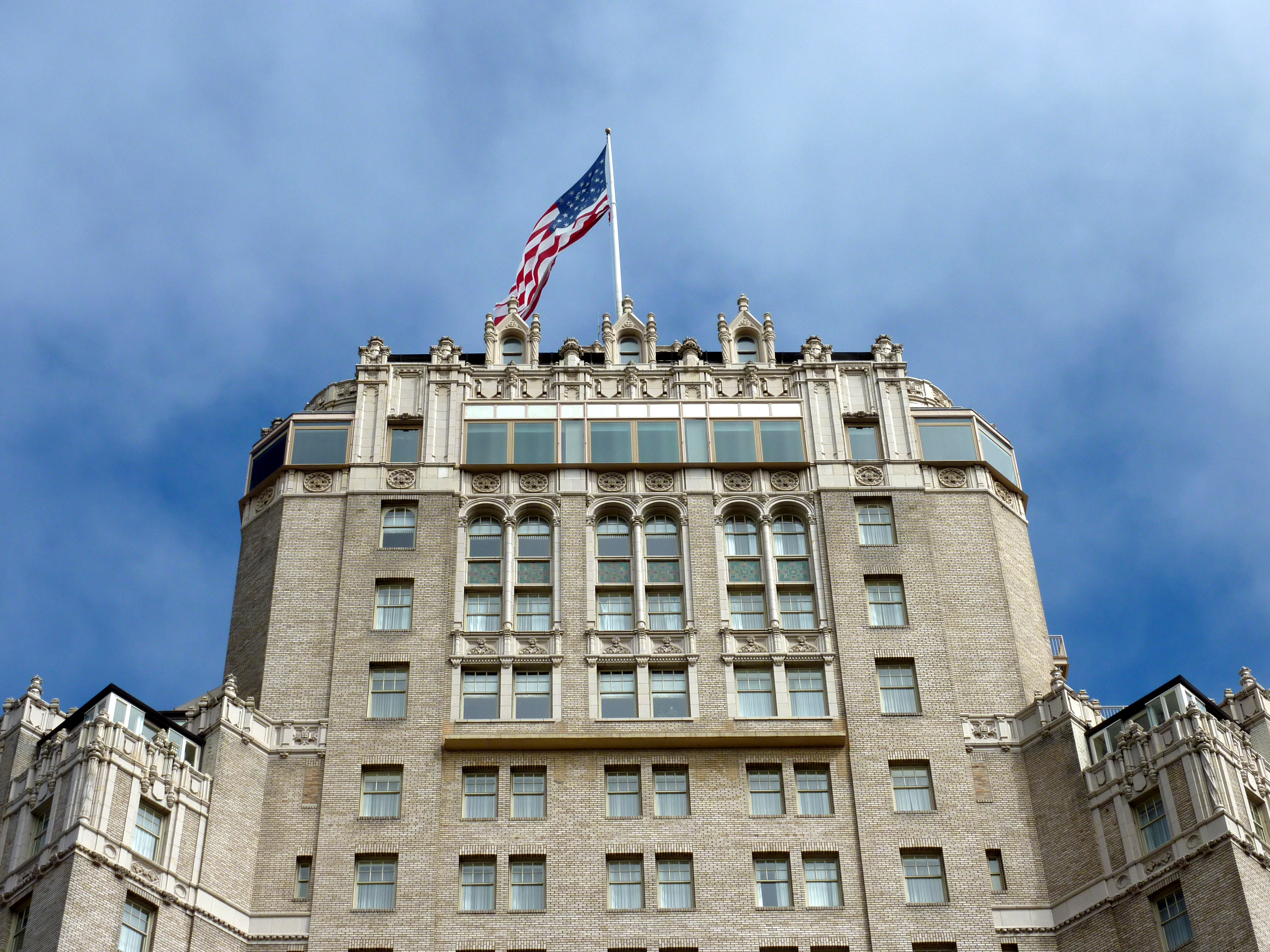
Top of the Mark

• The Golden Gate International Exposition (poster pictured, left) opens at newly created Treasure Island
• The Neptune Beach amusement park closes in Alameda
• Hewlett-Packard is founded in a garage (pictured) in Palo Alto
• Blue Shield of California is founded in San Francisco by the California Medical Association
• Consumers' Cooperative of Berkeley opens, having formed from the Berkeley Buyers' Club, which was associated with the End Poverty in California movement
• The Top of the Mark rooftop bar (pictured) is established at the top of the Mark Hopkins Hotel on Nob Hill in San Francisco
• Nuclear scientist Ernest Lawrence at the University of California, Berkeley wins the Nobel Prize for Physics for his invention of the cyclotron

1940

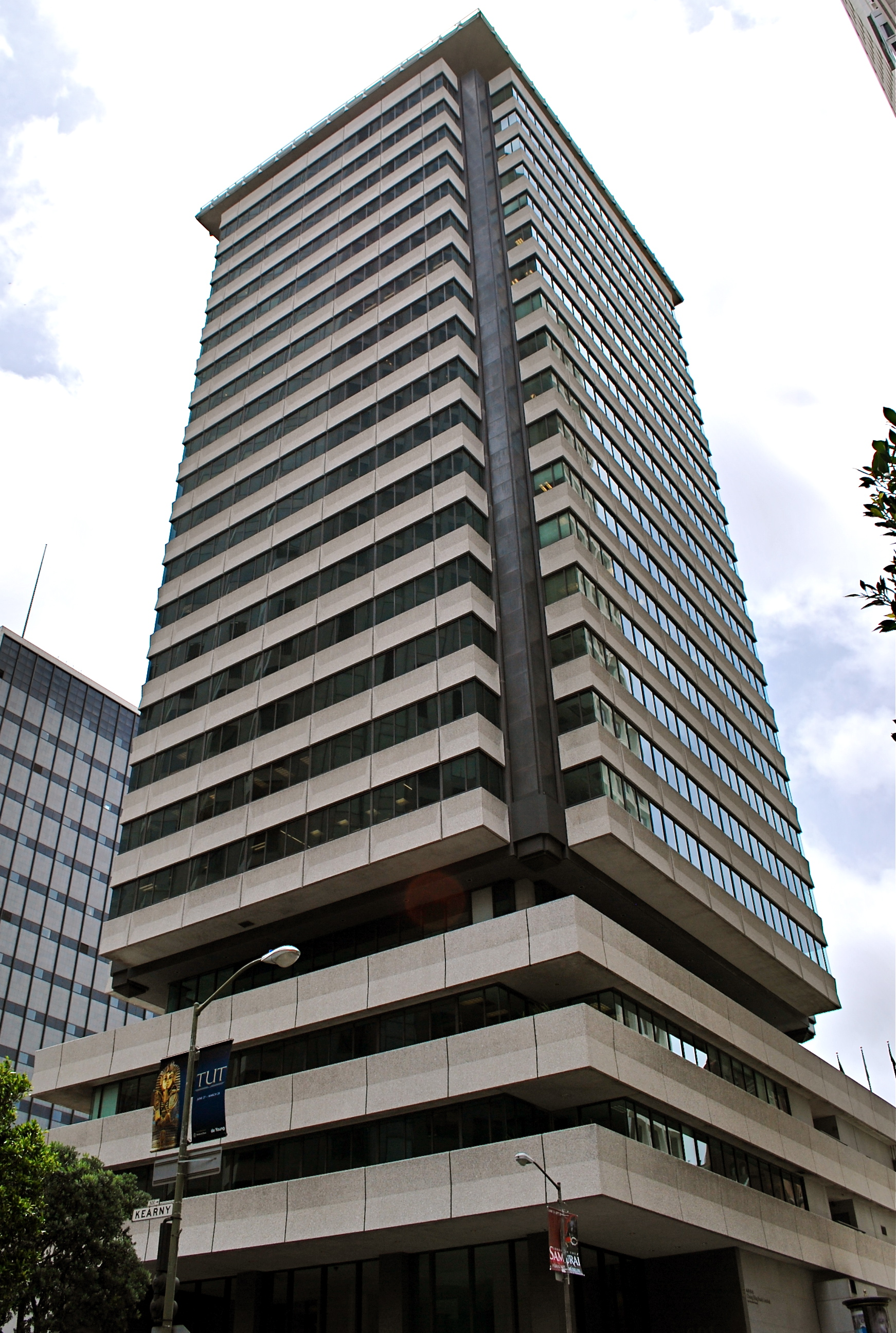
601 California Street, San Francisco

- The Anshen + Allen architectural firm (the International Building in San Francisco, designed by firm, pictured) is founded by Frank Lloyd Wright disciple Rob Anshen, and Steve Allen, in San Francisco
- Palo Alto Airport of Santa Clara County begins operations
- Neptunium and Plutonium are synthesized at the Berkeley Radiation Laboratory
- steamship company Swayne & Hoyt retires from business
1941

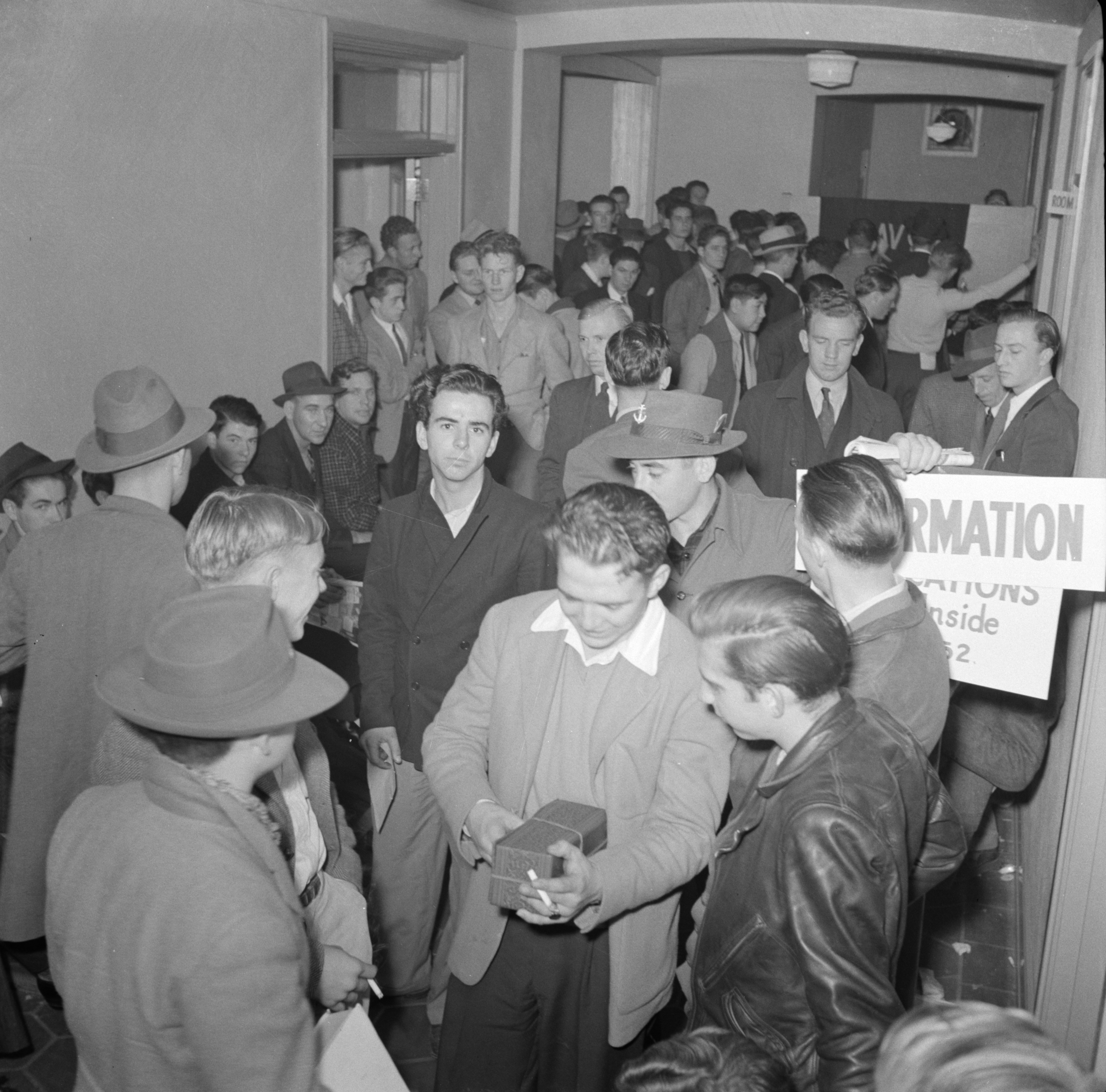
San Francisco recruiting office

- Treasure Island is leased to the United States Navy, which opens Naval Station Treasure Island the next year
- World War II enlistment commences in the Bay Area (San Francisco recruiting office pictured)
- A two-masted schooner, Benicia, built in Tahiti by a shipwright who had worked in Matthew Turner's Benicia shipyard, arrives in San Francisco under the French flag
- The Xerces blue butterfly is last observed in San Francisco either this year, or in 1943
1942

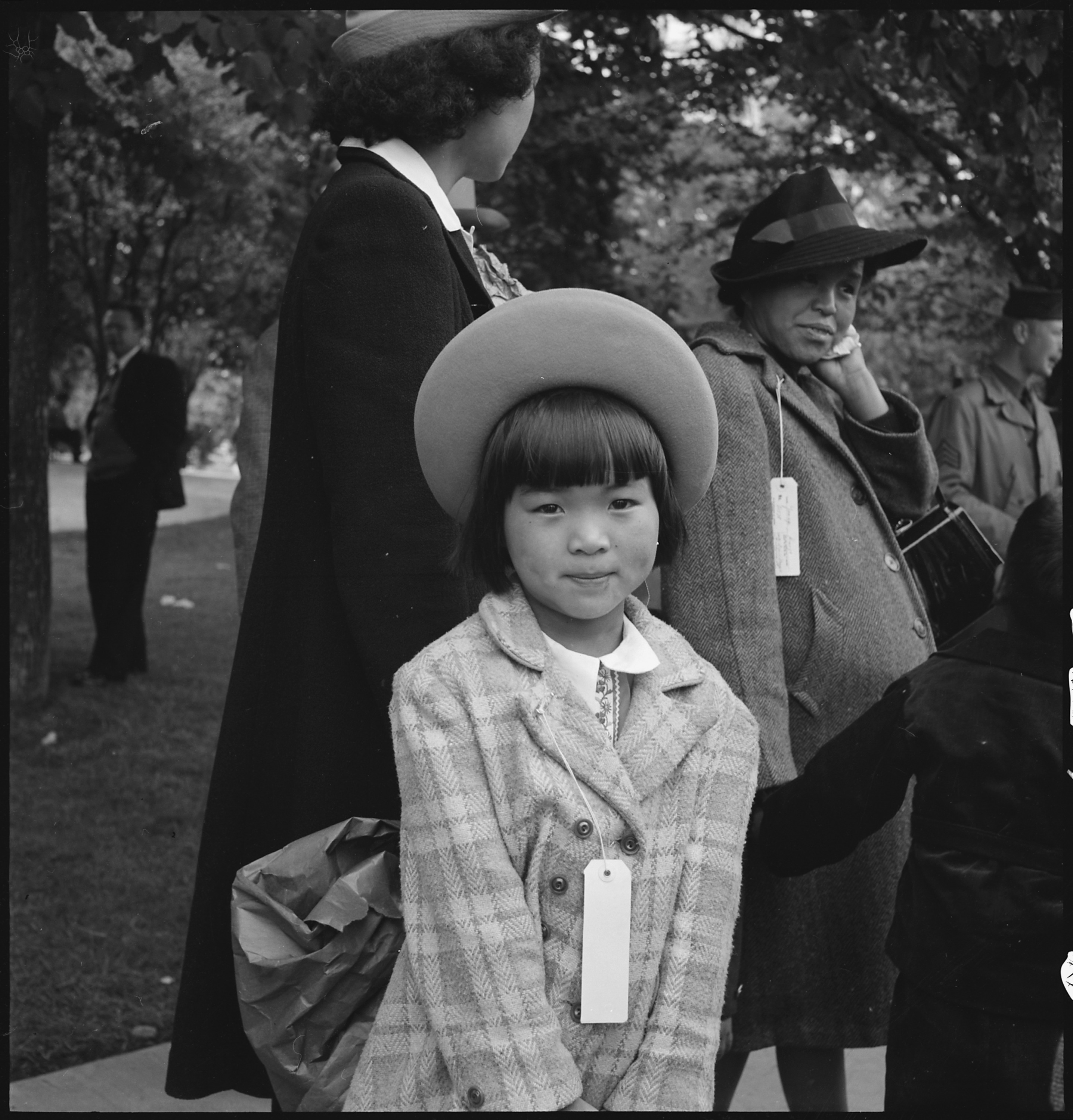
Japanese American girl, waiting for transport

- The Concord Army Air Base in Contra Costa County begins operations
- The Santa Rosa Army Air Field in Sonoma County begins operations
- The transport of Japanese Americans to "War Relocation Camps" (pictured) begins in the San Francisco Bay Area
1943

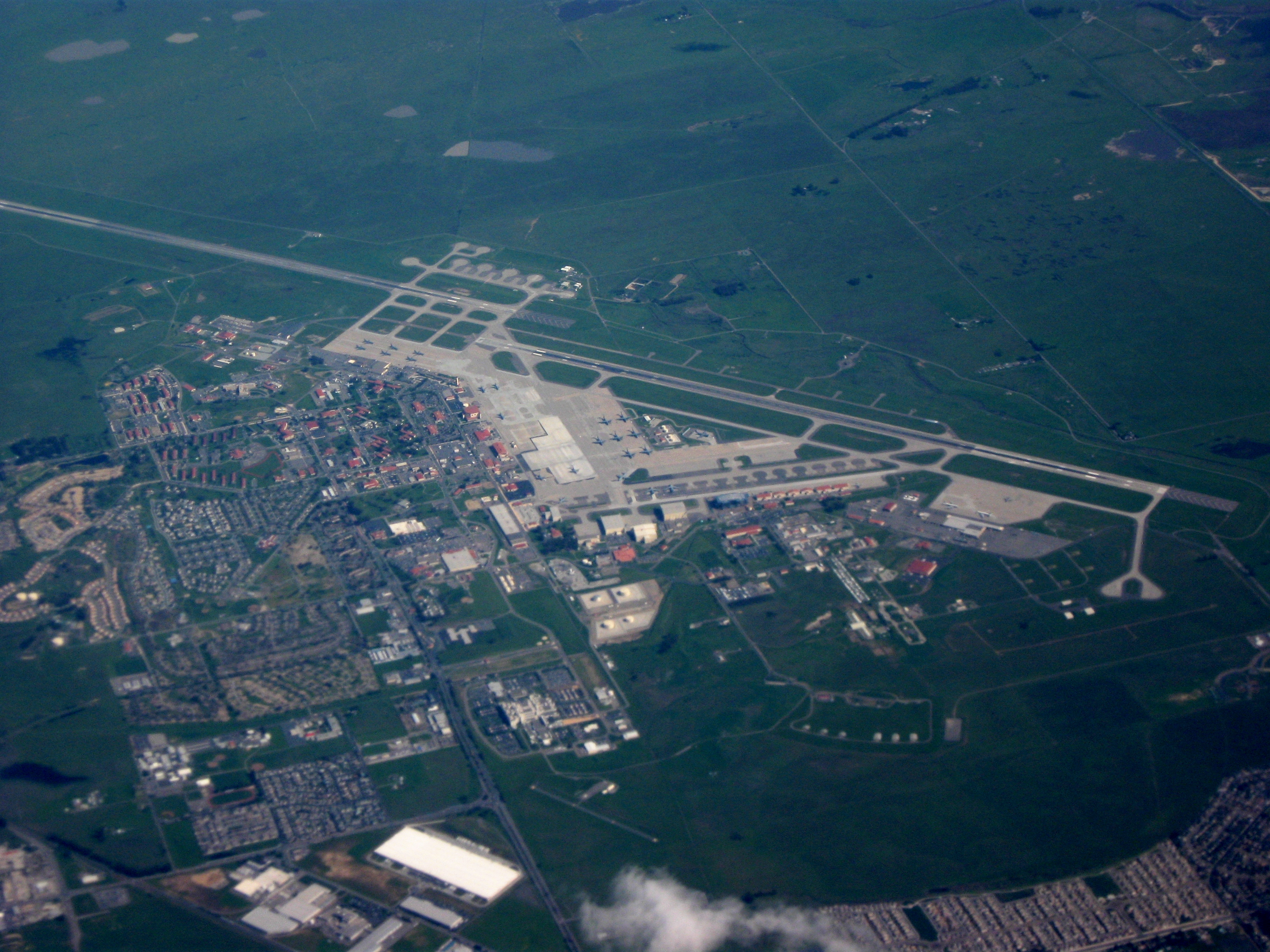
Travis Air Force Base

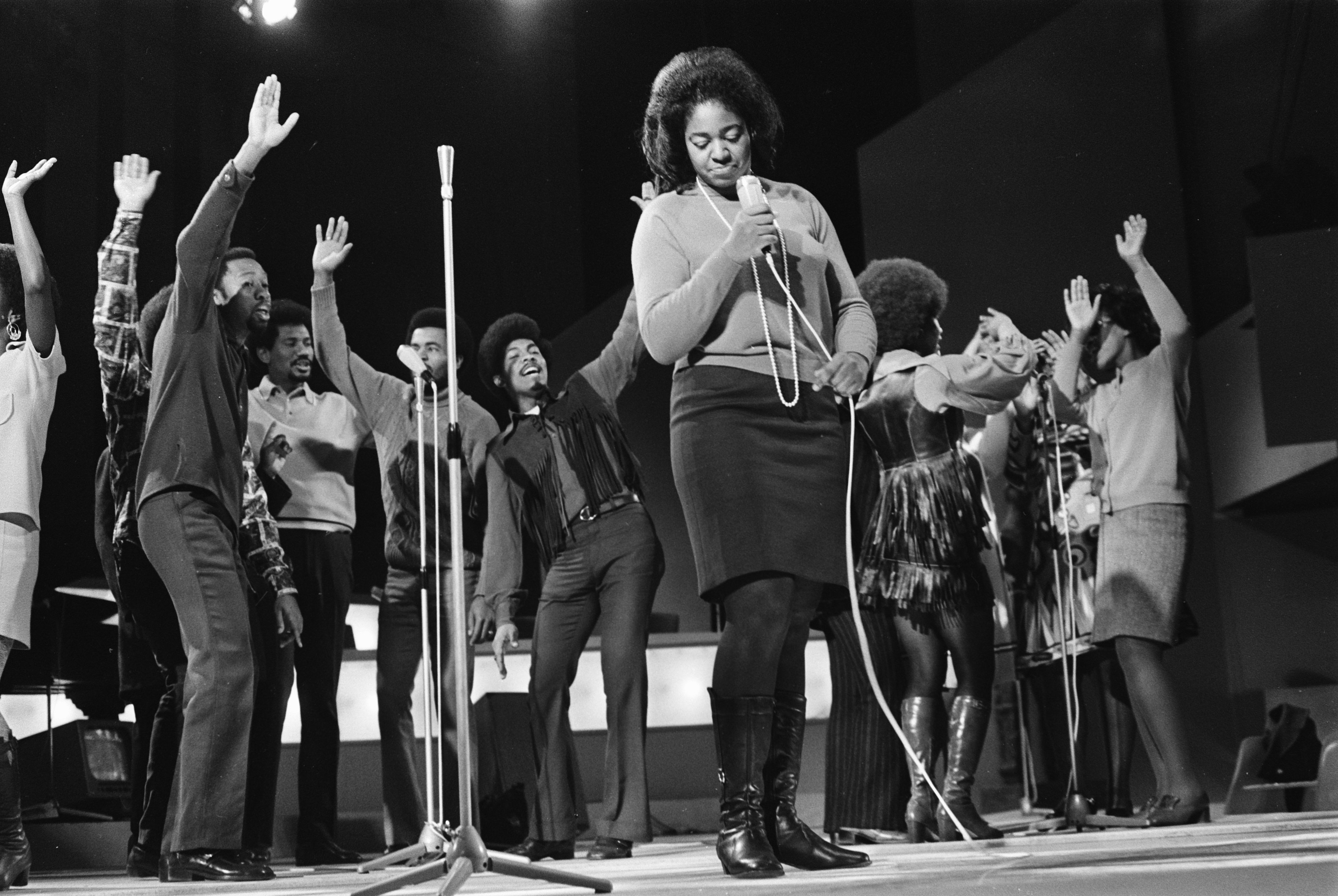
Edwin Hawkins Singers

• The Fairfield-Suisun Army Air Base (pictured, right), near Fairfield, in Solano County, is officially activated
• Golden Gate Park superintendent John McLaren dies
• Edwin Hawkins is born in Oakland (Edwin Hawkins Singers pictured, left)

1944

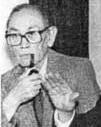
Fred Korematsu

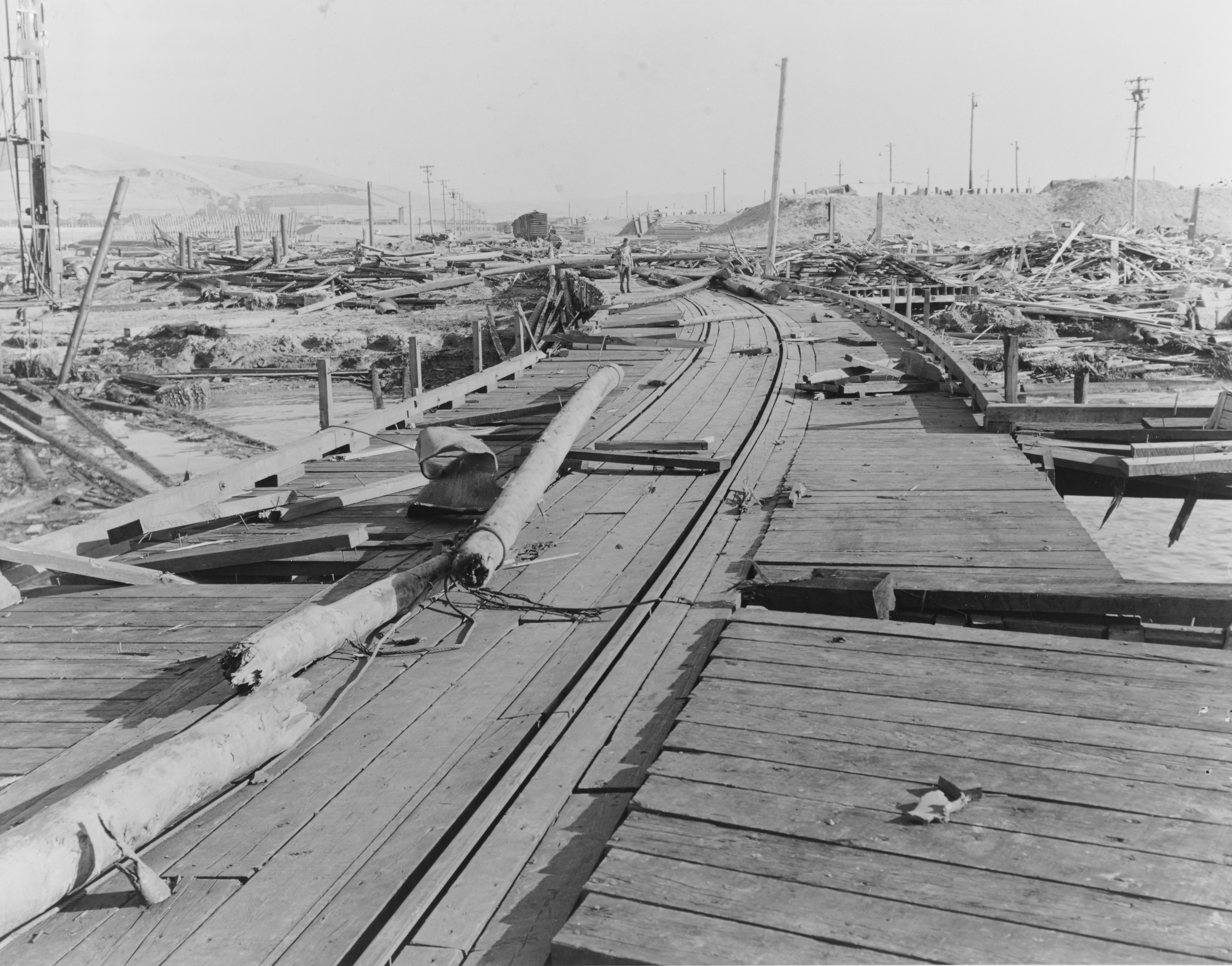
Port Chicago disaster aftermath

- In Korematsu v. United States (plaintiff Fred Korematsu pictured), concerning the constitutionality of Executive Order 9066, which ordered Japanese Americans into internment camps during World War II regardless of citizenship, the Supreme Court sides with the government, ruling that the exclusion order was constitutional
- A munitions explosion (pictured) at the Port Chicago Naval Magazine in Port Chicago kills 320 sailors and civilians and injures 390 others, with most of the dead and injured enlisted African-American sailors.
- George P. Miller is elected to California's 6th congressional district
- The Hayward Area Recreation and Park District is created
- Americium and curium are synthesized at the University of California, Berkeley, with the discovery kept secret due to World War II
1945

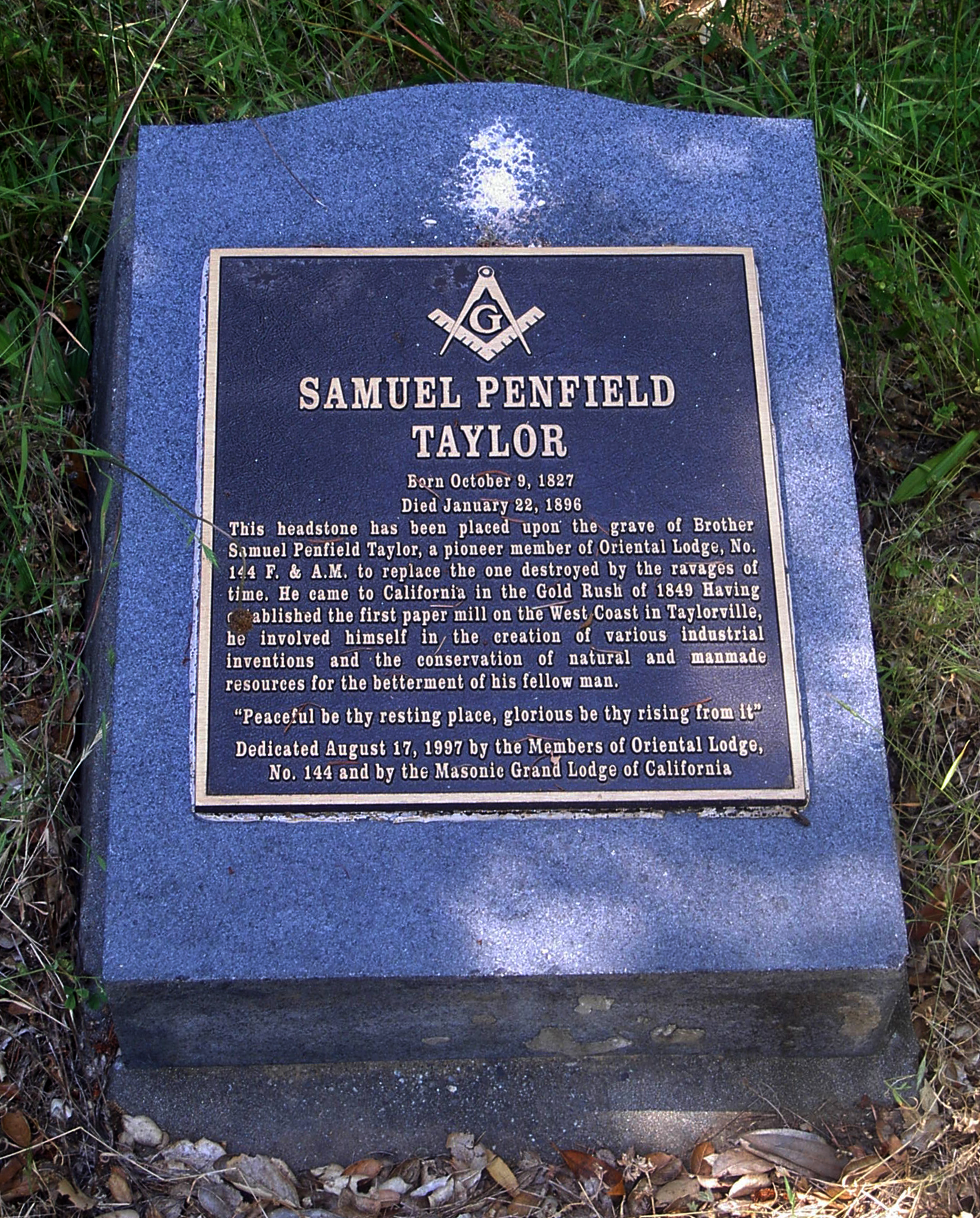
Samuel Penfield Taylor gravesite

- The United Nations Charter is signed at the San Francisco War Memorial and Performing Arts Center in San Francisco
- Following the effective end of World War II on Victory over Japan Day, thousands of drunken people, the vast majority of them Navy enlistees who had not served in the war theatre, embarked in what the San Francisco Chronicle summarized in 2015 as "a three-night orgy of vandalism, looting, assault, robbery, rape and murder" and "the deadliest riots in the city's history", with more than 1000 people injured, 13 killed, and at least six women raped.
- The Tonga Room restaurant and tiki bar opens at the Fairmont San Francisco
- San Francisco-based Western Pipe and Steel Company ends operations
- The Bay Area Council for economic development is founded in San Francisco
- Samuel P. Taylor State Park is established in Marin County (gravesite of Samuel Penfield Taylor, at park, pictured)
1946

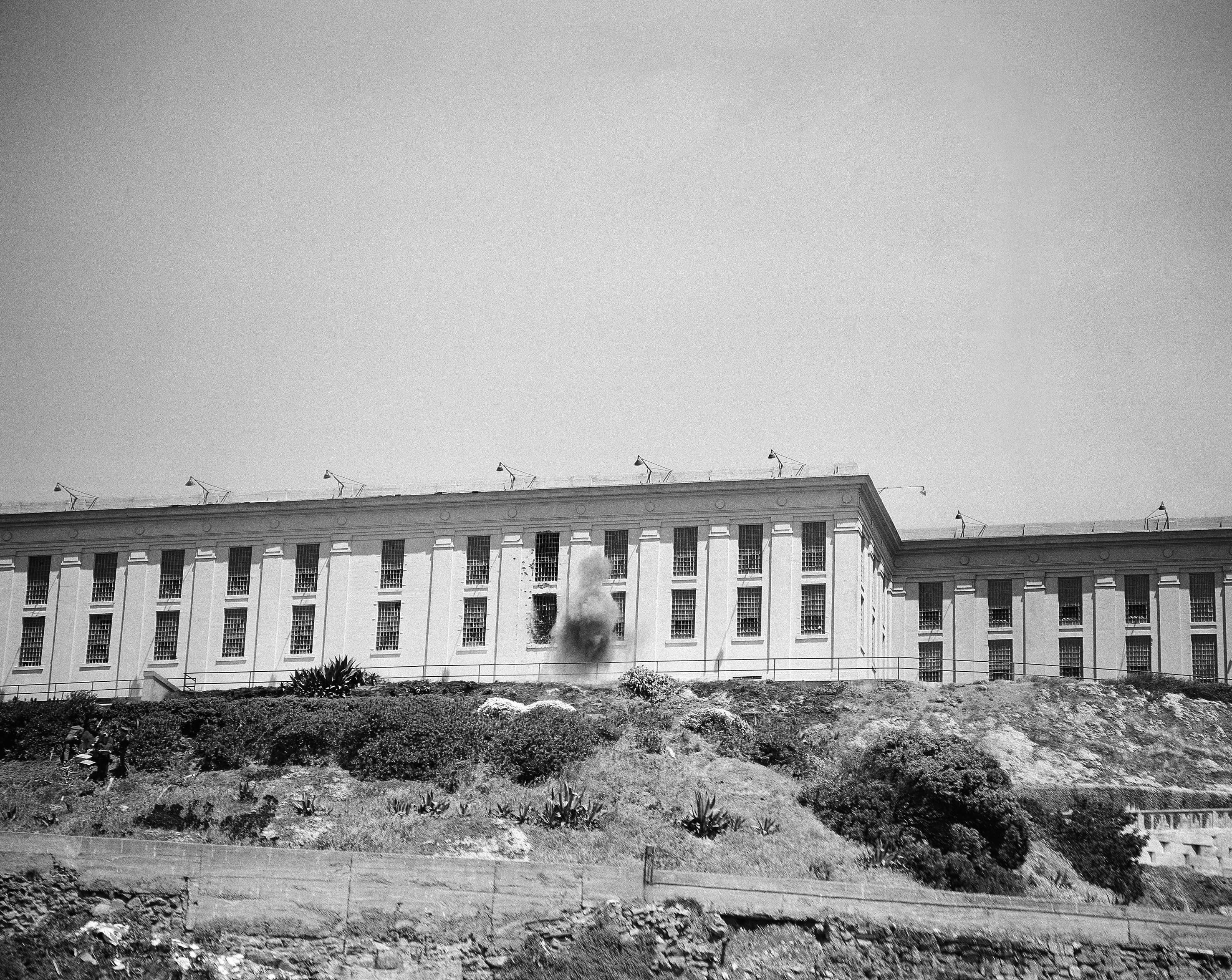
Alcatraz shelling damage

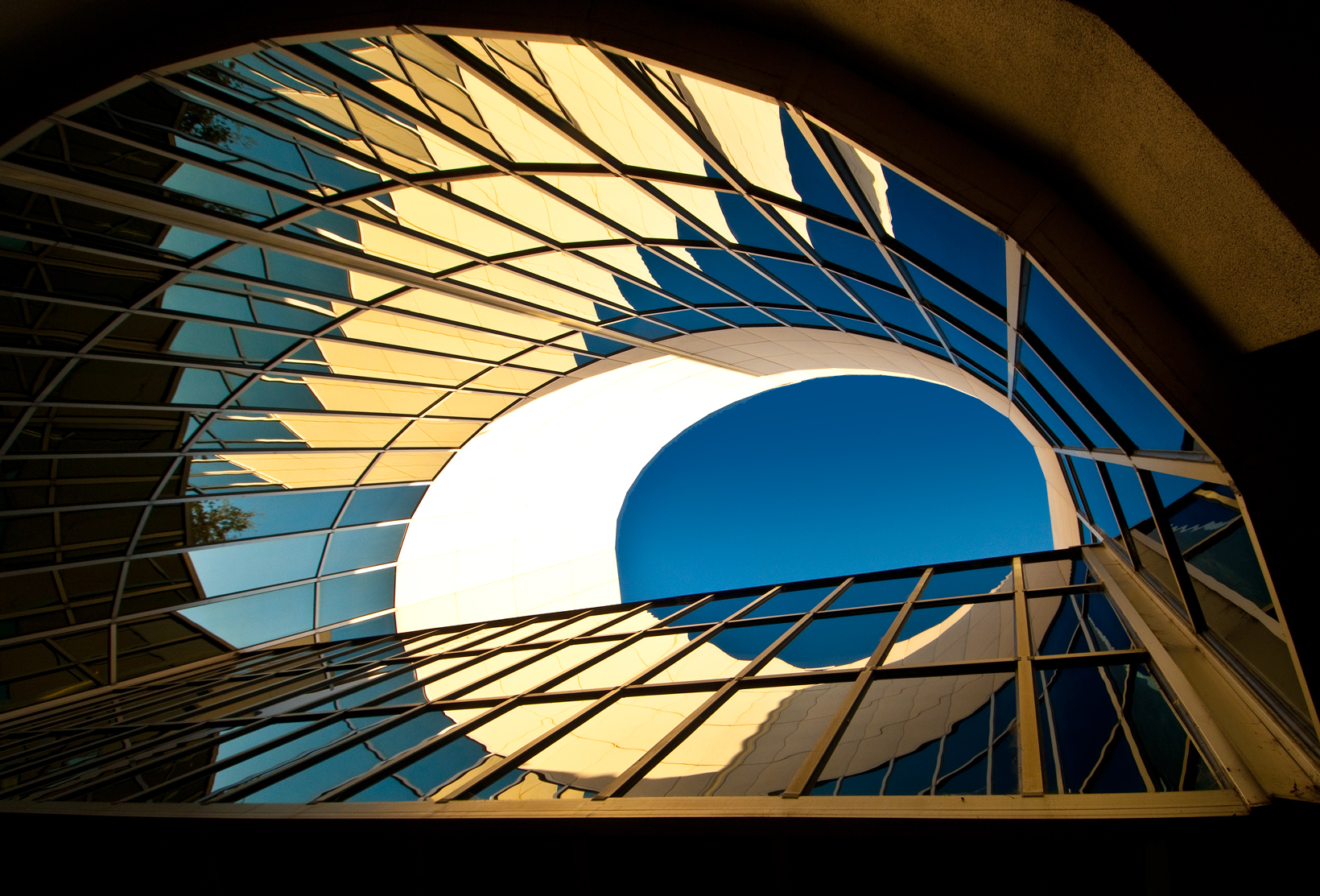
SRI International building

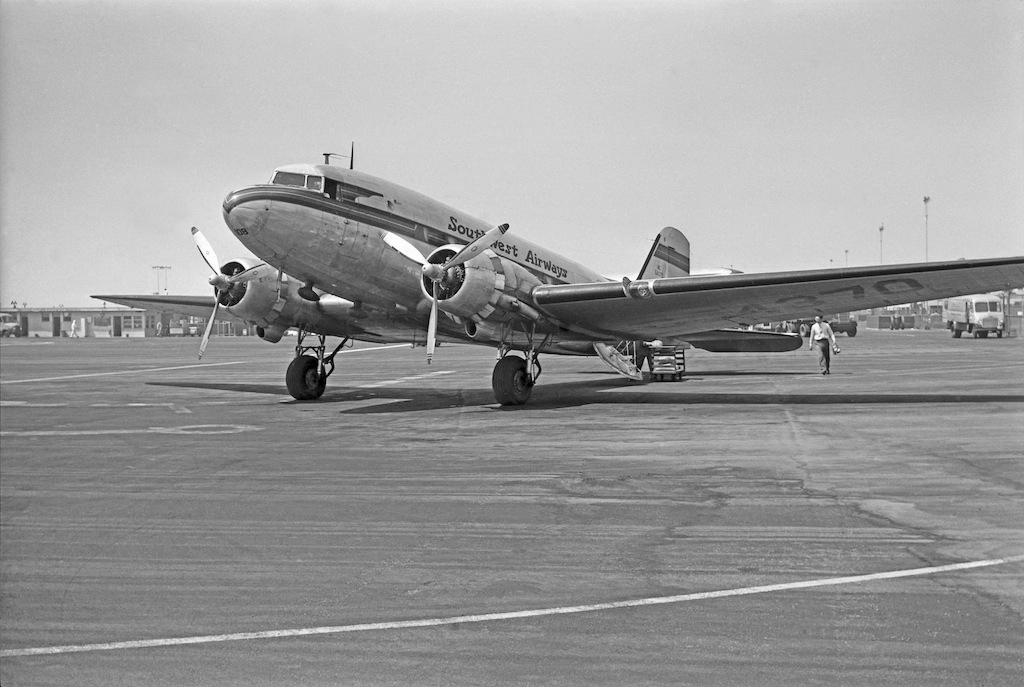
Southwest Airways plane

- Two guards and three inmates die during an unsuccessful escape attempt (pictured) from Alcatraz Federal Penitentiary
- Cargo airline Emery Worldwide begins operating out of Redwood City
- Potato chip maker Granny Goose is founded in Oakland
- Overstock and government surplus Cannery Sales stores open in San Francisco
- Japanese American newspaper Nichi Bei Times begins publishing in San Francisco
- The Pacifica Foundation is created by World War II conscientious objectors E. John Lewis and Lewis Hill
- The Stanford Research Institute (contemporary building pictured) is founded in Menlo Park
- Sunset Books is founded by the San Francisco-based publishers of Sunset magazine
- Southwest Airways (plane pictured) begins operations out of San Francisco International Airport
1947
- The Contra Costa Times begins publishing in Walnut Creek
- Mel's Drive-In opens in San Francisco
- Trans International Airlines begins service out of Oakland International Airport
- The University of California Police Department is created at the University of California, Berkeley (logo pictured)
1948

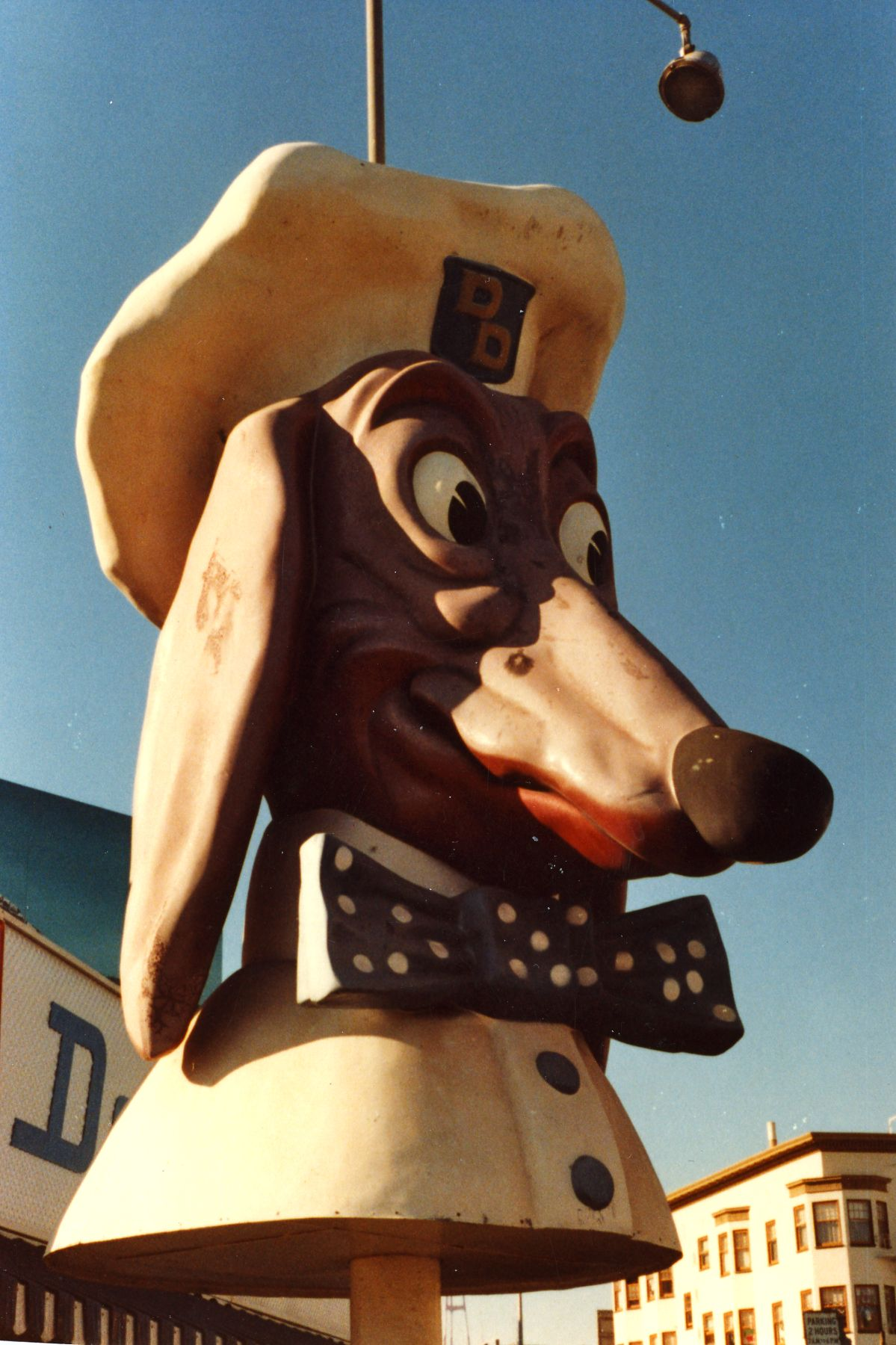
Doggie Diner head

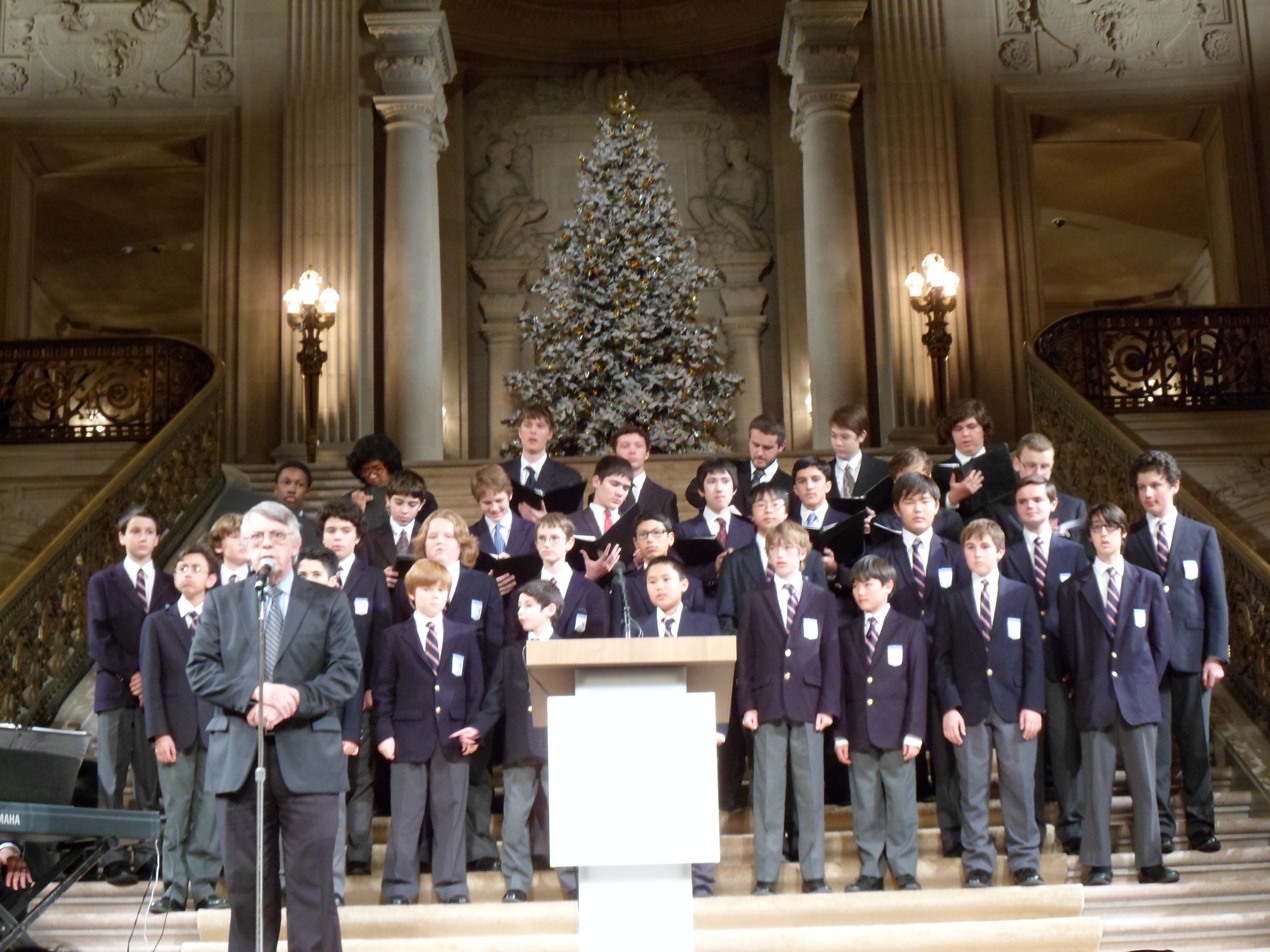
San Francisco Boy's Chorus

- KPIX-TV Channel 5, the first television station in Northern California and the first television station in the San Francisco Bay Area signs on the air in San Francisco

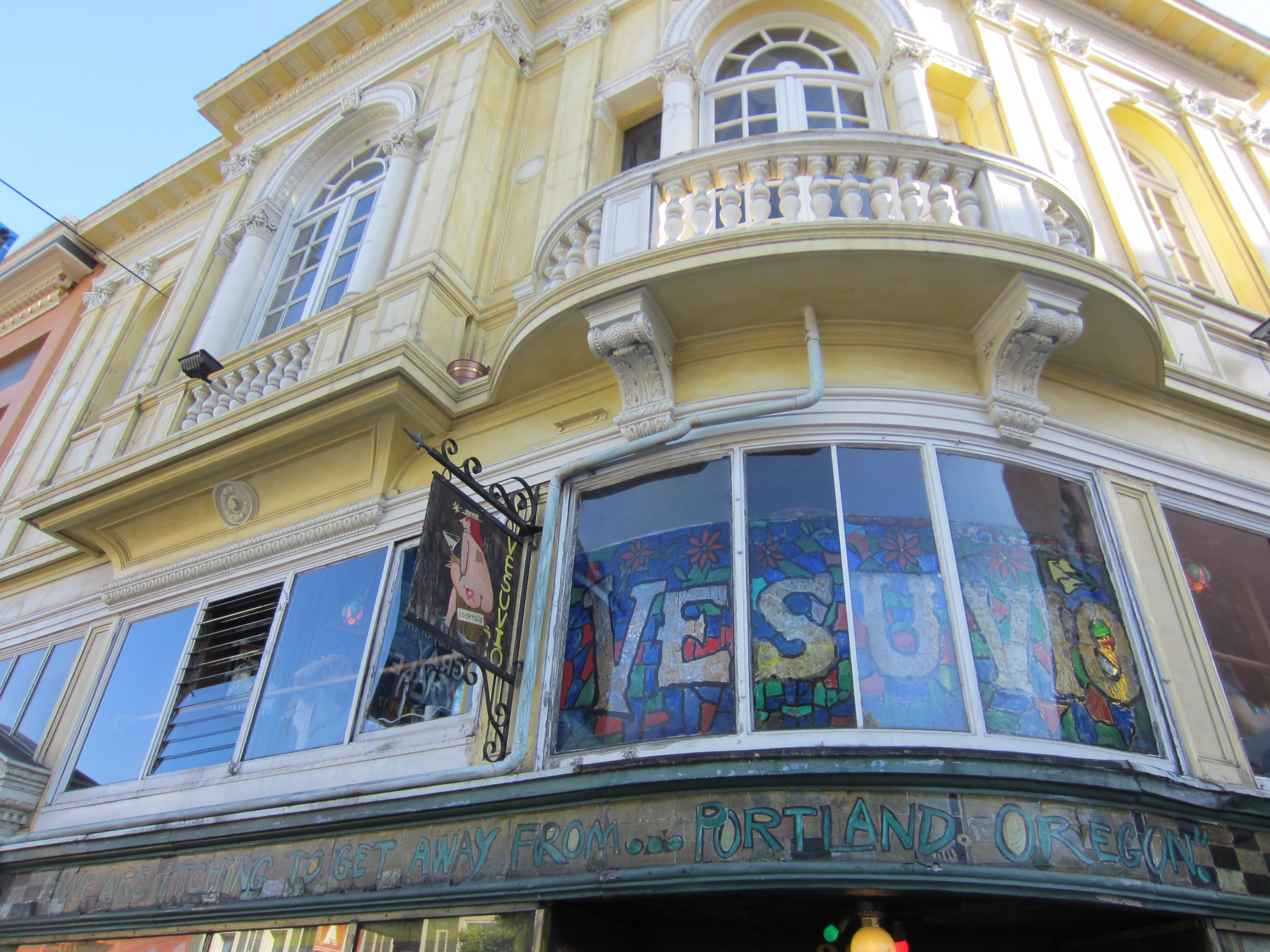
Vesuvio Cafe

• The Point Reyes Light weekly newspaper begins publishing in Marin County
• The San Francisco Boys Chorus (pictured) is formed
• Stanford University School of Humanities and Sciences is created from the merger of the Schools of Biological Sciences, Humanities, Physical Sciences and Social Sciences
• Beat Generation hangout Vesuvio Cafe (pictured) opens in San Francisco
• Westlake Shopping Center opens in Daly City
• Richard Diebenkorn has his first art exhibit at the California Palace of the Legion of Honor in San Francisco
• The Doggie Diner fast food restaurant opens in Oakland (later iconic doggie head pictured)

1949

Mervyns logo

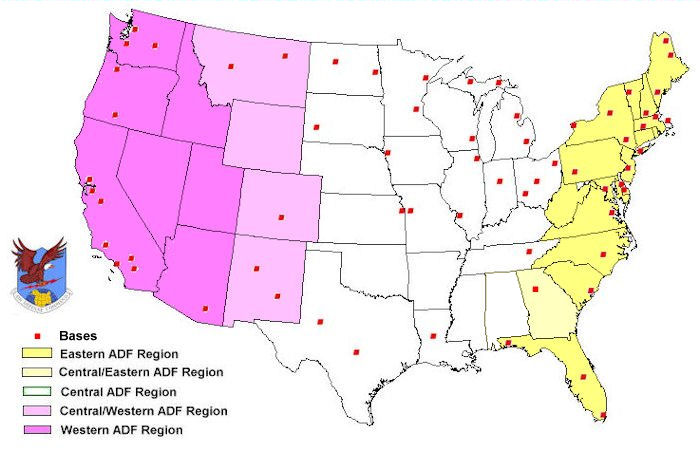
ADF regions (Western ADF in pink)

- KPFA community supported radio is founded in Berkeley
- KGO-TV Channel 7, the second television station in Northern California and the second television station in the San Francisco Bay Area signs on the air in San Francisco
- KRON-TV Channel 4, the third television station in Northern California and the second television station in the San Francisco Bay Area signs on the air in San Francisco
- East Contra Costa Junior College is founded in Pleasant Hill
- Fantasy Records is founded in San Francisco
- The first Mervyn's department store opens in San Lorenzo (contemporary logo pictured)
- The Western Air Defense Force (pictured) is established at the Hamilton Air Force Base in Marin County
- Berkelium is synthesized at the University of California, Berkeley
1950

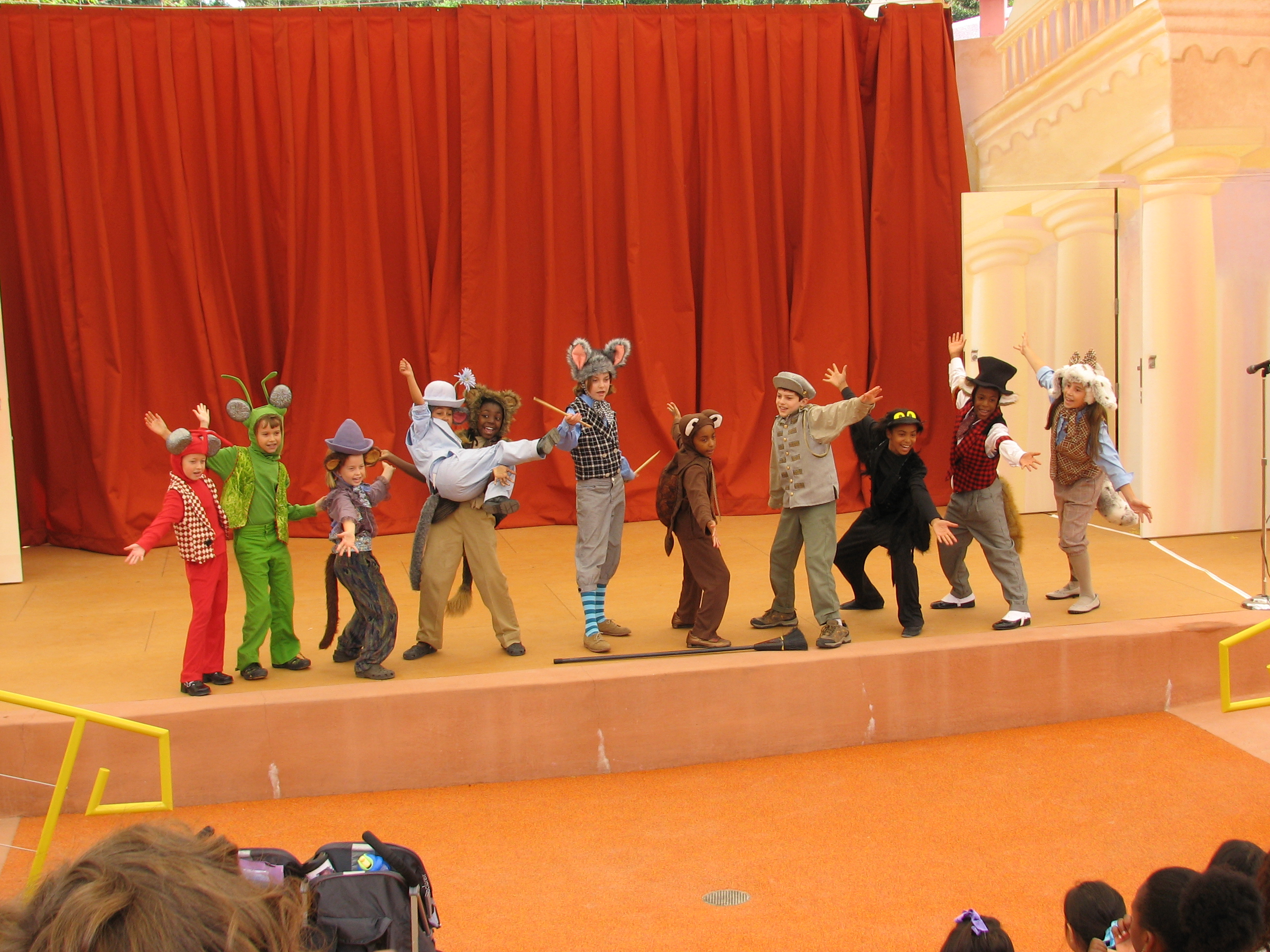
Contemporary performance at Children's Fairyland

- Children's Fairyland (child performance pictured) opens at Lake Merritt in Oakland
- Contra Costa College is established in San Pablo
- Californium is synthesized at the University of California, Berkeley
1951

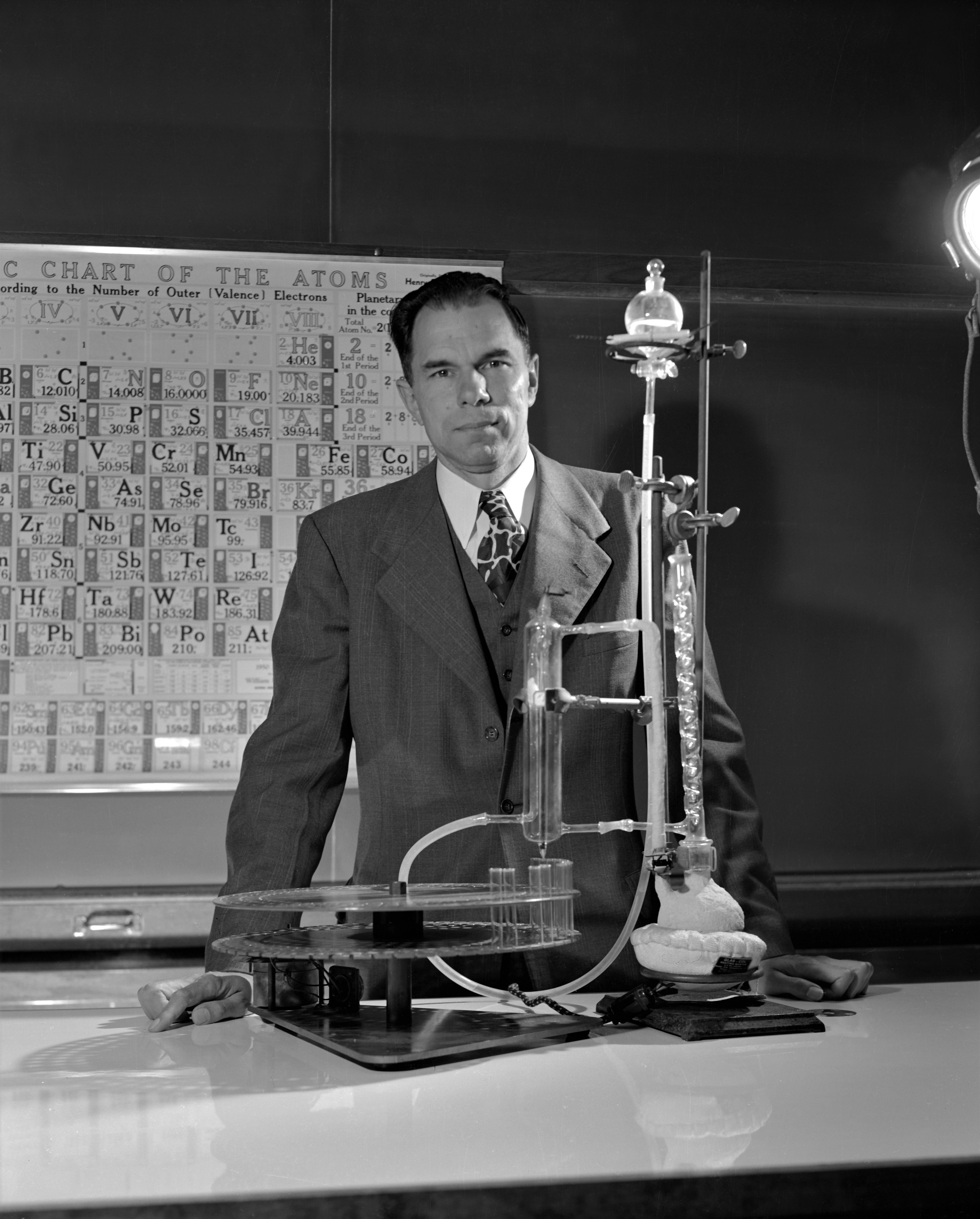

Yoshida signs San Francisco Peace Treaty

• The Treaty of San Francisco, between Japan and part of the Allied Powers, is officially signed by 48 nations at the War Memorial Opera House in San Francisco (signing pictured, right)
• Stanford Industrial Park in Palo Alto is completed
• A Trader Vic's opens in San Francisco
• Nuclear scientist Glenn T. Seaborg (pictured, left) at the University of California, Berkeley shares the Nobel Prize in Chemistry with Edwin McMillan for "discoveries in the chemistry of the transuranium elements."
• The USS Independence is scuttled near the Farallon Islands, after being used as a target for the Operation Crossroads nuclear test at Bikini Atoll

1952
- The Purple Onion nightclub opens in San Francisco
- Dwinelle Hall is completed at the University of California, Berkeley
- Lawrence Livermore National Laboratory (pictured) is established in Livermore
- Russ Harvey adds hamburgers to the menu of his San Pablo hot dog stand, and renames it Harvey's Giant Hamburgers
1953

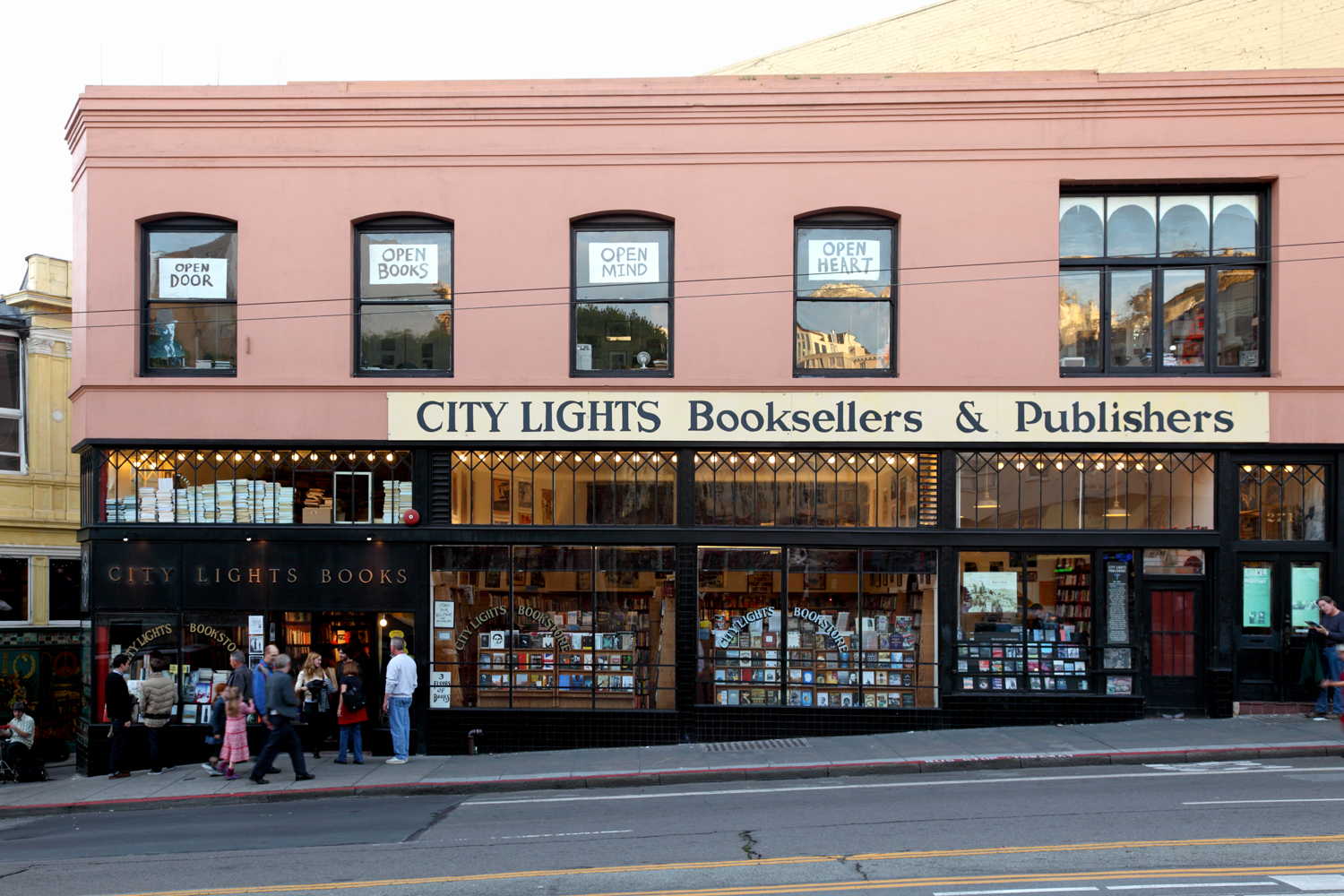
City Lights

- Poet Lawrence Ferlinghetti's City Lights Bookstore (pictured) opens in San Francisco
- Johnny Kan opens an early "open kitchen" Chinese restaurant in San Francisco
- Laney College is established in Oakland
- The Survey of California and Other Indian Languages begins publication at the University of California, Berkeley
1954

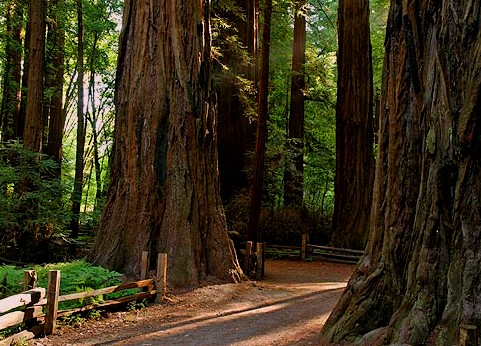
The Redwood Grove Trail (old-growth loop) in Henry Cowell Redwoods State Park

- Merritt College is established in Oakland
- Henry Cowell Redwoods State Park (pictured) is established in the Santa Cruz Mountains
- KQED (TV) Channel 9, the fourth television station in Northern California and the fourth television station in the San Francisco Bay Area signs on the air in Berkeley, California
- Brookside Hospital opens in San Pablo
1955

Ginsberg signature

Cupertino flag

- Howl, by Allen Ginsberg (signature pictured), is written, then recited at the Six Gallery reading in San Francisco
- The California Medical Facility, a state prison in Vacaville, opens
- Cazadero Performing Arts Camp is established in western Sonoma County
- The city of Cupertino (flag pictured) is incorporated in Santa Clara County
- Daughters of Bilitis, the first lesbian civil and political rights organization in the United States, is formed in San Francisco
- KNTV Channel 11, the first television station in San Jose, California signs on the air
- Newark is incorporated in Alameda County
1956

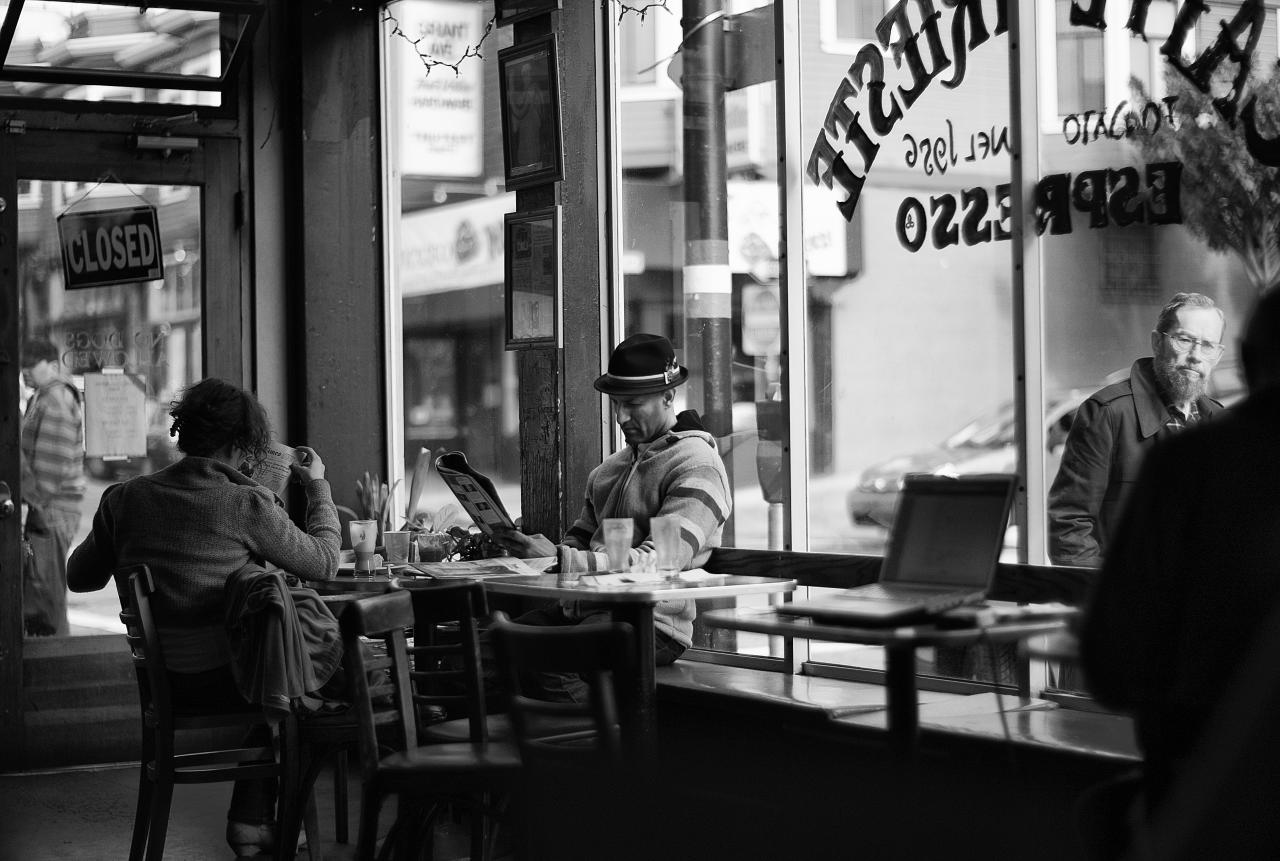
Caffe Trieste interior

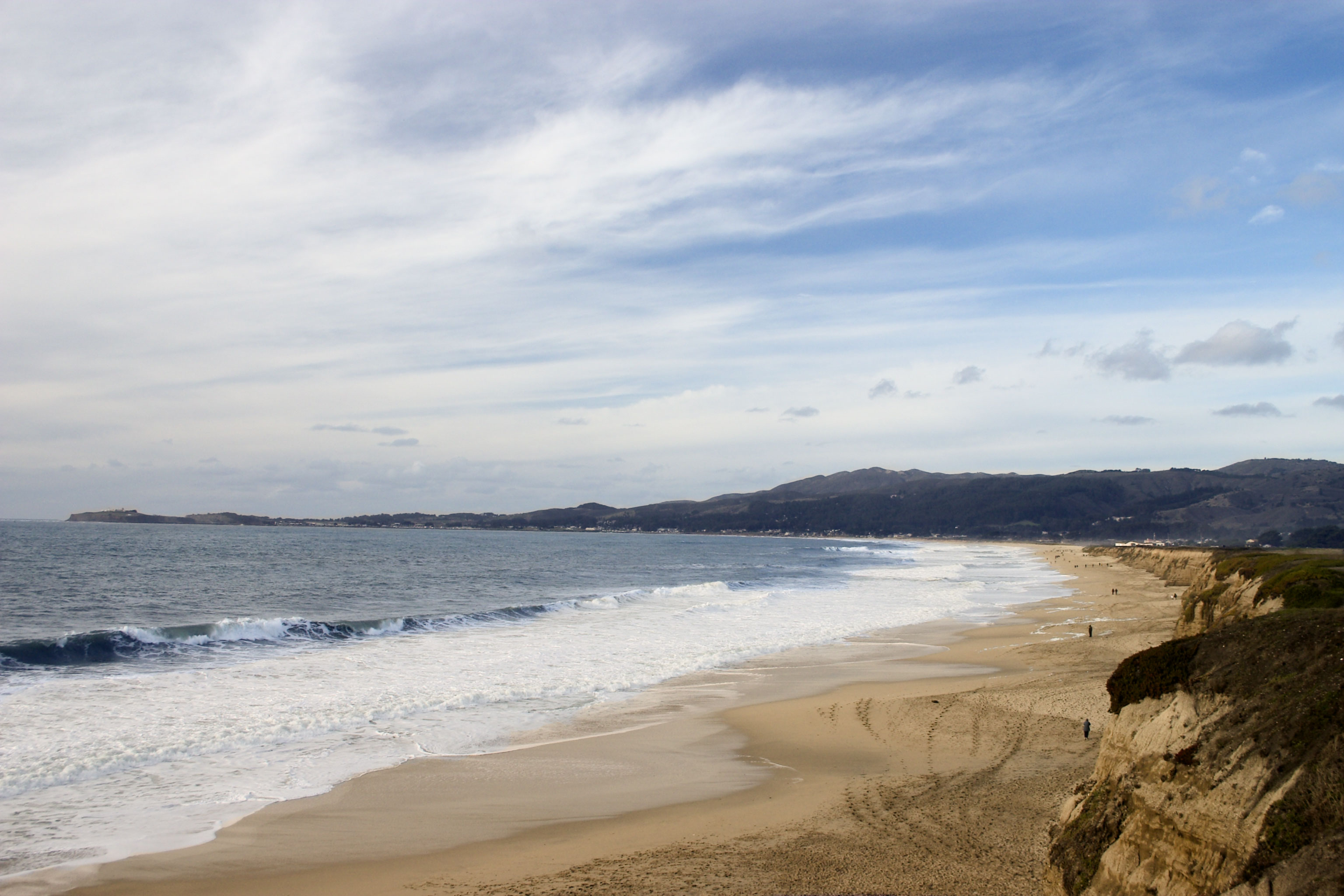
Half Moon Bay State Beach

- Caffe Trieste (pictured) opens in San Francisco
- The Republican National Convention is held at the Cow Palace in San Francisco
- The Argonaut ceases publication in San Francisco
- Half Moon Bay State Beach (pictured) is established in San Mateo County
- The Hayward Area Historical Society is founded
- Williams Sonoma opens its first store in Sonoma
- George Christopher is elected mayor of San Francisco
- While living with poet Gary Snyder outside Mill Valley, Jack Kerouac works on a book centering on Snyder, which he considers calling Visions of Gary
1957

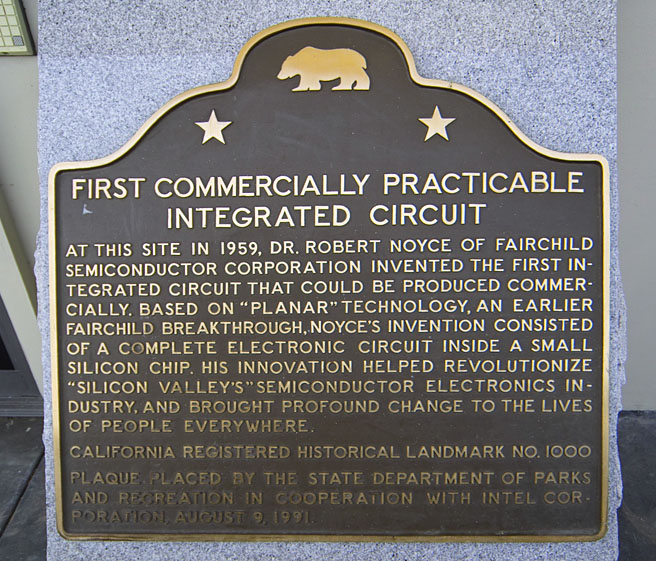
Commemorative plaque to the Fairchild team

- The San Francisco International Film Festival is founded
- Fairchild Semiconductor (historic plaque pictured) is founded in San Jose
- The State College for Alameda County is founded in Hayward
- The Flower Drum Song (the basis of 1958 musical Flower Drum Song) by C. Y. Lee, is published
- The Kingston Trio folk music group forms in San Francisco
- Pacifica is incorporated in San Mateo County
1958
- KTVU Channel 2 signs on the air in Oakland, California

SF Giants logo

- Rice-A-Roni, "The San Francisco Treat", is introduced
- The first Cost Plus store opens at Fisherman's Wharf in San Francisco
- The New York Giants move to San Francisco and become the San Francisco Giants (logo pictured)
- San Francisco columnist Herb Caen coins the term Beatnik, adding the suffix "-nik" from Sputnik I to the Beat Generation, or "Beats"
1959

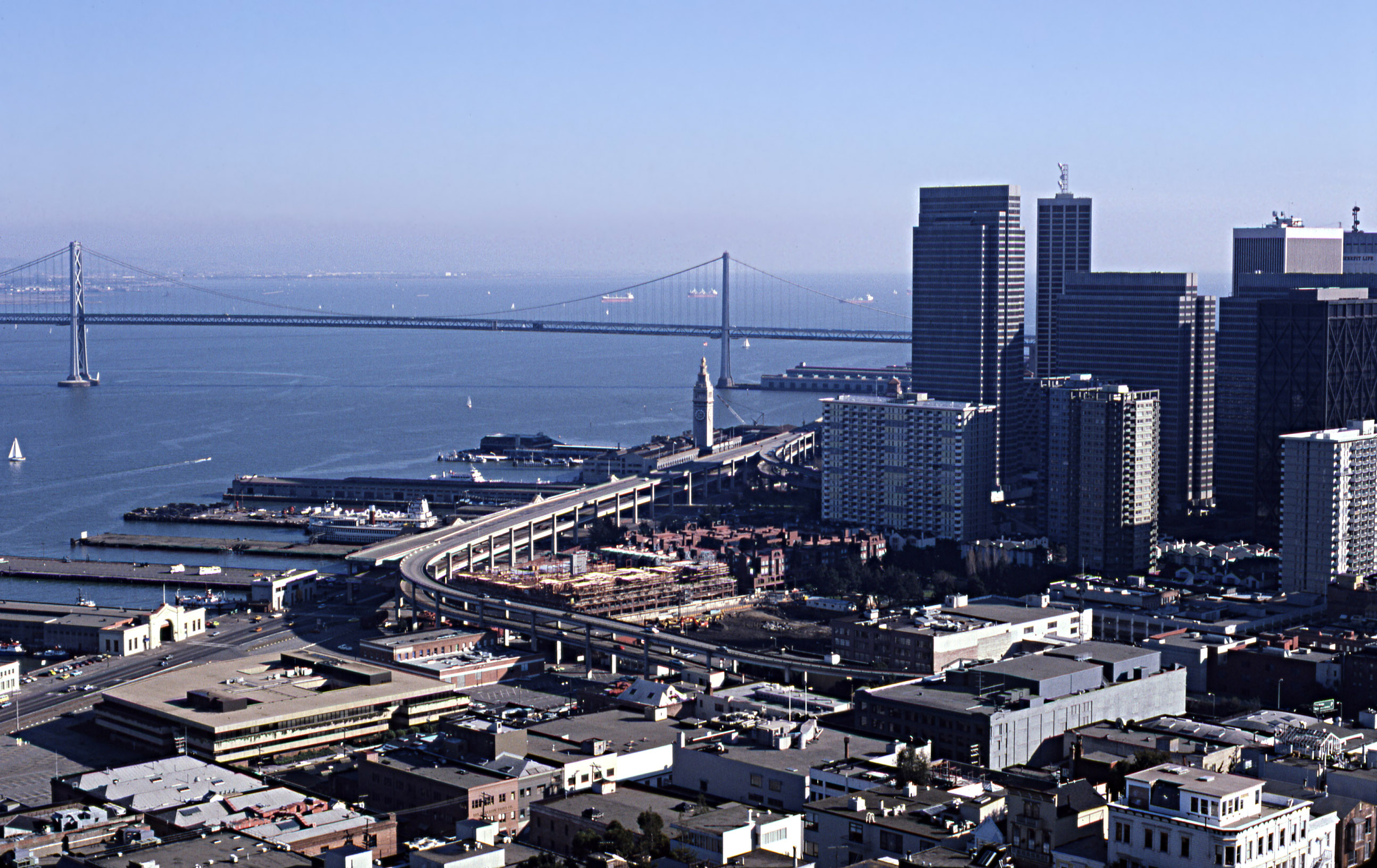
Embarcadero Freeway

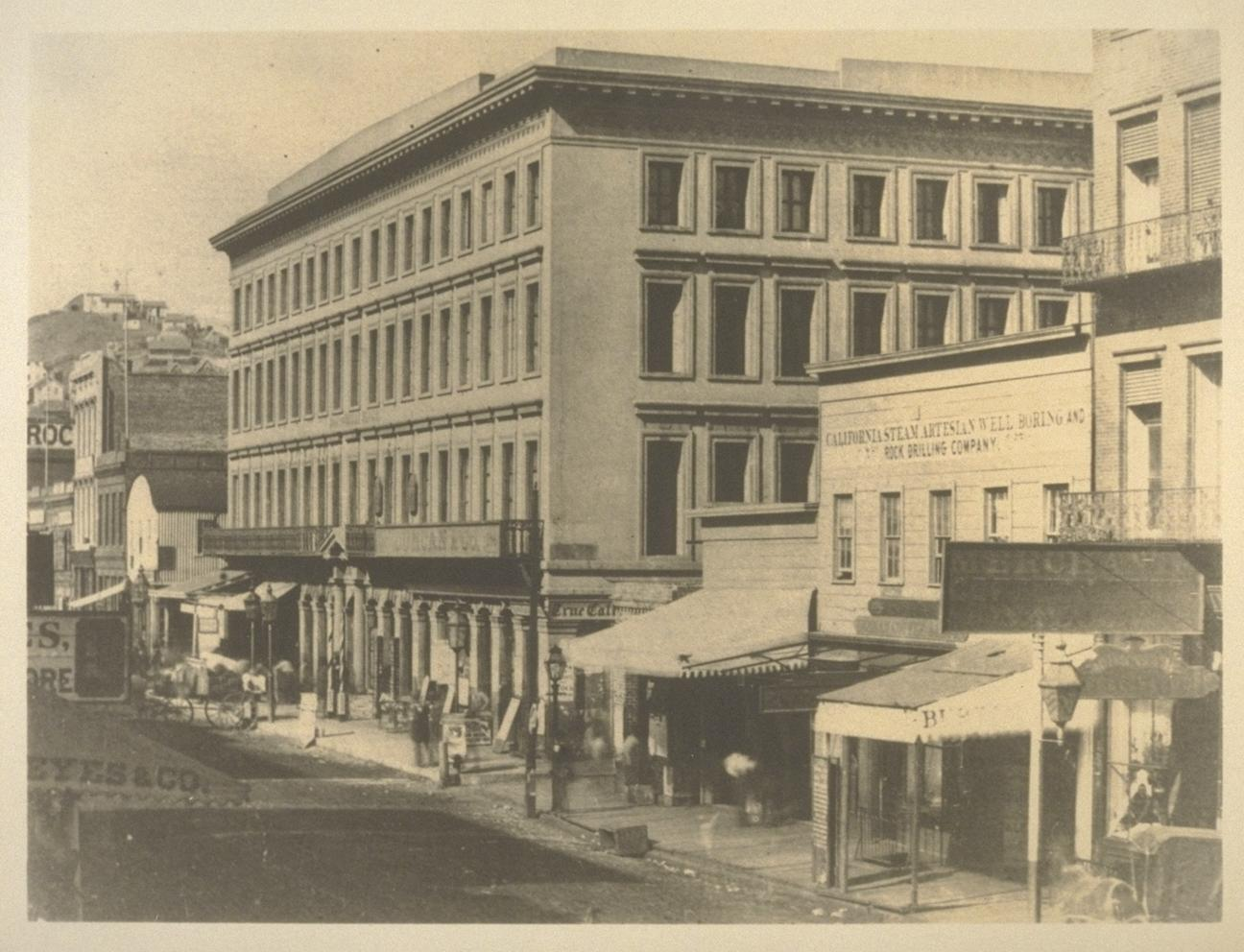
Montgomery Block, 1862

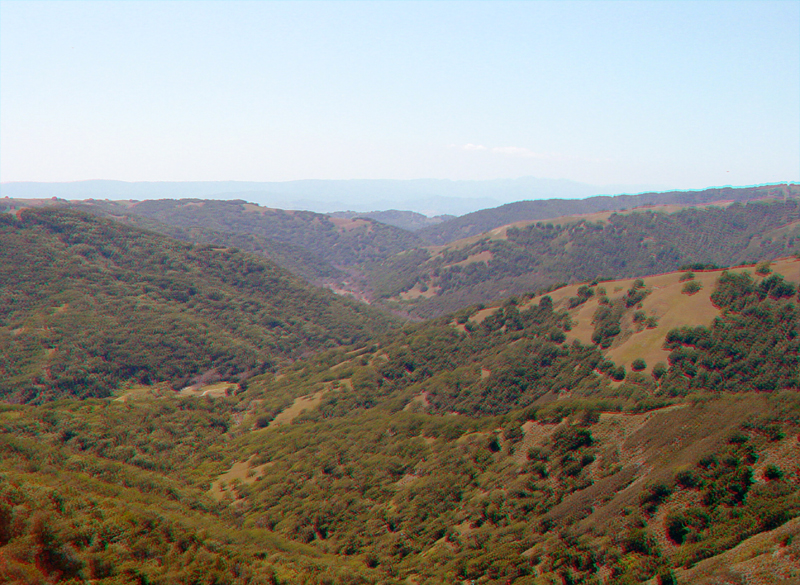
Henry Coe skyline

- The Embarcadero Freeway (pictured) opens in San Francisco, the same year the San Francisco Board of Supervisors votes to cancel seven of ten planned freeways
- The Montgomery Block building (pictured) in San Francisco is demolished
- Henry W. Coe State Park (pictured), in the Diablo Range in Santa Clara and Stanislaus counties, is established
- Jack London State Historic Park, on the eastern slope of Sonoma Mountain, is established
- The Crown-Zellerbach Building in San Francisco is completed
- The San Francisco Mime Troupe is formed in San Francisco, performing (despite its name) musical political satire
- Union City is established in Alameda County
- Owen Chamberlain and Emilio Segrè at the University of California, Berkeley are awarded the Nobel Prize in Physics for their discovery of the antiproton
1960

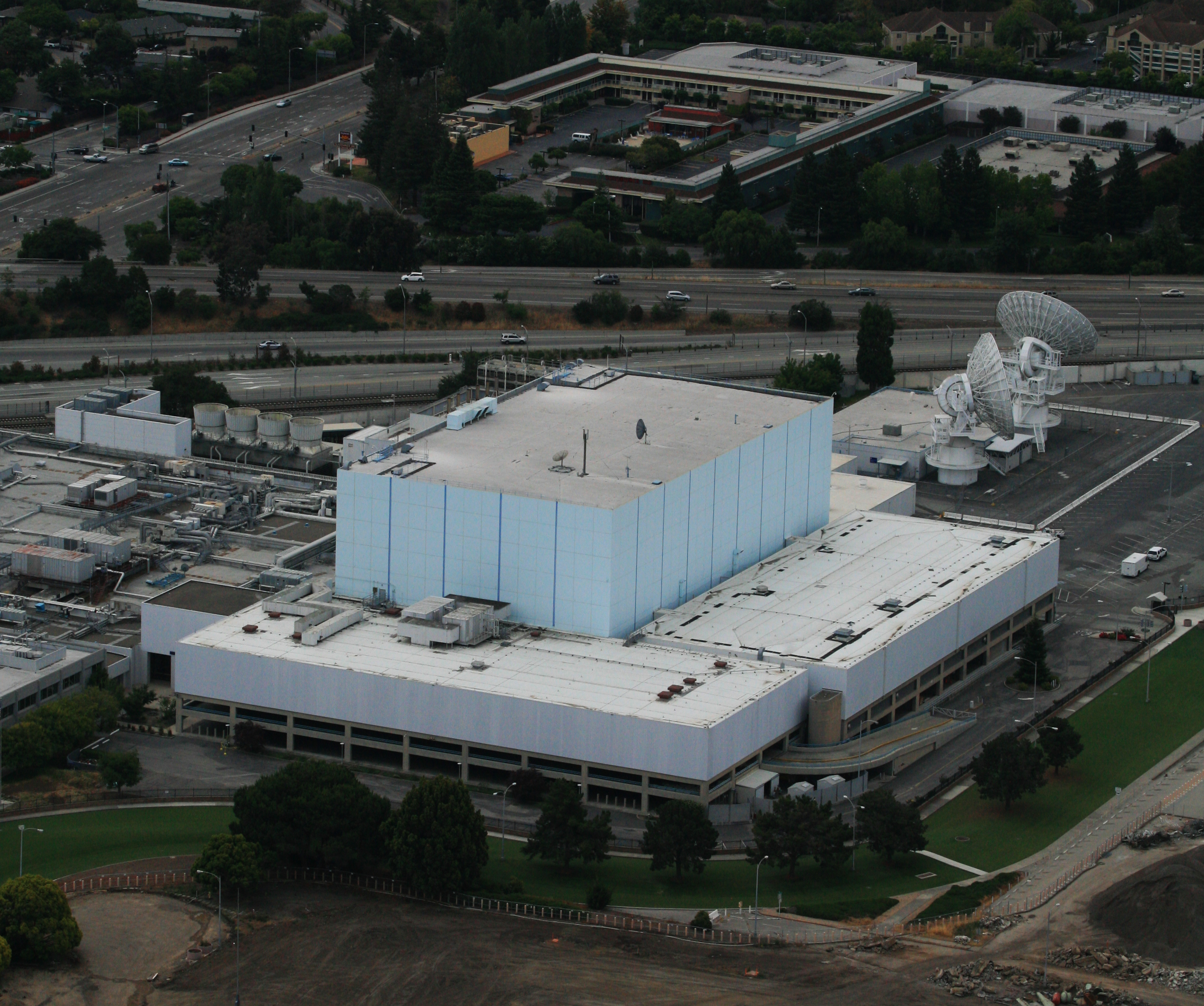
The "Blue Cube"

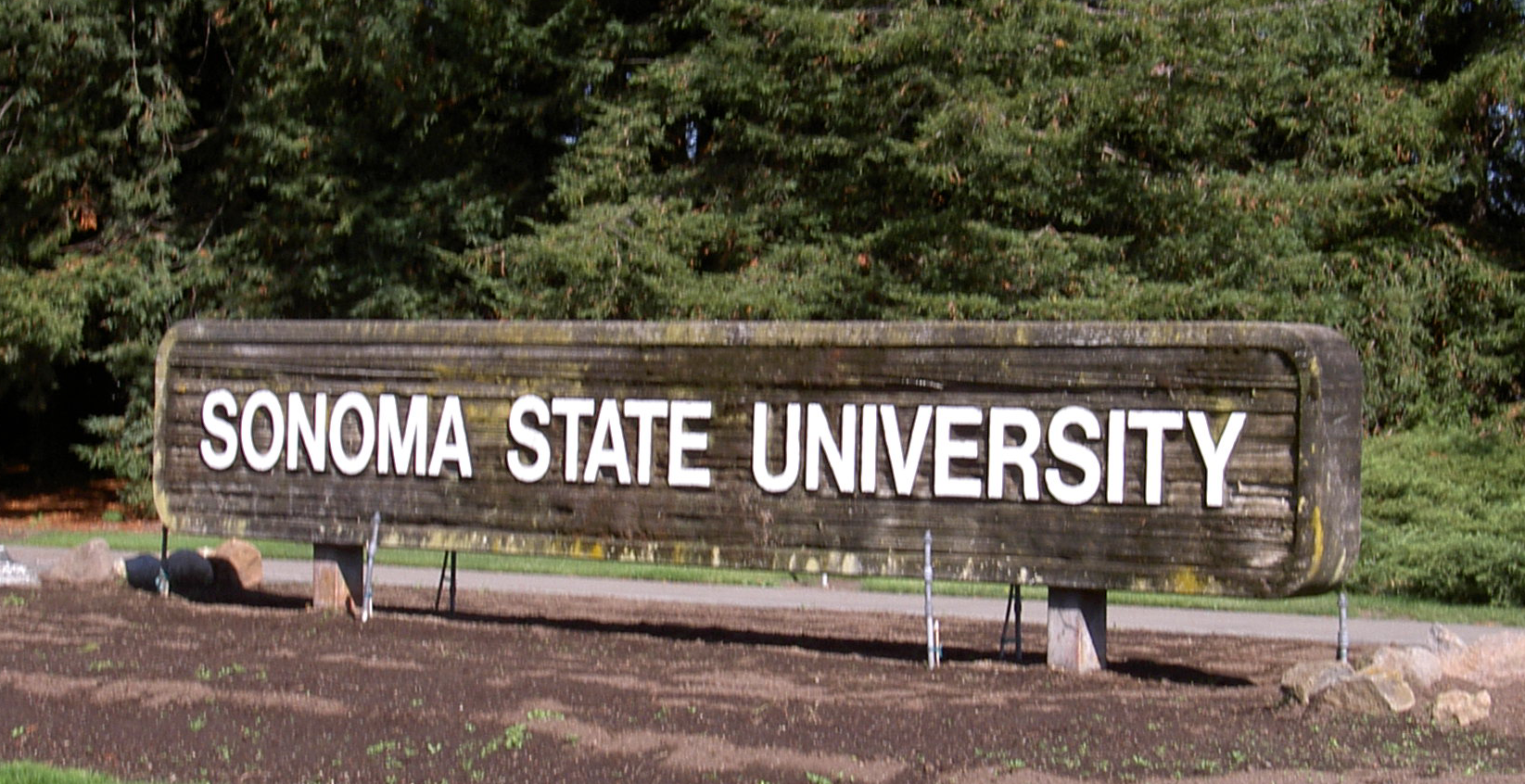
SSU sign

- George Miller is re-elected to California's 8th congressional district
- Bothe-Napa Valley State Park is established
- Candlestick Park opens in San Francisco
- The Air Force Satellite Test Center (pictured), in Santa Clara County, becomes operational
- Sonoma State University (pictured) is established
- Donald A. Glaser at the University of California, Berkeley is awarded the Nobel Prize in Physics for his invention of the bubble chamber
- San Jose's population is 204,196, an increase by 114% from 1950's 95,280
- Alameda-Contra Costa Transit District (AC Transit) begins service in October.
1961

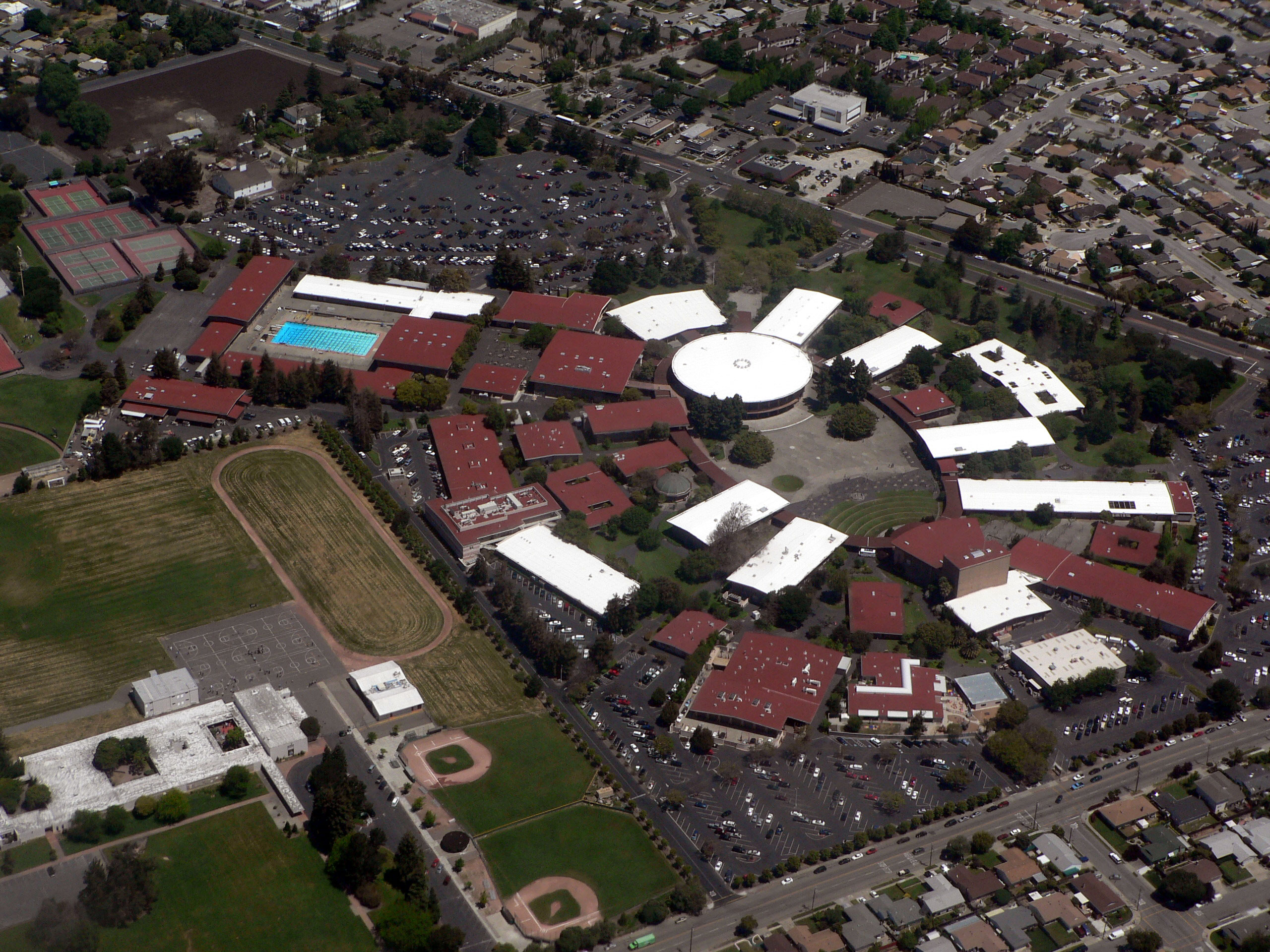
Aerial photograph of Chabot College

- The Moore Dry Dock Company in Oakland ceases operations
- Chabot College (pictured) is established in Hayward
- The Frontier Village amusement park in San Jose opens
- Melvin Calvin of the University of California, Berkeley, Andrew Benson and James Bassham are awarded the Nobel Prize in Chemistry for their discovery of the Calvin cycle
1962

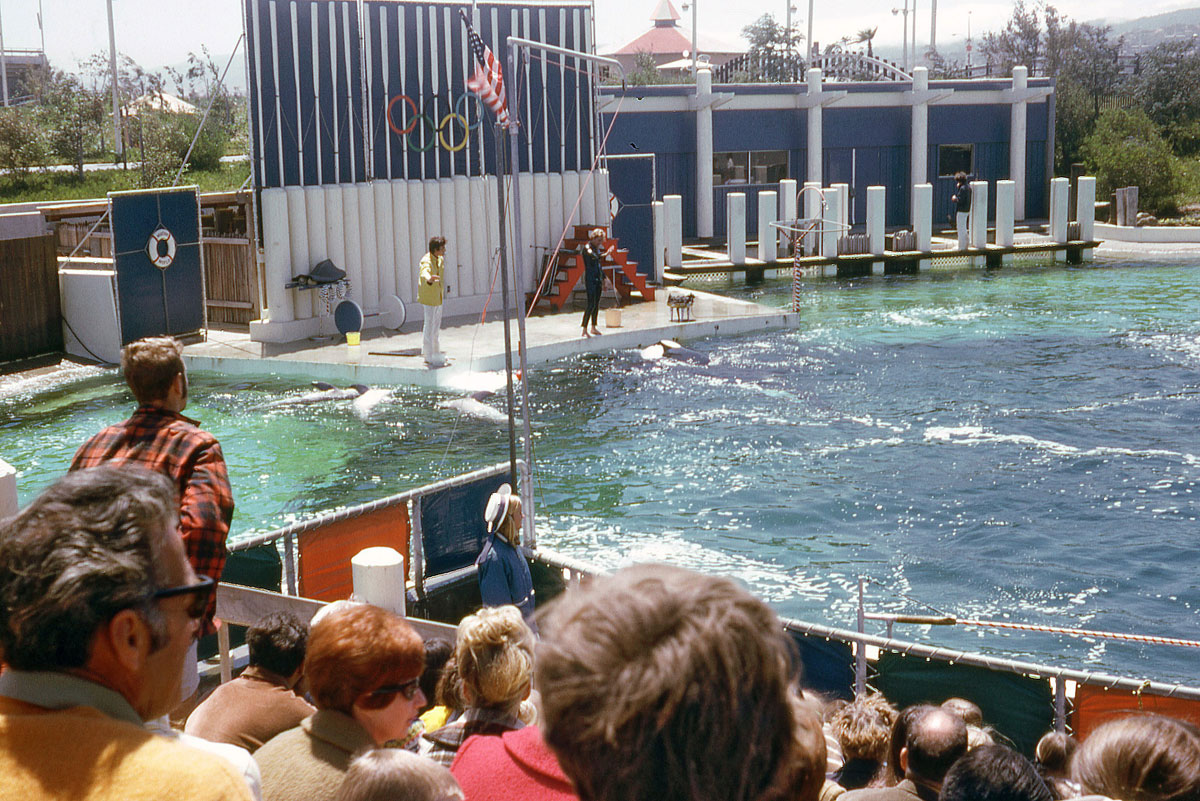
Marine World show, 1970

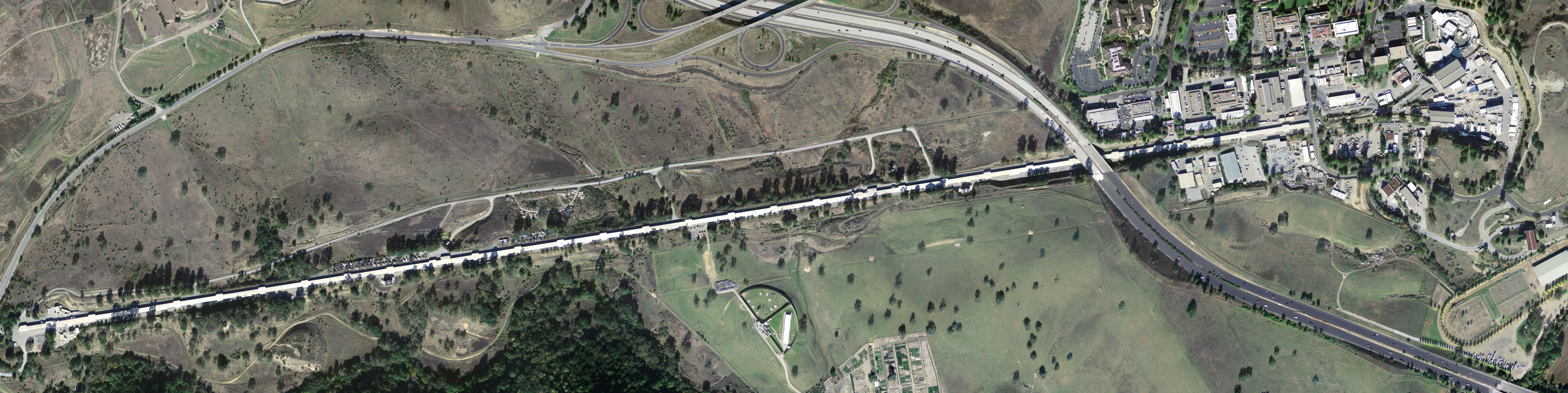
Stanford Linear Accelerator

- Marine World (pictured) opens in Redwood Shores
- Ramparts, a left-wing political and literary magazine, is founded in Menlo Park
- The Stanford Linear Accelerator Center (pictured) is established in Menlo Park
- Sproul Plaza is completed at the University of California, Berkeley
- General Motors' Fremont Assembly plant opens
1963

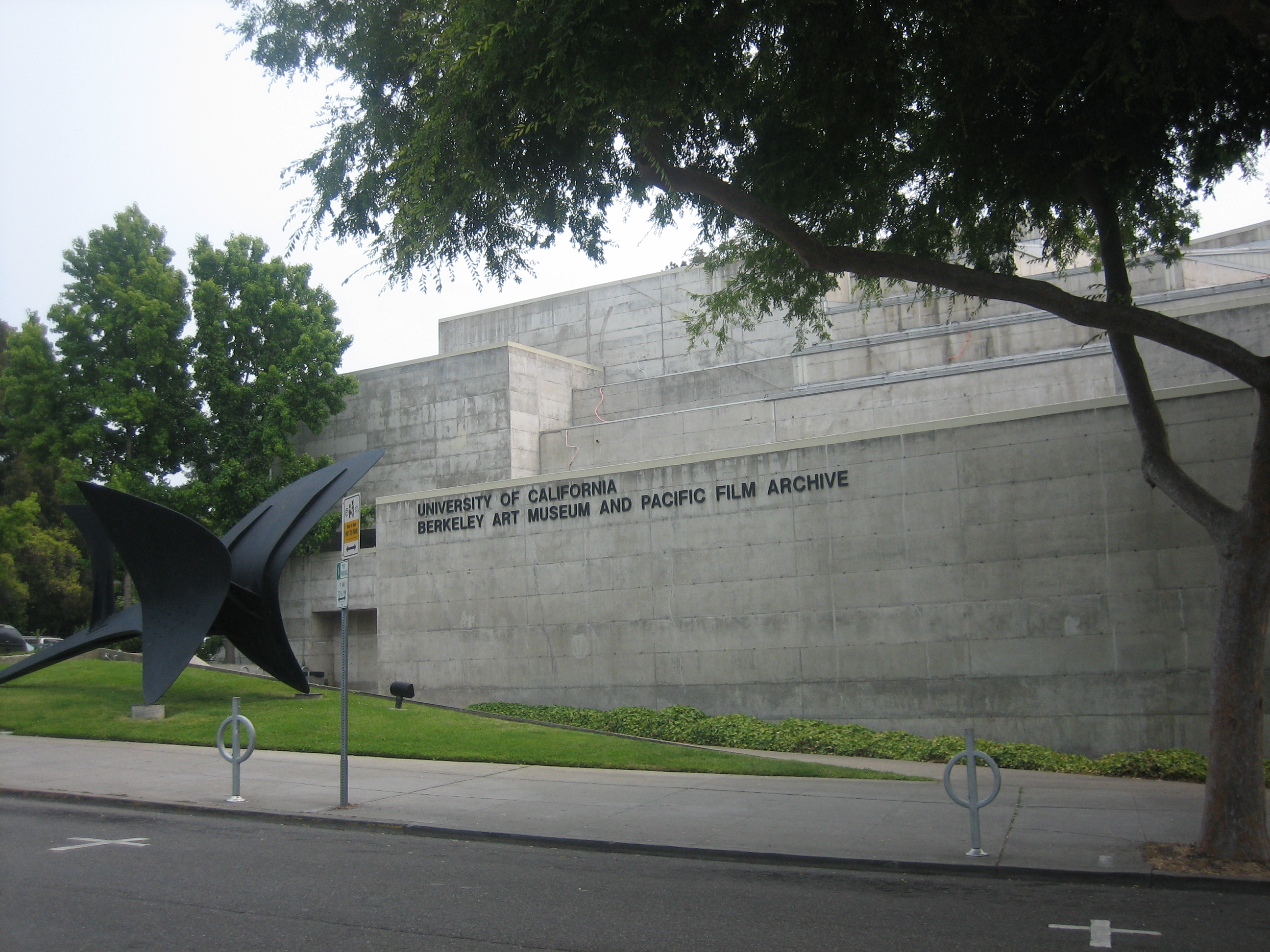
Contemporary BAM/PFA building

- The Berkeley Art Museum and Pacific Film Archive (pictured) is founded
- The Committee improvisational theatre group is formed in San Francisco
- The Reverend Cecil Williams becomes pastor of Glide Memorial Church in San Francisco
- General Motors Oakland Assembly closes
1964

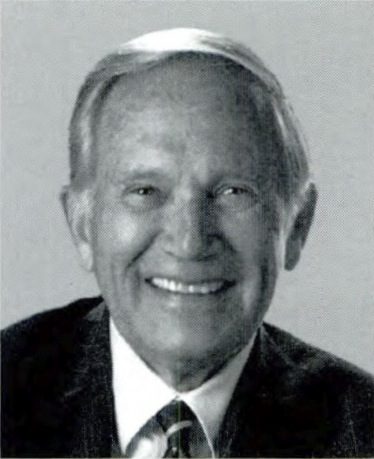
Don Edwards

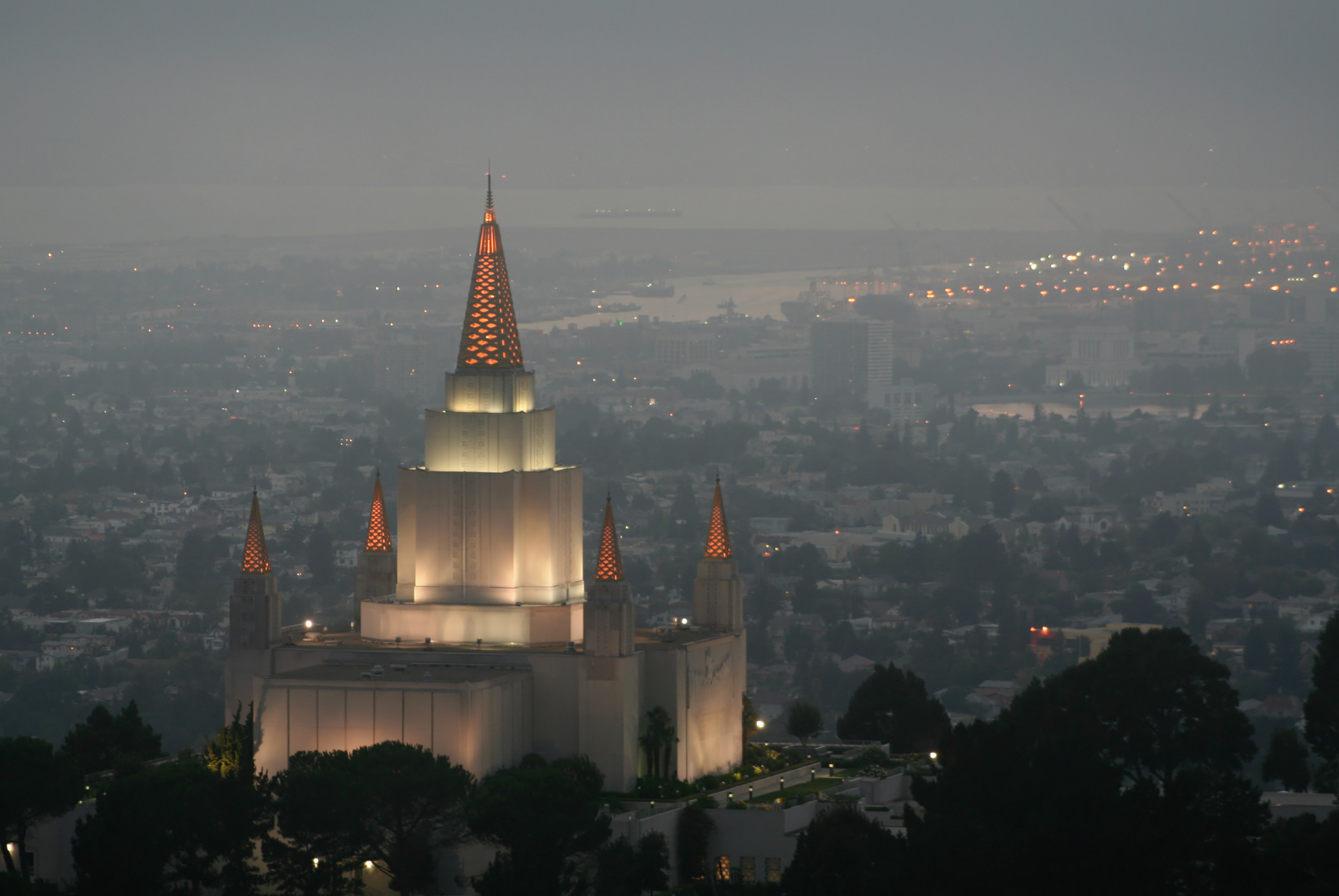
Oakland Temple

- The Republican National Convention is held at the Cow Palace, San Francisco
- The Christmas flood hits Sonoma County
- The Free Speech Movement begins at the University of California, Berkeley
- Pacific Air Lines Flight 773 crashes near San Ramon after a gunman kills the pilot and co-pilot, with no survivors
- Don Edwards (pictured) is elected to California's 9th congressional district
- The Oakland California Temple (pictured) of the Church of Jesus Christ of Latter-day Saints is completed
1965

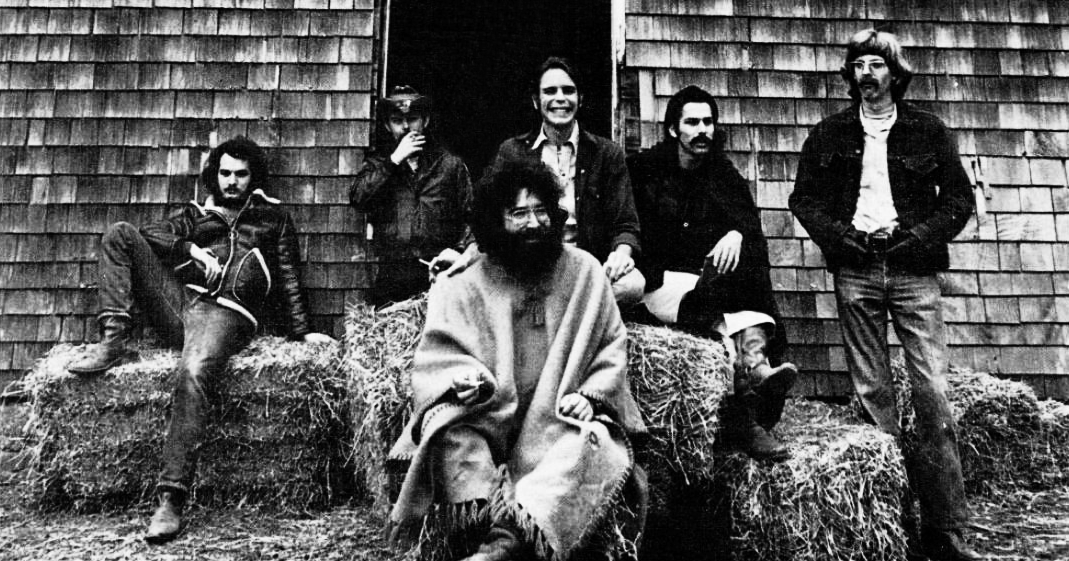
Grateful Dead

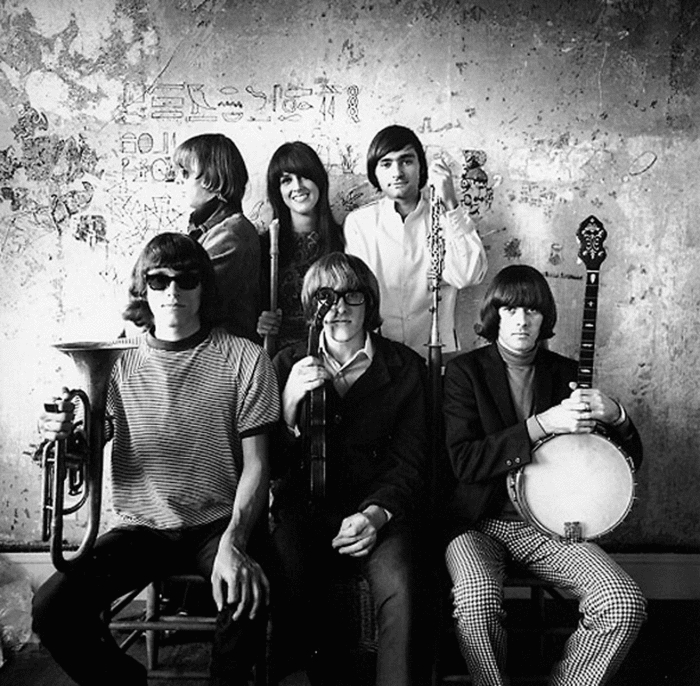
Jefferson Airplane

- The Grateful Dead (pictured) forms in Palo Alto
- Jefferson Airplane (pictured) forms in San Francisco
- The Acid Tests begin to be given by author and Merry Prankster Ken Kesey in the San Francisco Bay Area and across the West Coast
- Condominium 1 is built at Sea Ranch on the Sonoma County coast
- The San Francisco Bay Conservation and Development Commission is created to protect and preserve the San Francisco Bay
1966

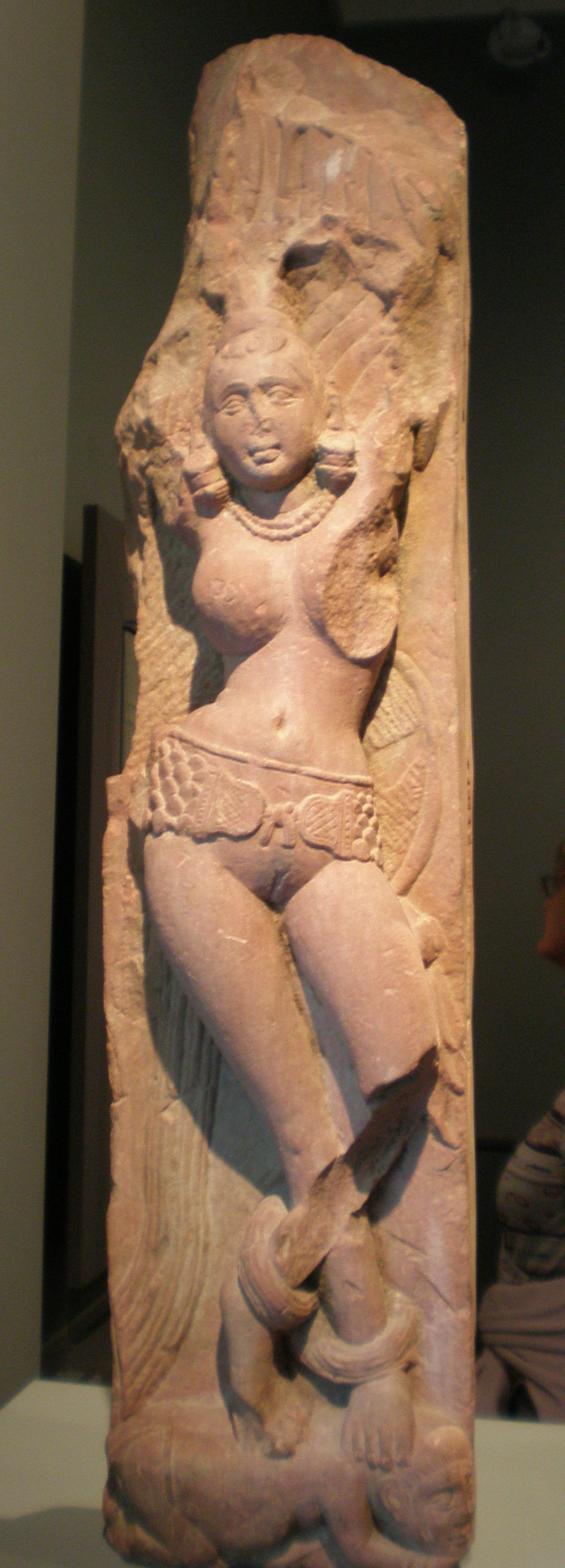
Railing pillar with female figure, Asian Art Museum

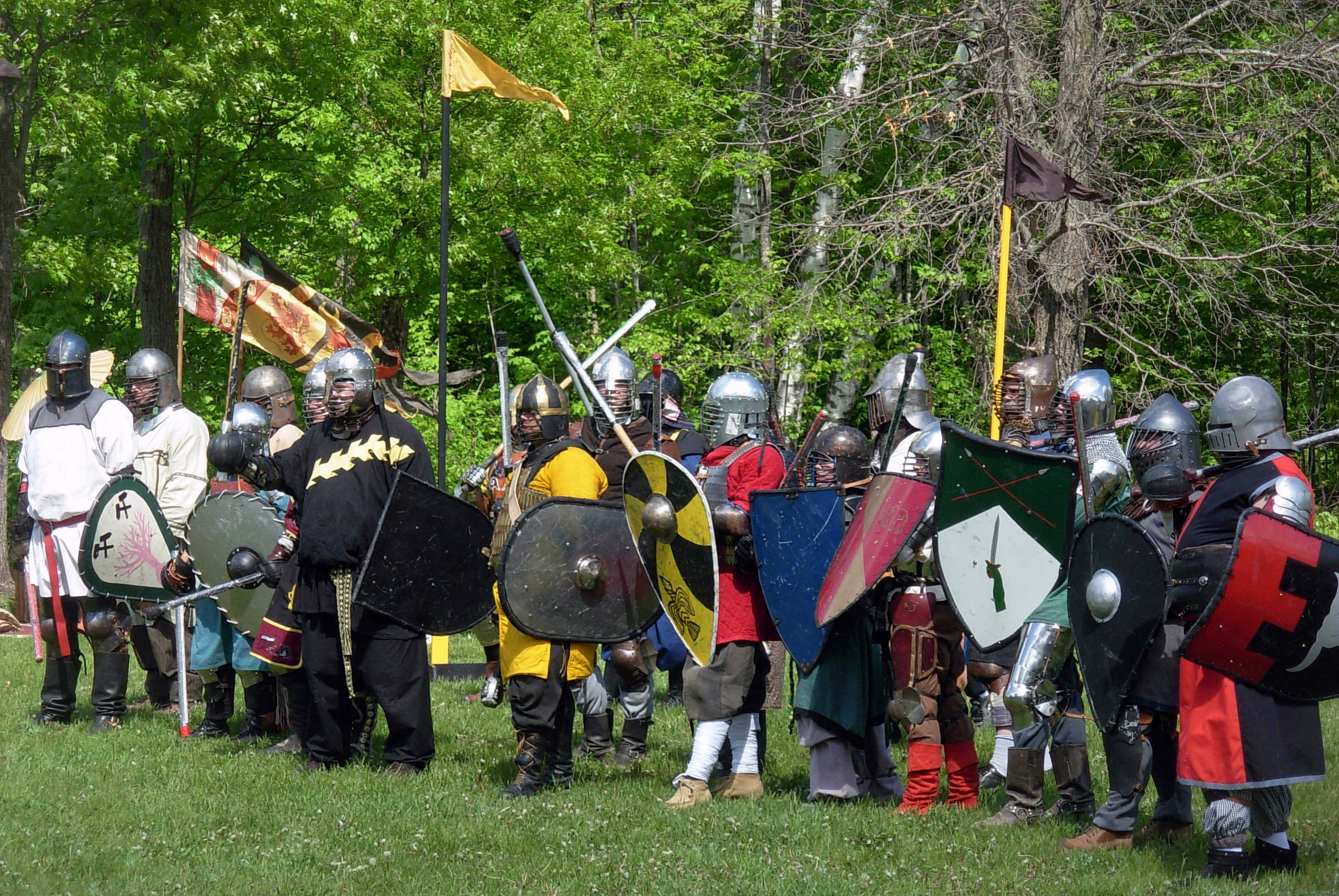
SCA participants

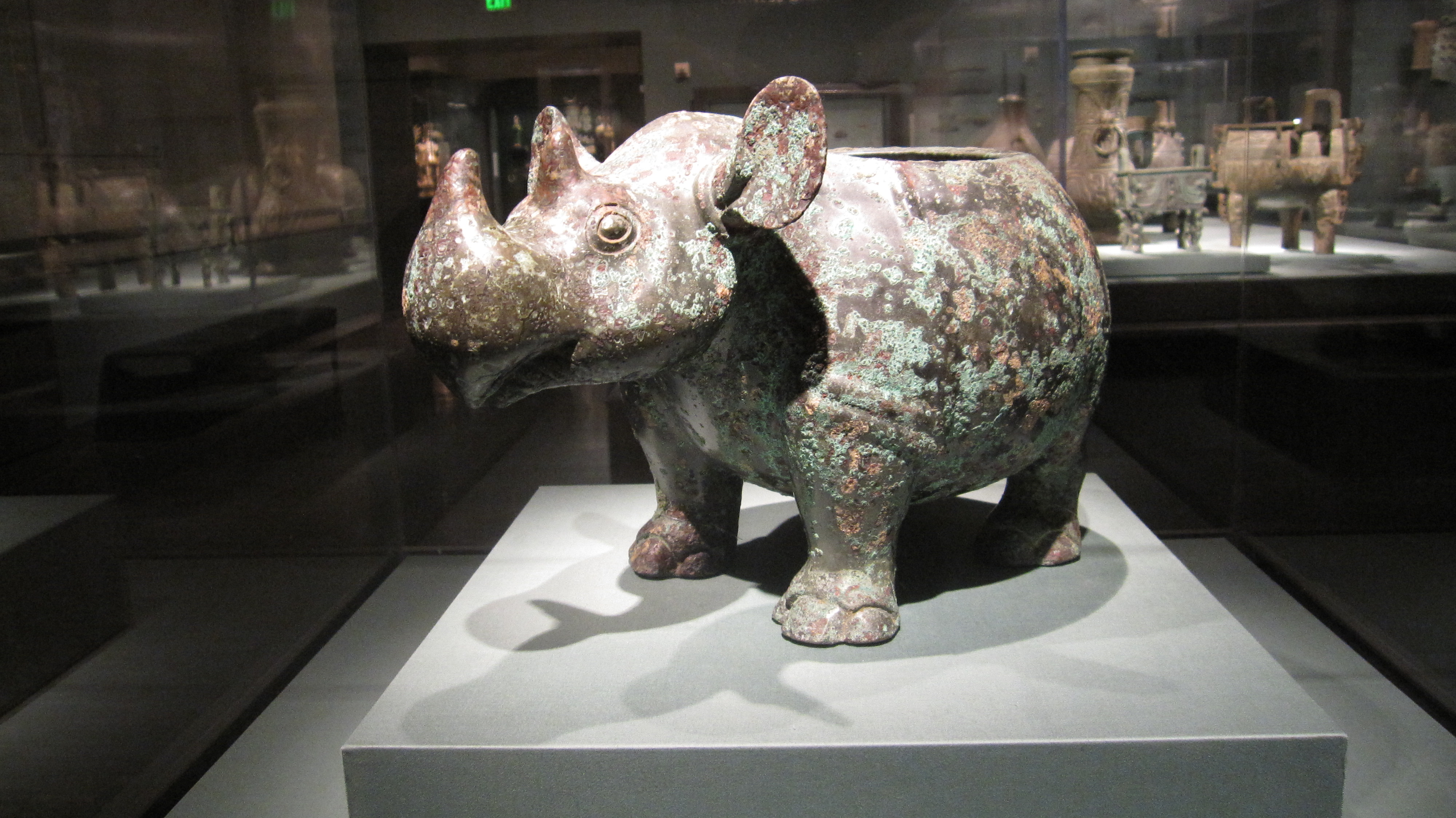
Zun in shape of rhinoceros, China, 1100s–1050 BCE

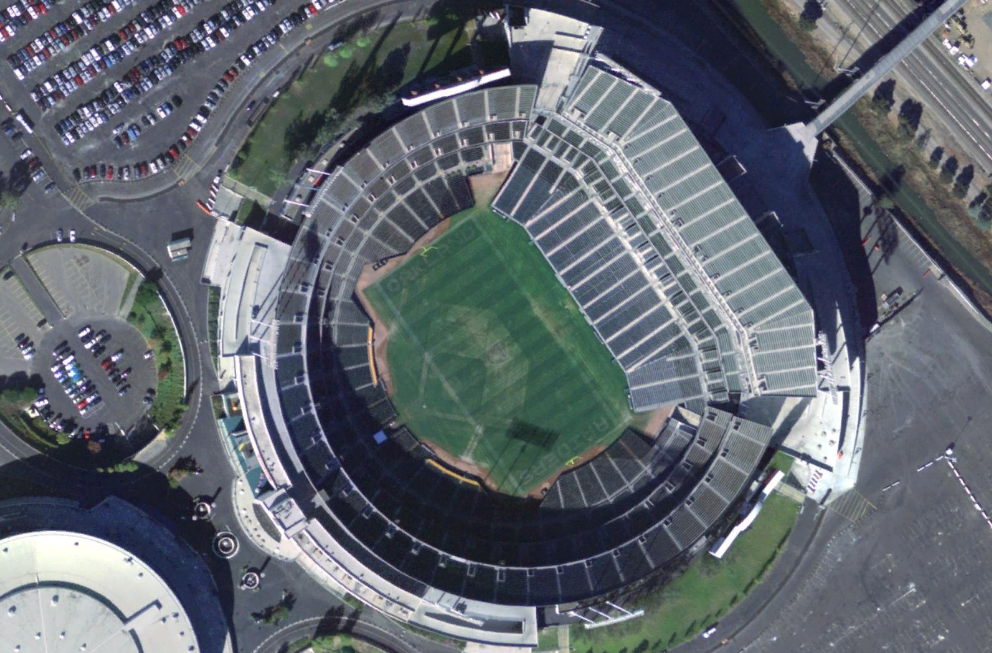
Satellite photograph of the Oakland Coliseum

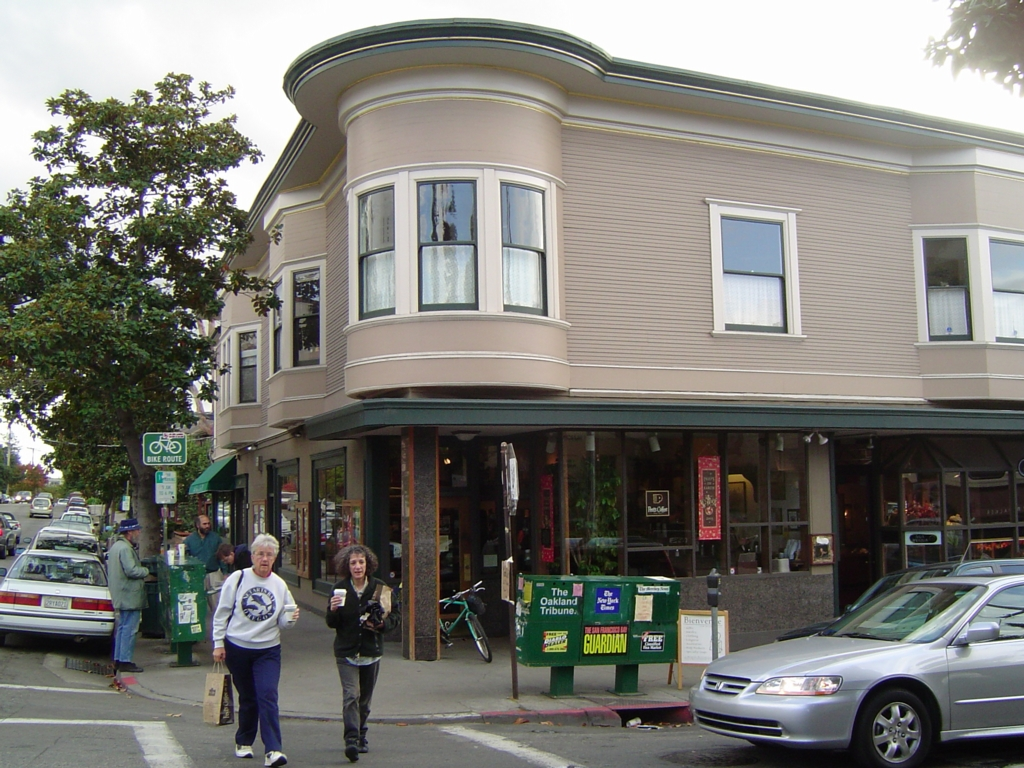
The original Peet's Coffee, Berkeley

• The Love Pageant Rally is held, on the day LSD becomes illegal, in Golden Gate Park, by the creators of the San Francisco Oracle
• The Society for Creative Anachronism (pictured) forms in Berkeley, with a parade down Telegraph Avenue
• George Paul Miller is re-elected to California's 8th congressional district
• The Asian Art Museum of San Francisco (artifacts pictured) opens as a wing of the M. H. de Young Memorial Museum in Golden Gate Park
• High-end clothier Wilkes Bashford opens in Union Square, San Francisco
• The Black Panther Party for Self-Defense is formed in Oakland by Huey Newton and Bobby Seale
• Moby Grape is formed in San Francisco by Skip Spence and Matthew Katz
• The Oakland Coliseum (pictured) opens
• Peet's Coffee & Tea (pictured) is founded in Berkeley
• The Print Mint begins publishing and distributing posters and underground comics in Berkeley
• The San Francisco Bay Guardian weekly alternative newspaper is founded in San Francisco
• The American Conservatory Theater moves to San Francisco

1967

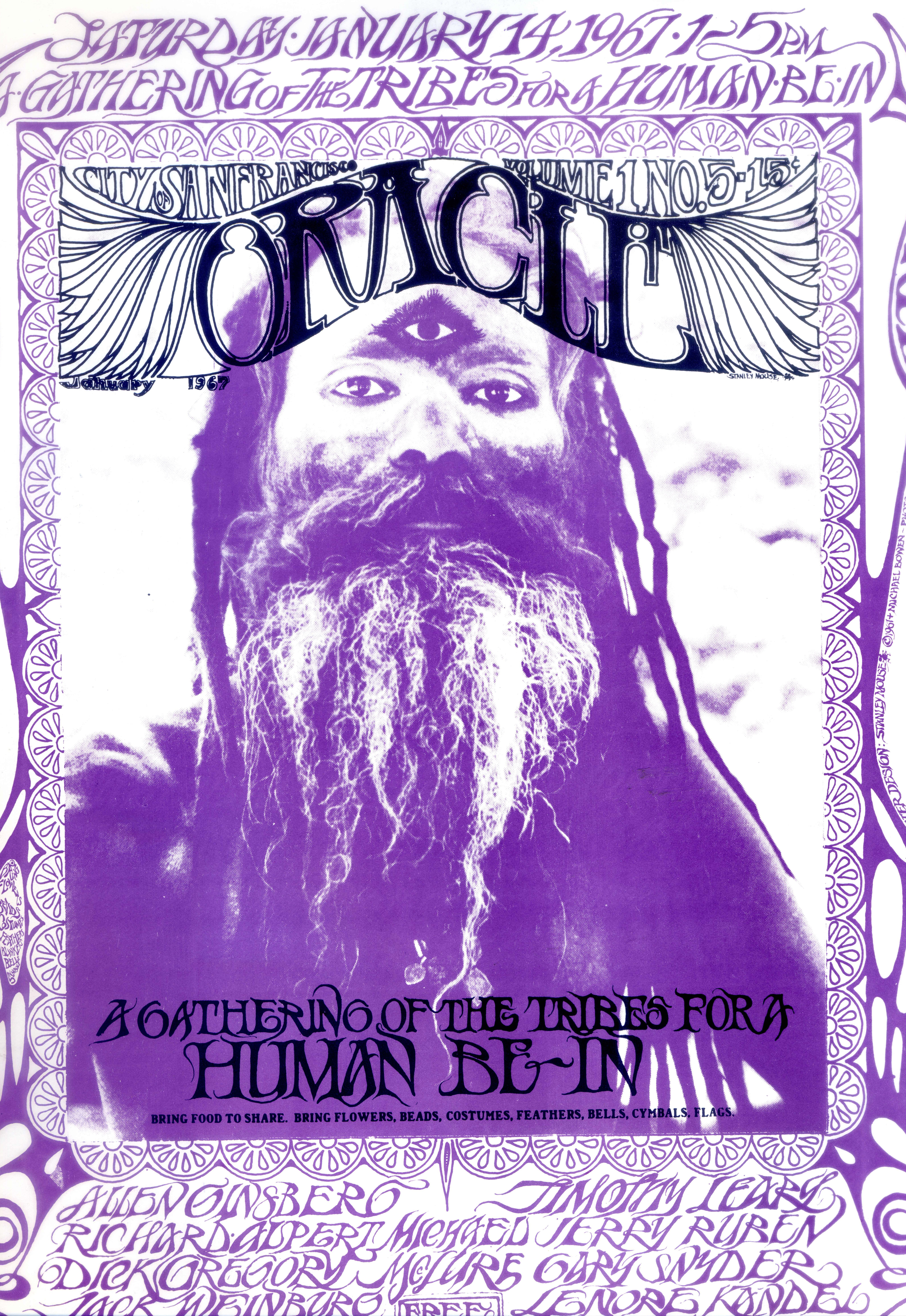
Human Be-In poster reprinted for the San Francisco Oracle

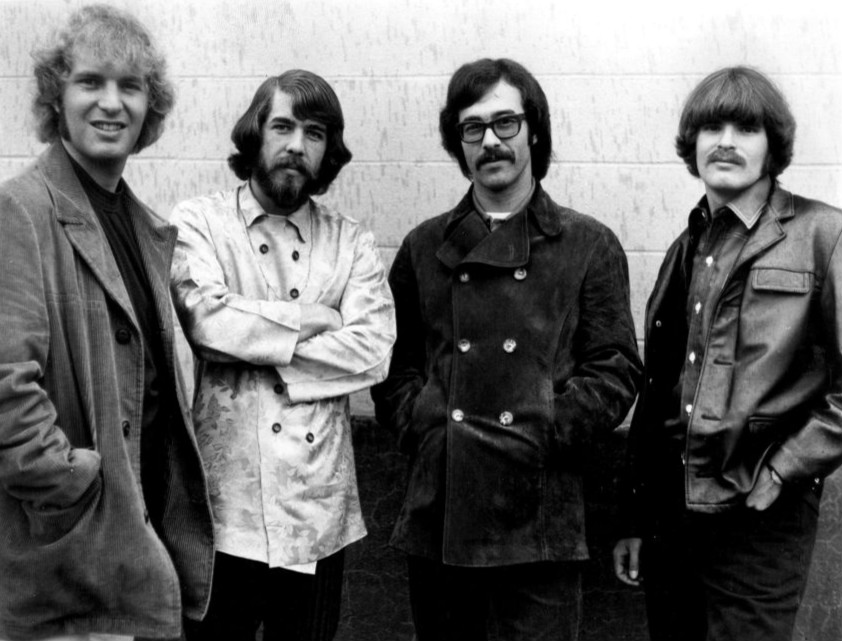
CCR in 1968

Rolling Stone logo

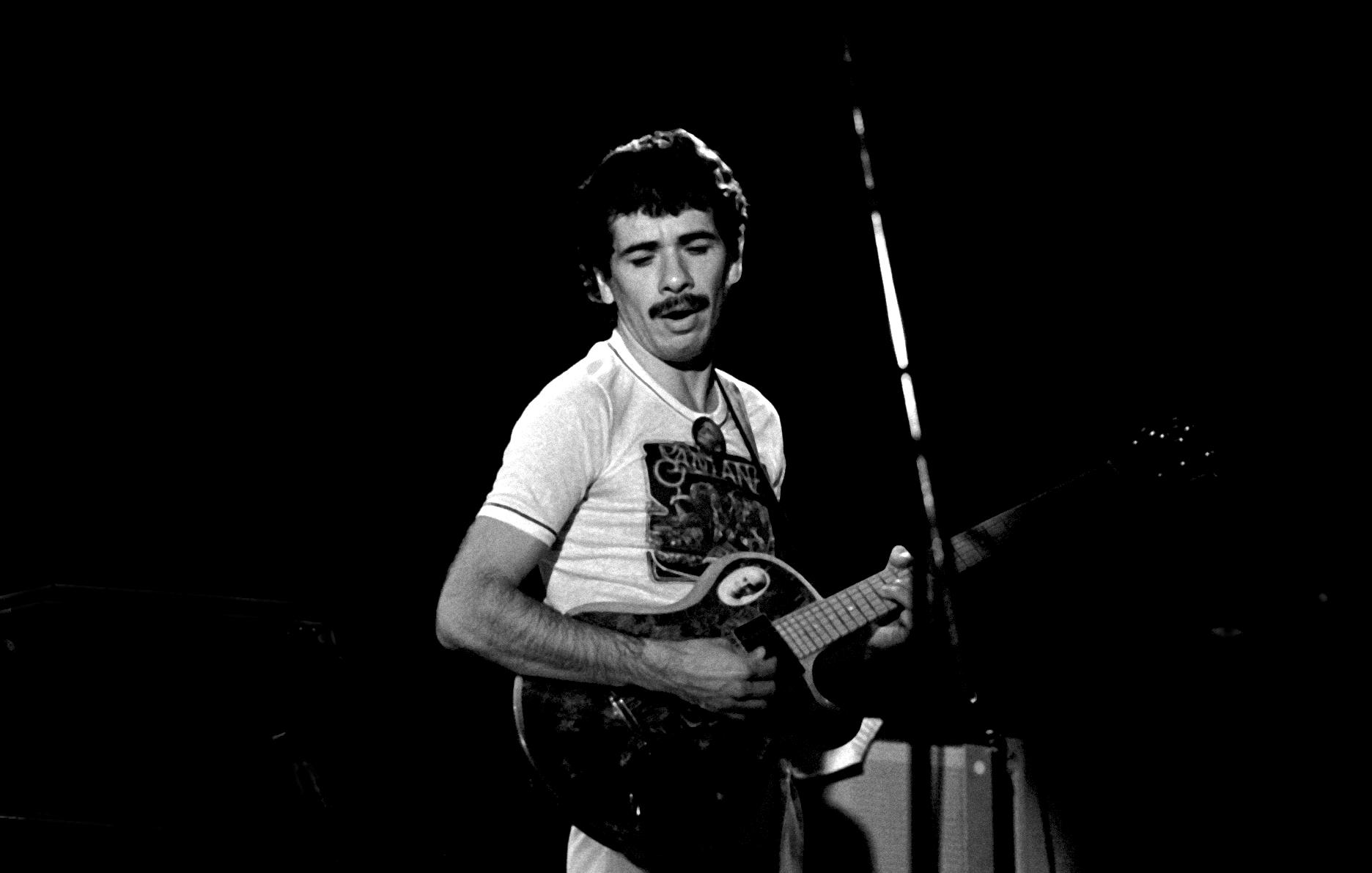
Carlos Santana in 1973

- KICU-TV Channel 36 signs on the air in San Francisco

• The Mantra-Rock Dance concert takes place at the Avalon Ballroom in San Francisco
• The Human Be-In (poster artwork from magazine cover depicted, left) occurs at San Francisco's Golden Gate Park, a prelude to the Summer of Love
• The University of California, Berkeley Graduate School of Journalism is established
• Creedence Clearwater Revival (pictured, right) is formed in El Cerrito
• Rolling Stone magazine (current logo pictured, right) begins publishing in San Francisco
• Santana is formed in San Francisco by Carlos Santana (pictured, right)
• The Summer of Love comes to San Francisco

1968

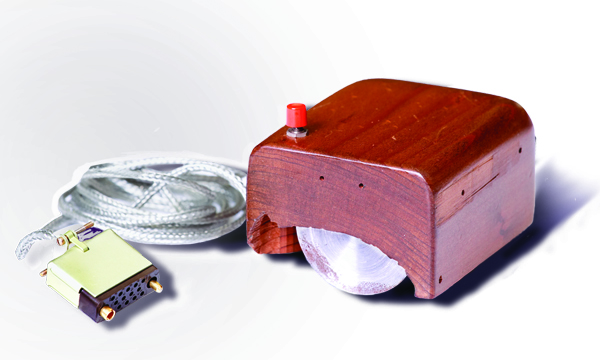
Computer mouse, based on Englebart's demo

- KBHK-TV Channel 44 signs on the air in San Francisco
- KEMO-TV Channel 20 signs on the air in San Francisco

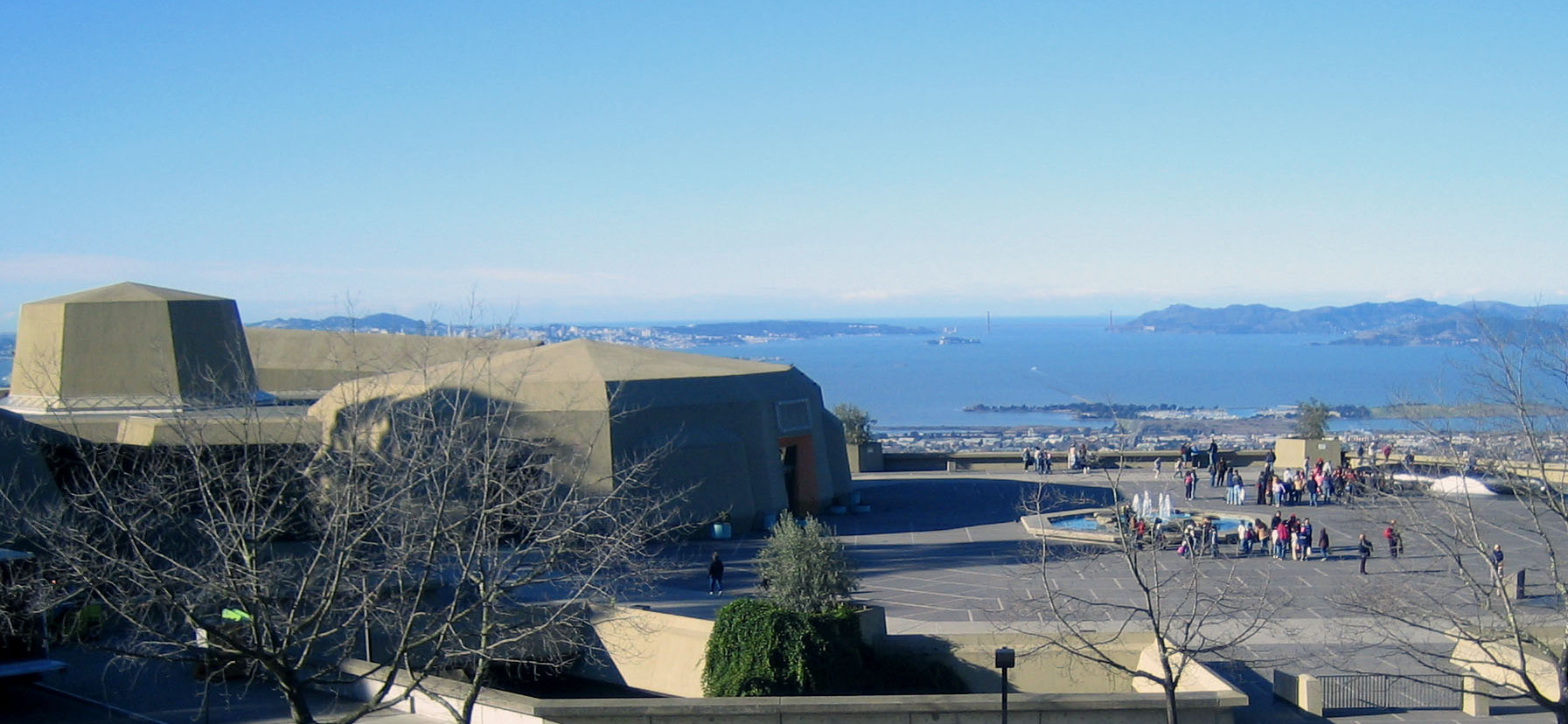
Lawrence Hall of Science

- In the last minute of a football game between the Oakland Raiders and the New York Jets, Oakland scores two touchdowns to overcome a 32–29 New York lead, just as the NBC Television Network breaks away from the game, with the Jets still winning, to air the television film Heidi
- Japan Airlines Flight 2 flying from Tokyo International Airport to San Francisco International Airport lands in the shallow waters of San Francisco Bay, two and a half miles short of the runway, with no injuries
- Douglas Englebart presents The Mother of All Demos (prototype based on the demo pictured) at the Fall Joint Computer Conference in San Francisco
- The Lawrence Hall of Science (pictured) is established in Berkeley
- KSFR, 94.9 FM, changes to call letters KSAN, and switches formats from classical music to freeform rock
- Luis Walter Alvarez at the University of California, Berkeley is awarded the Nobel Prize in Physics
1969

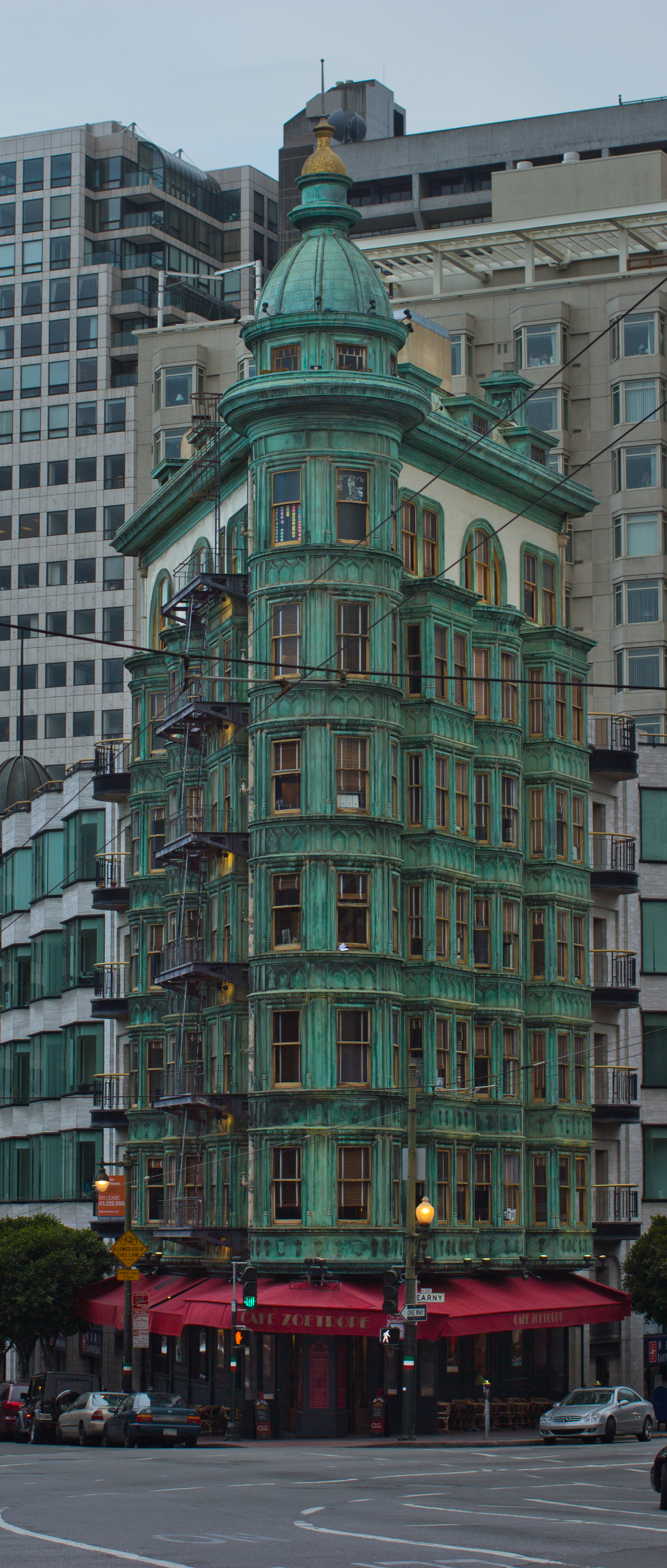
Sentinel Building, American Zoetrope HQ

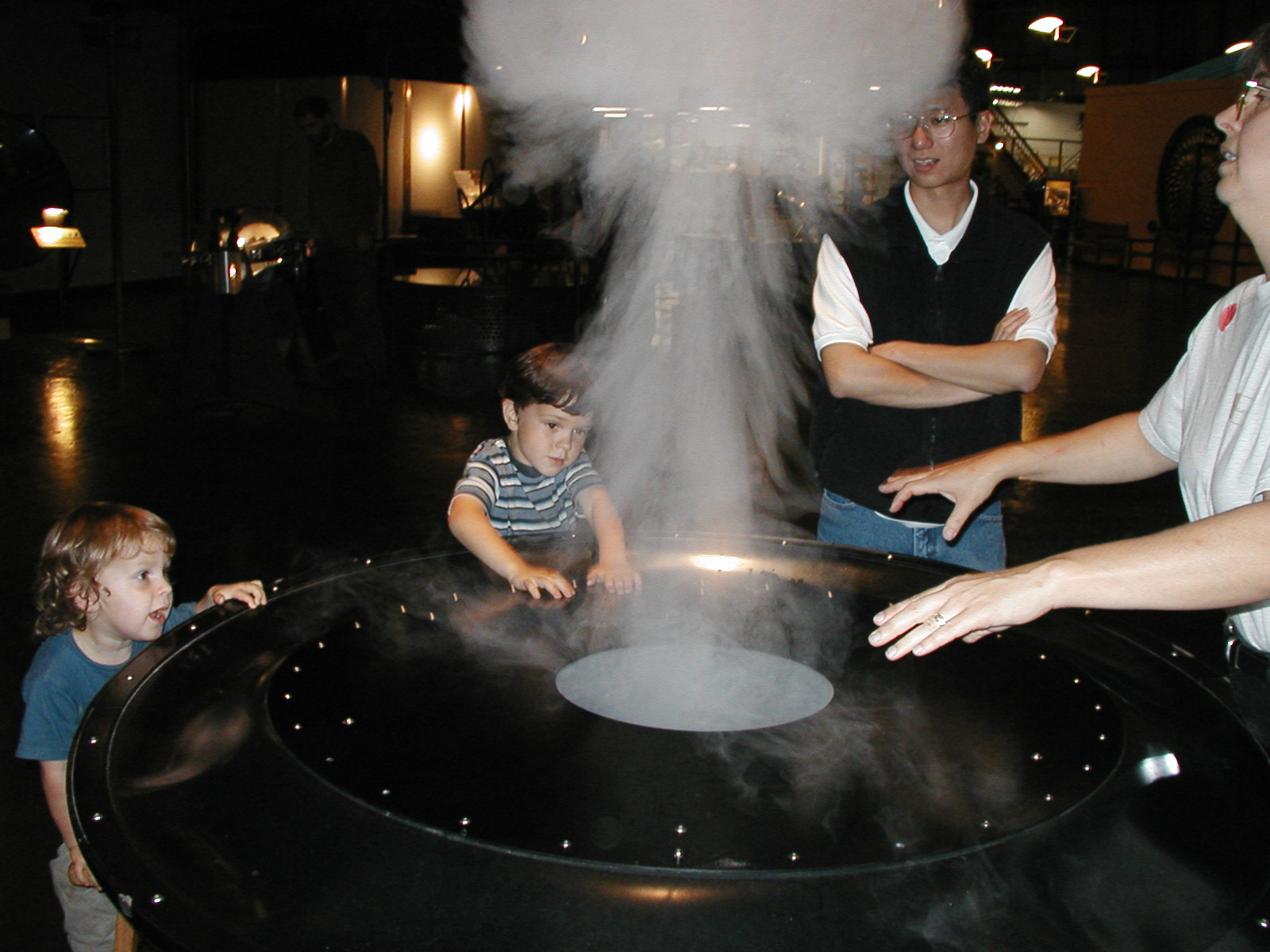
Children experimenting with vapor, Exploratorium

Logo for The Gap

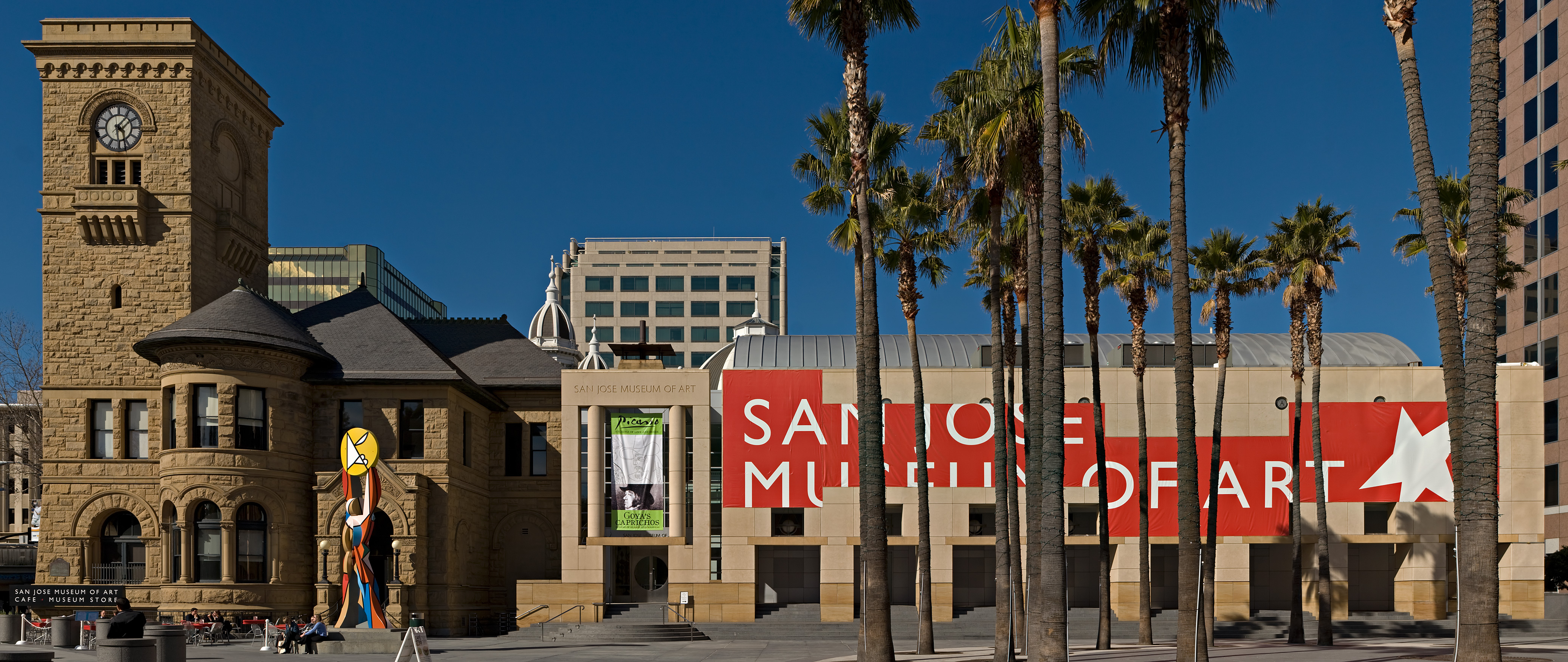
San Jose Museum of Art

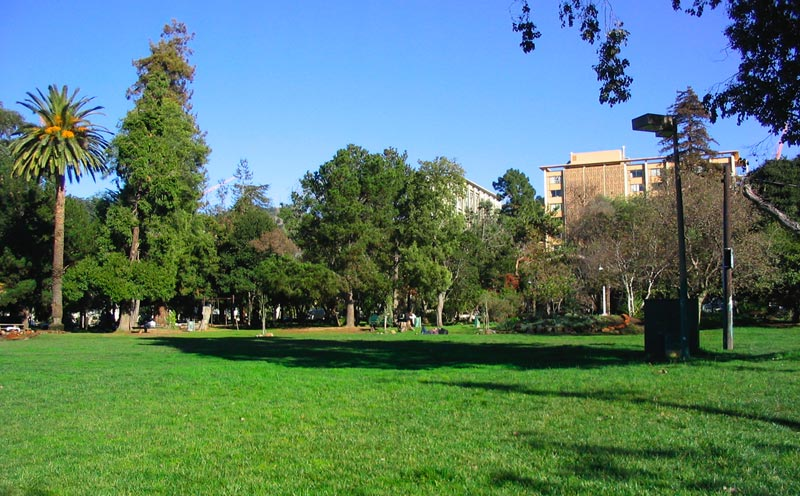
People's Park, Berkeley

• The Altamont Free Concert is held at the Altamont Speedway between Tracy and Livermore
• Advanced Micro Devices is founded in Sunnyvale
• American Zoetrope (headquarters at the Sentinel Building pictured) is founded in San Francisco by Francis Ford Coppola
• The Exploratorium (interior pictured) is founded in San Francisco
• Clothing retailer The Gap (early logo pictured) is founded in San Francisco
• The Oakland Museum of California is established
• The San Jose Museum of Art (pictured) is established
• A "People's Park" (pictured) is created by community activists on University of California, Berkeley property, off Telegraph Avenue in Berkeley
• The Bank of America Center building in San Francisco is completed
• The Occupation of Alcatraz by Native American activists begins
• Earth Day is first proposed by John McConnell at a UNESCO conference in San Francisco
• An unidentified person sends letters to the Vallejo Times Herald, the San Francisco Chronicle, and The San Francisco Examiner, taking credit for two fatal shooting incidents, then sends a fourth letter to the Examiner with the salutation "Dear Editor This is the Zodiac speaking."

1970

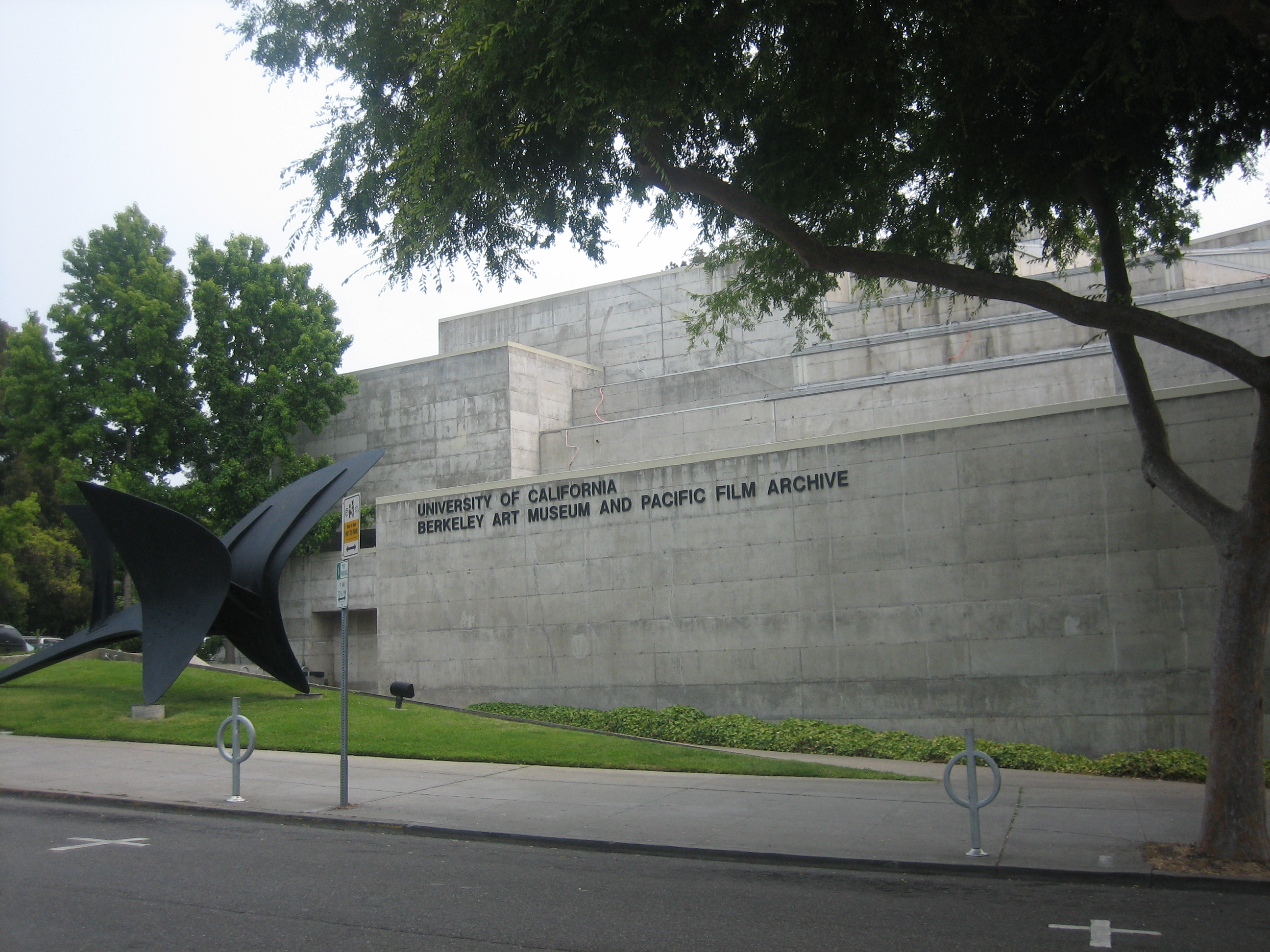
Berkeley Art Museum

- Jonathan Jackson attempts to negotiate the freedom of the Soledad Brothers (which included his older brother George) by kidnapping Superior Court judge Harold Haley from the Marin County Civic Center in San Rafael. The resulting shootout leaves four men dead, including both Jackson and Judge Haley.
- People v. Newton reverses the voluntary manslaughter conviction of Huey P. Newton in the death of an Oakland Police officer
- A pipe bomb filled with shrapnel detonates on the ledge of a window at the San Francisco Police Department's Golden Gate Park station, killing one officer and wounding nine
- The Berkeley Art Museum and Pacific Film Archive (pictured) opens
- Ron Dellums is elected to California's 7th congressional district
- San Jose's population is 459,913, an increase by 125% from 1960's 204,196
1971

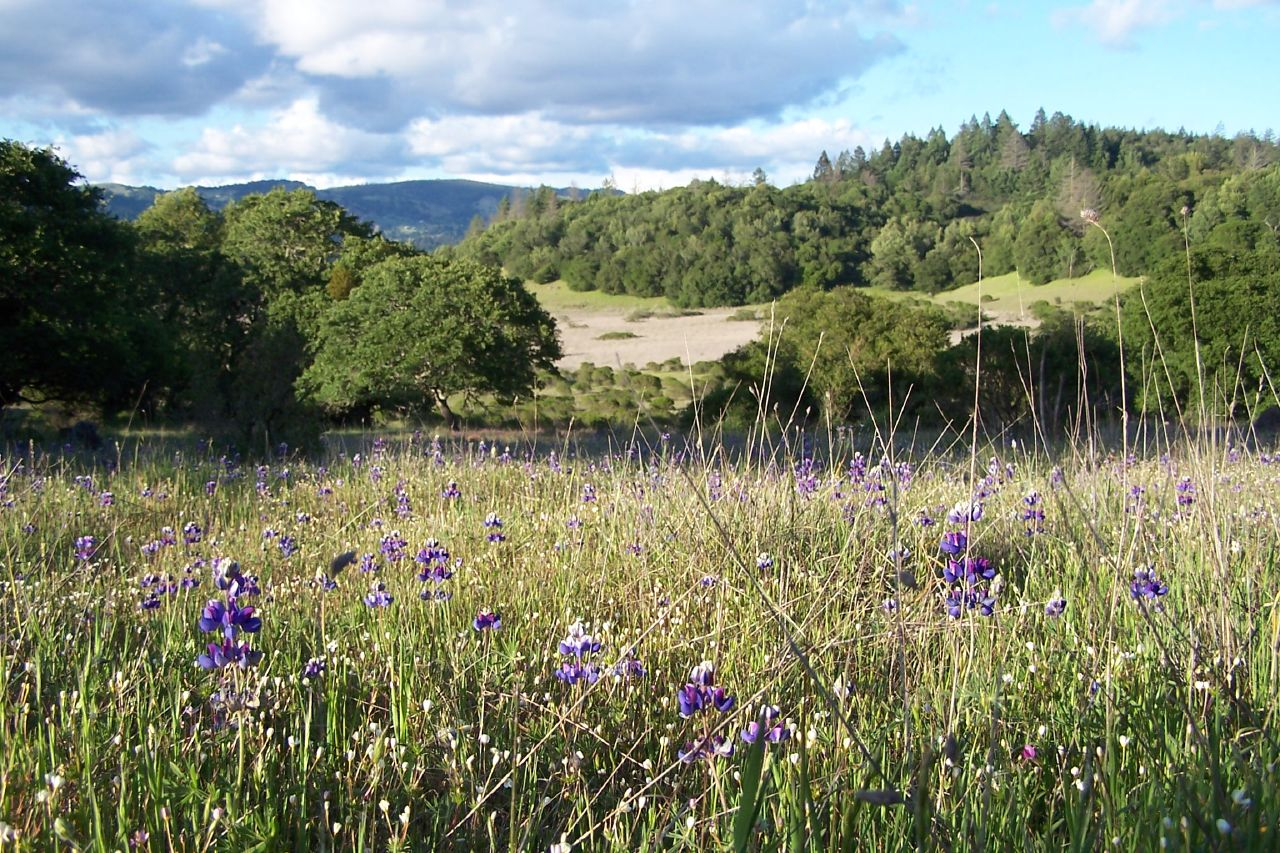
Lupines at Annadel State Park

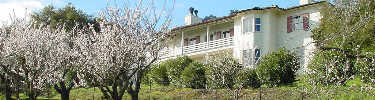
Tao House, Eugene O'Neill National Historic Site

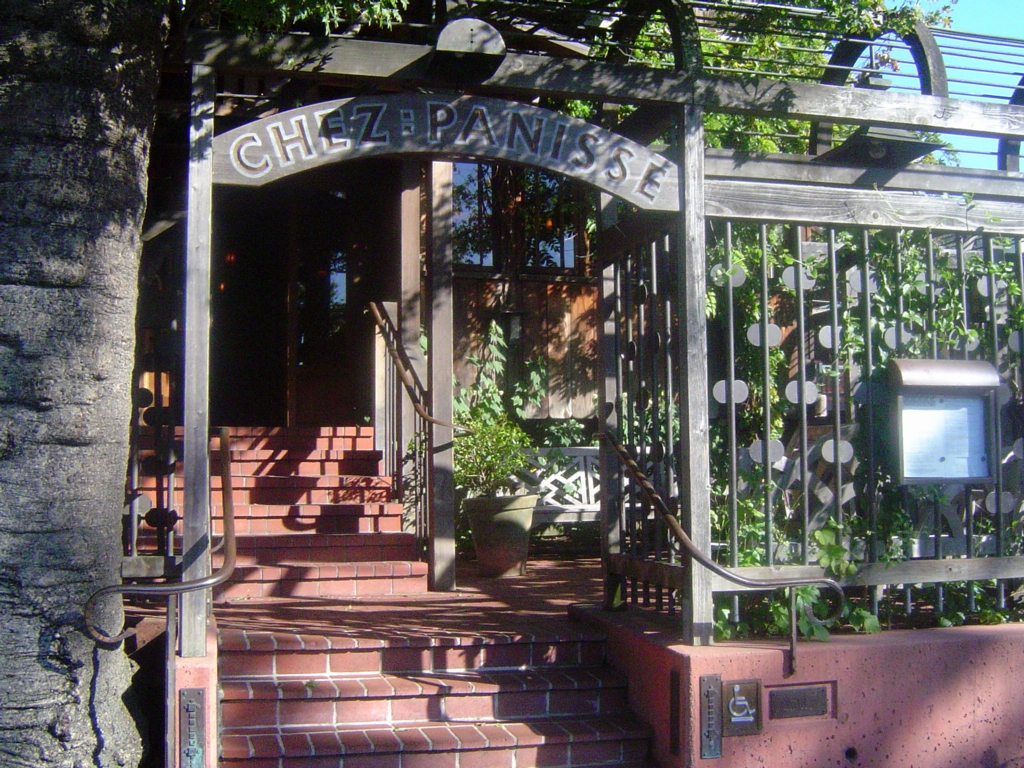
Chez Panisse

- Two Standard Oil tankers collide in the San Francisco Bay, spilling 800,000 gallons of oil
- Annadel State Park (pictured) is established in the Sonoma Valley
- Erhard Seminars Training is founded in San Francisco
- Eugene O'Neill's Tao House (pictured), in what is now Danville, is declared a National Historic Landmark
- Chez Panisse restaurant (pictured) is established in Berkeley
- Filmmaker George Lucas founds Lucasfilm in San Rafael, the same year he releases THX 1138, filmed in the San Francisco Bay Area
- Japanese American city councilman Norman Mineta is elected Mayor of San Jose
- The Palo Alto Community Cultural Center is founded in Palo Alto
1972

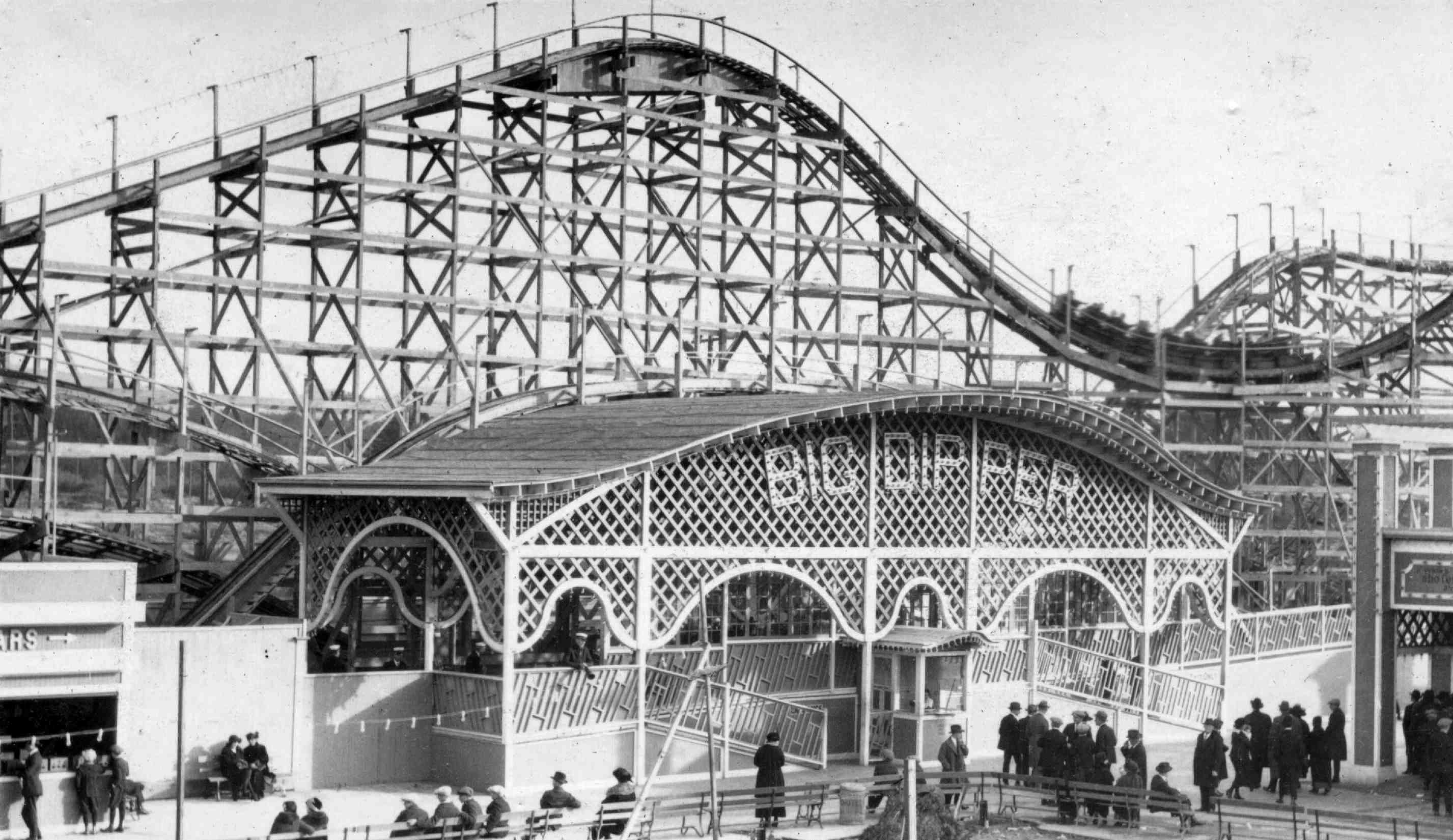
Playland in San Francisco

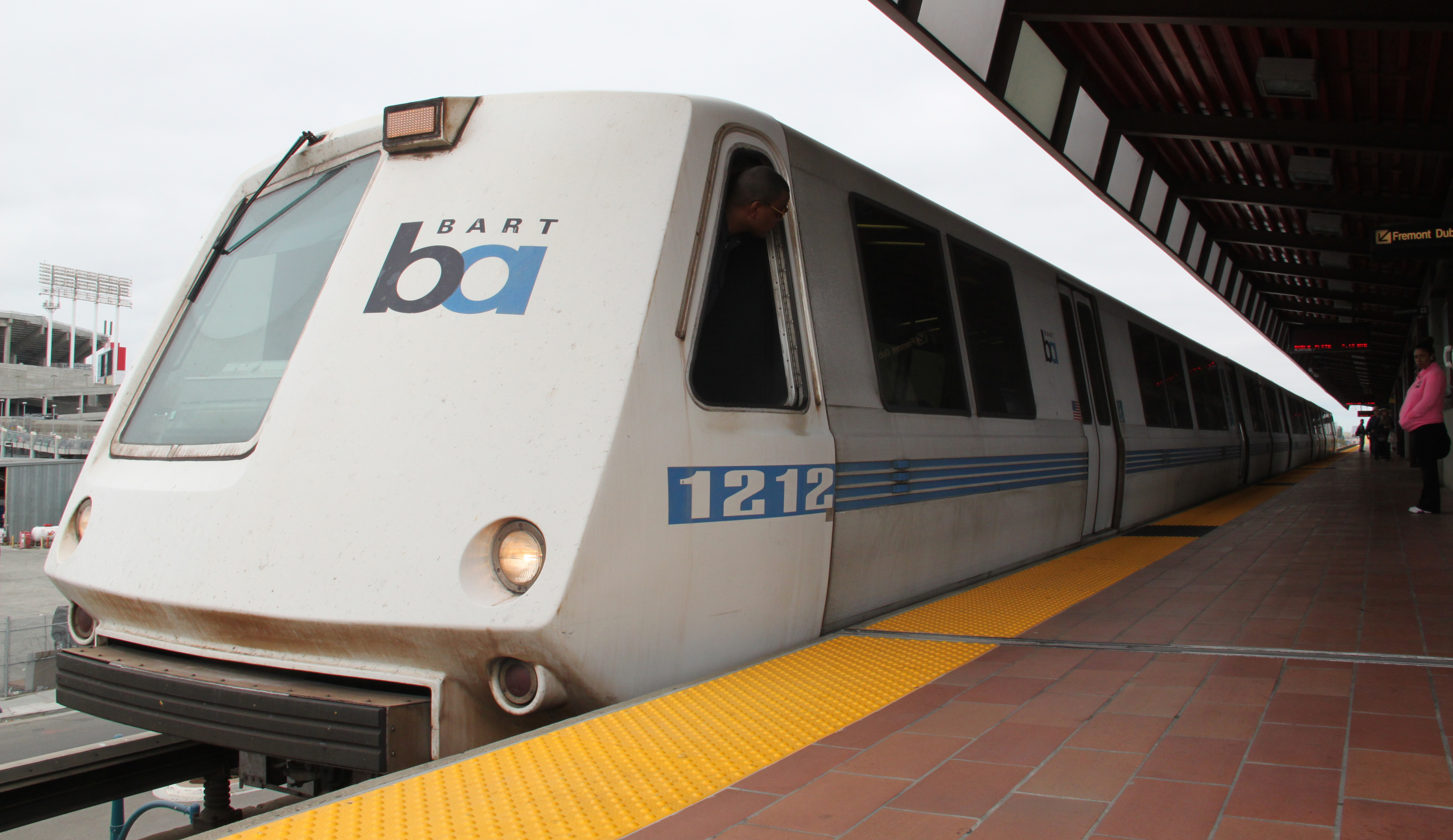
Early model BART car

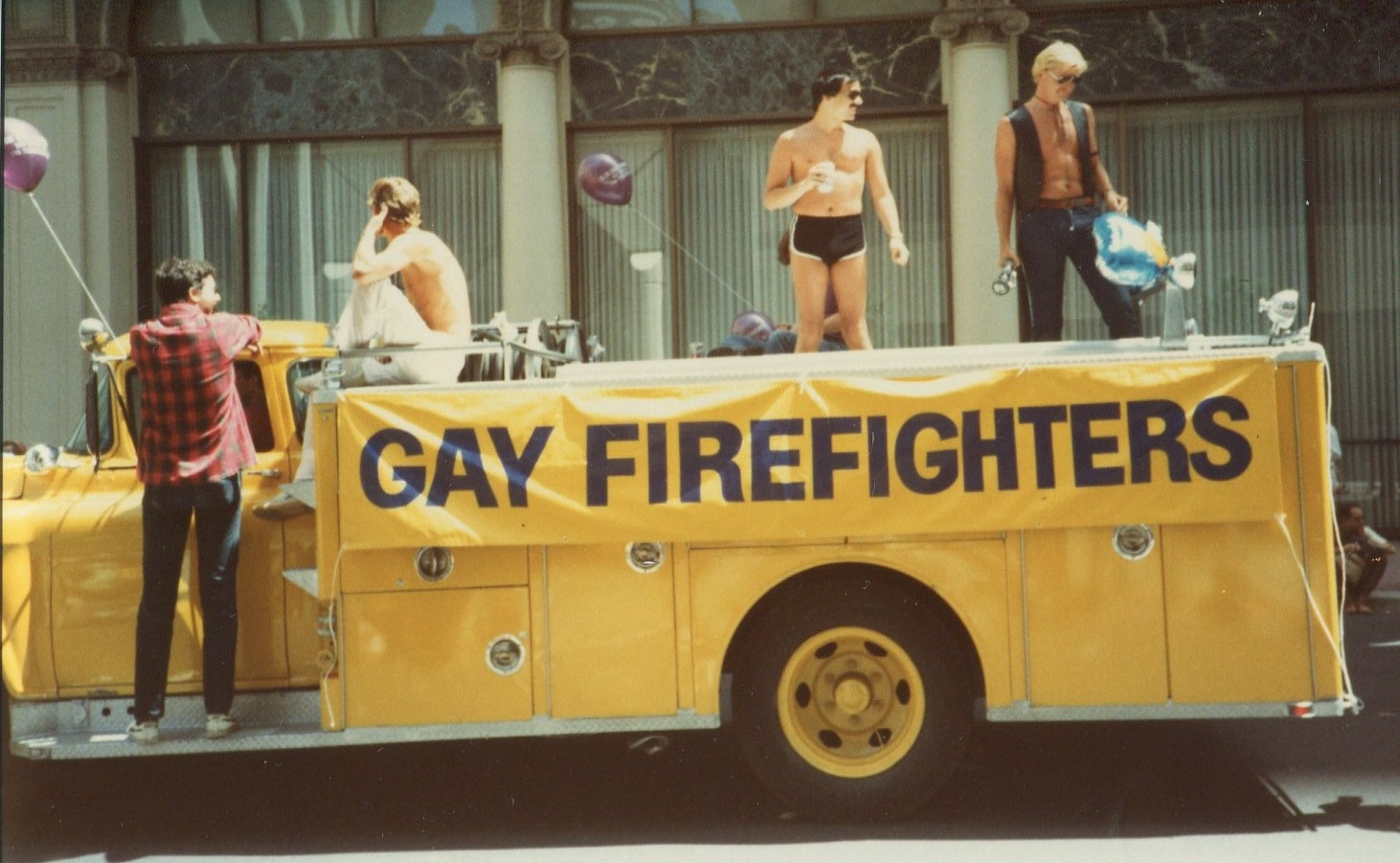
Gay Firefighters float at Gay Pride 1983

- The Stanford marshmallow experiment results are published
- The Tiffany Building in San Francisco is completed
- Playland (pictured) in San Francisco closes
- Bay Area Rapid Transit (early car model pictured) begins operations
- The Haas-Lilienthal House in San Francisco opens to the public
- Venture capital firm Kleiner Perkins Caufield & Byers is founded in Menlo Park
- Stag's Leap Wine Cellars in the Napa Valley produces its first vintage
- The first San Francisco Pride festival, then called Christopher Street West, attracts an estimated 54,000 attendees (1983 parade pictured)
- The Oakland A's win the World Series
- The pornographic film Behind the Green Door is released, directed by the San Francisco-based Mitchell Brothers
1973

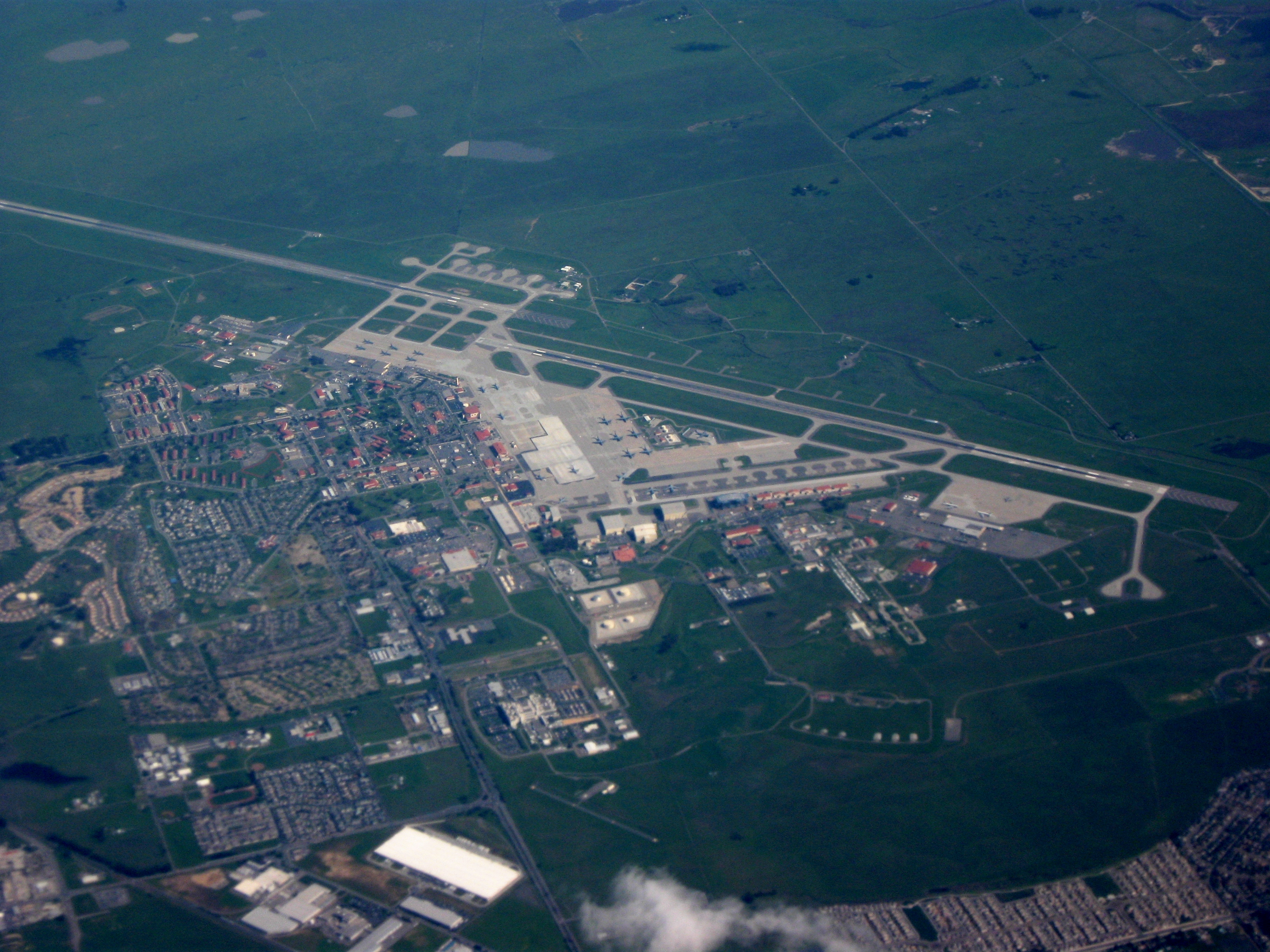
Travis Air Force Base

- Burst of Joy, depicting United States Air Force Lt. Col. Robert L. Stirm being reunited with his family, after spending more than five years in captivity as a prisoner of war in North Vietnam, is taken at Travis Air Force Base (pictured) in Solano County
- 16 people are killed, during a string of racially motivated attacks, dubbed the Zebra murders, committed by African-American men against mostly white victims, in San Francisco, continuing into 1974
- The Oakland A's win the World Series
- Bill Owens' photoessay Suburbia, featuring images of Livermore, is published by Straight Arrow Press in San Francisco
1974

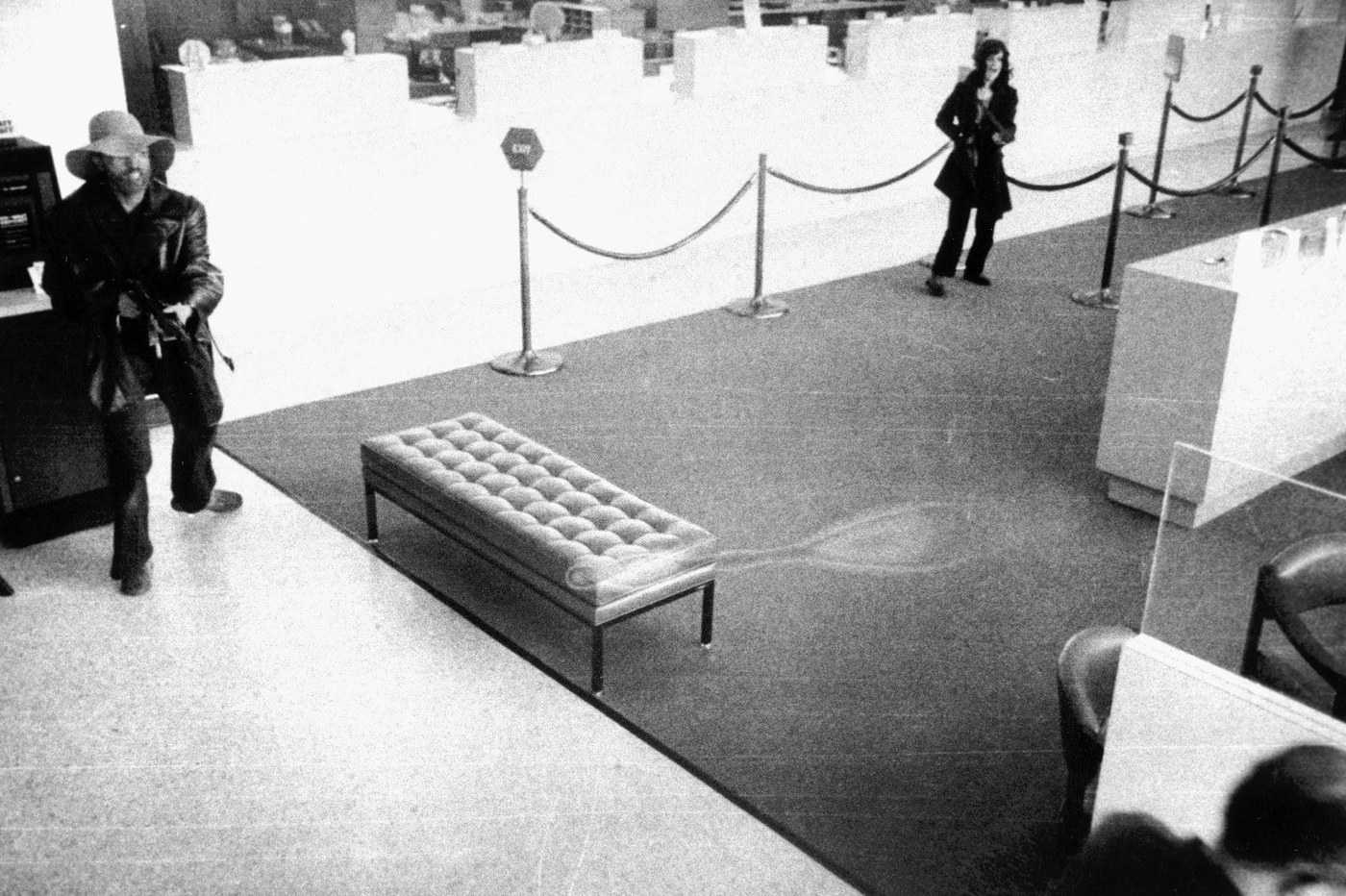
Patty Hearst with gun

- The University of California, Berkeley College of Natural Resources is established
- Symbionese Liberation Army members hold up a Hibernia Bank in San Francisco, where an iconic image (pictured) of kidnapped heiress Patricia Hearst is caught on security footage
- The serial Tales of the City by Armistead Maupin appears in the Pacific Sun alternative newsweekly
1975
- George Moscone is elected mayor of San Francisco
- KDTV Channel 60 (now Channel 14) signs on the air in San Francisco
- The Marine Mammal Center (staff and patient pictured) is established in the Marin Headlands at a former Nike Missile site
- Gary Snyder's 1974 Turtle Island (after the Goano'ganoch'sa'jeh'seroni name for the lands of North America) wins the Pulitzer Prize for Poetry
- The San Francisco Review of Books is founded by Ronald Nowicki
- The Golden State Warriors win the NBA Finals
1976

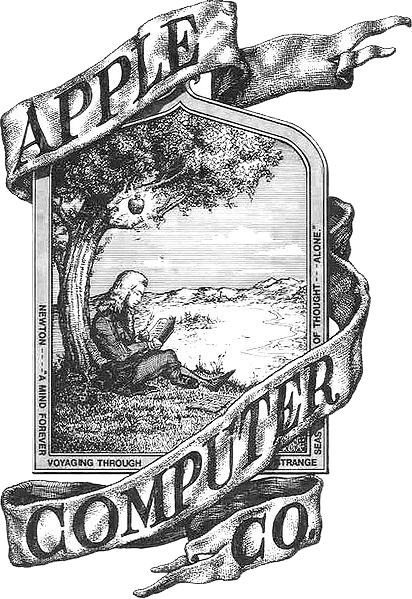
Apple Computer's first logo

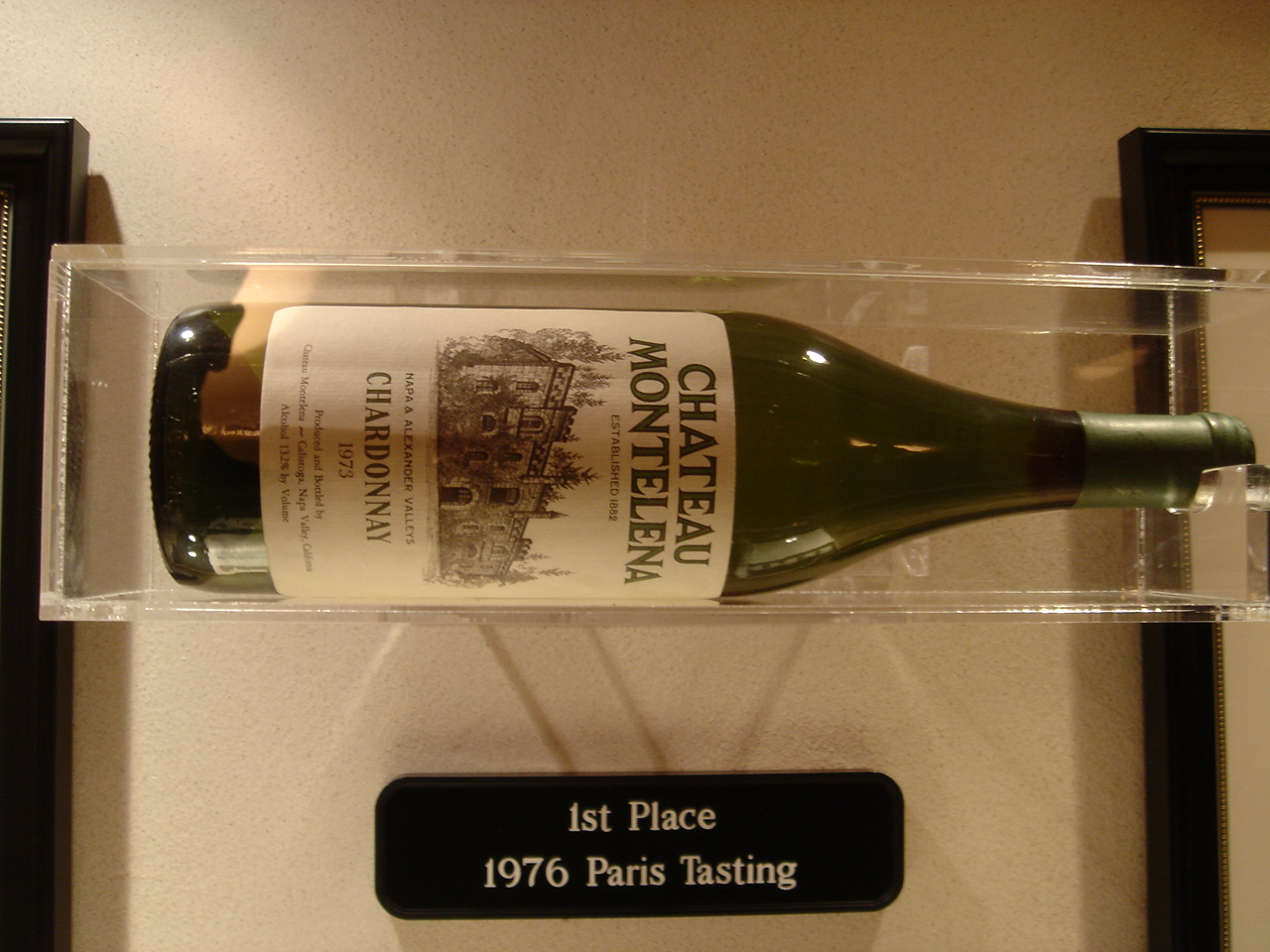
Chateau Montelena 1973

• Five unsolved murders of young women are committed in San Mateo County
• Apple Inc. (pictured, left) is founded in Cupertino by Steve Jobs, Steve Wozniak, and Ronald Wayne
• Napa Valley wineries Stag's Leap Wine Cellars and Chateau Montelena (pictured, right) place best in the red and white wine categories respectively, against their traditionally first ranked French competitors, in the wine tasting that becomes known as the Judgment of Paris
• China Camp State Park is established in San Rafael
• Fairfield-based candy company Herman Goelitz sells their first Jelly Bellies
• Cyra McFadden's The Serial's first installments are published in the Pacific Sun alternative newsweekly
• Dennis Richmond becomes the lead anchor at KTVU news in Oakland, an early African American news anchor in a major US television market
• KPIX television in San Francisco debuts a locally produced magazine program called Evening: The MTWTF Show

1977

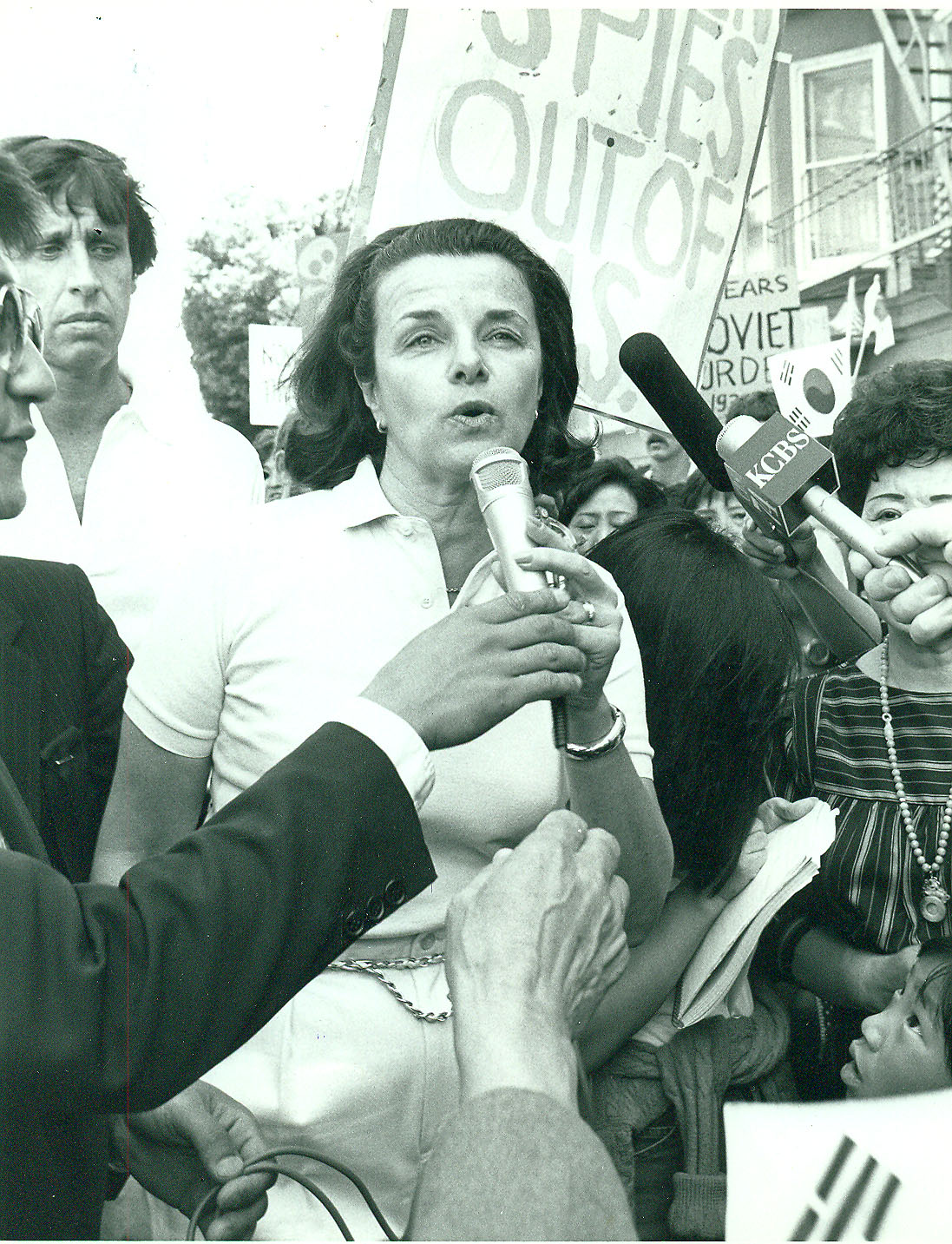
Dianne Feinstein

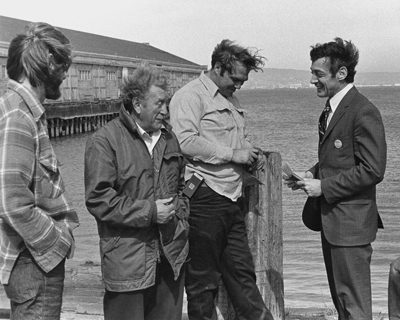
Harvey Milk

• The San Francisco Board of Supervisors election places Dianne Feinstein (pictured, left), Harvey Milk (pictured, far right) and Dan White on the board
• Oracle Corporation is founded in Santa Clara
• Victoria's Secret opens its first store at the Stanford Shopping Center in Palo Alto
• Members of the Joe Boys gang open fire at the Golden Dragon Restaurant in Chinatown, in an assault on rival gang Wah Ching, leaving 5 people dead and 11 others injured, none of whom are gang members.
• Apple Computer introduces the Apple II

1978

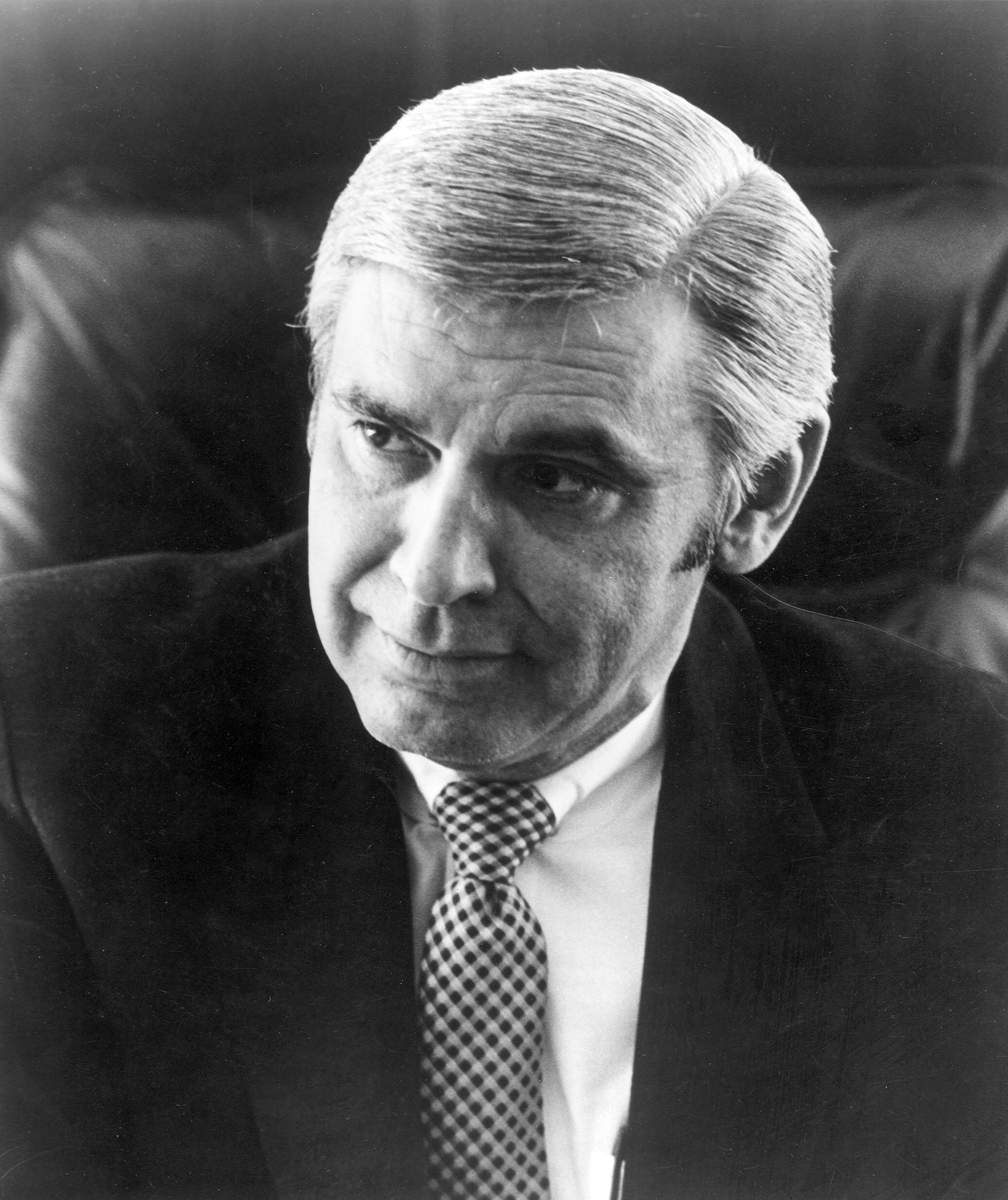
Leo Ryan

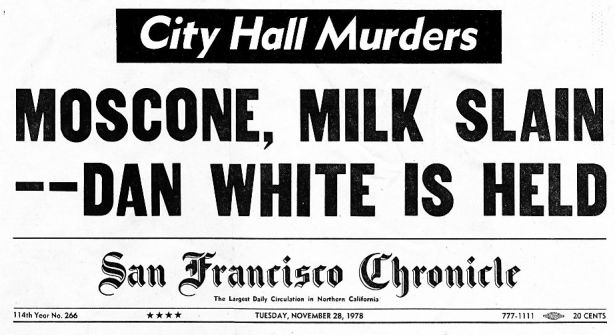
SF Chronicle headline of the assassinations of Moscone and Milk

- 909 members of the San Francisco-based People's Temple die, primarily from cyanide poisoning, at an agricultural project coined Jonestown in Guyana, following the murder of five others by Temple members at Port Kaituma, including United States Congressman Leo Ryan (pictured) of the Bay Area
- San Francisco Mayor George Moscone and San Francisco Supervisor Harvey Milk are shot and killed in San Francisco City Hall by former Supervisor Dan White (news headline pictured)
- Retailer Banana Republic is founded in Mill Valley
- The Dead Kennedys are formed in San Francisco
- The French Laundry restaurant opens in Yountville in the Napa Valley
- The San Francisco Gay Men's Chorus is formed
- The whaling ship Niantic is uncovered near the Transamerica Pyramid in San Francisco
1979

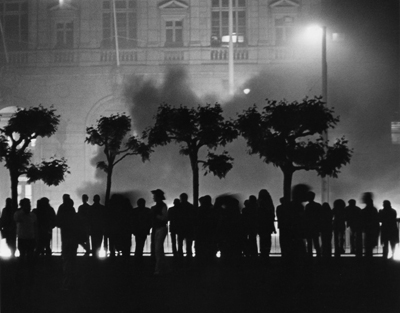
Rioters at SF City Hall

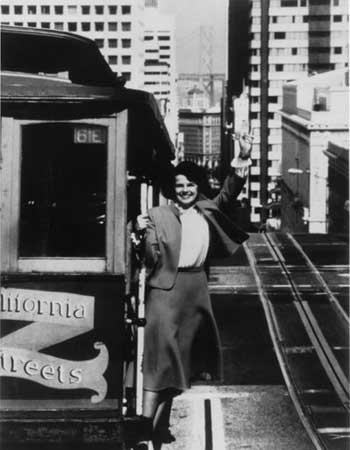
SF Mayor Dianne Feinstein

- The body of Tammy Vincent is found in Tiburon
- The White Night riots (pictured) erupt in San Francisco
- Dianne Feinstein (pictured) is elected mayor of San Francisco
- The Gilroy Garlic Festival is founded
- Huey Lewis and the News is founded in San Francisco
- Experimental music group Negativland is founded in Concord
- Data storage company Seagate Technology is founded in Cupertino
- David Carpenter commits his first trailside killings in the Bay Area
- A 5.7 magnitude earthquake strikes with an epicenter near Coyote Lake in Santa Clara County
1980

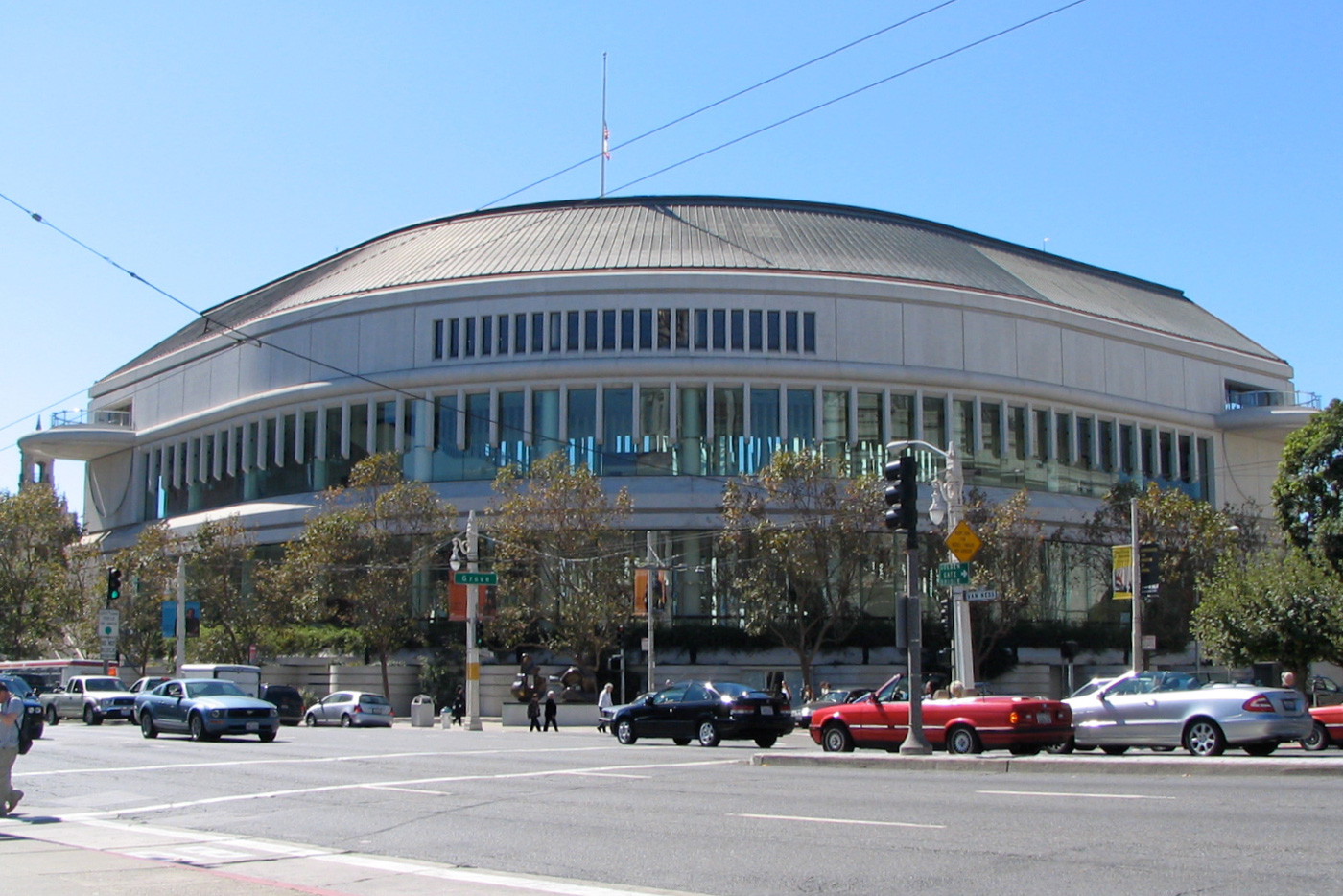
Davies Symphony Hall

- Hughes Airwest, based out of San Francisco International Airport, is acquired by Republic Airlines
- The Louise M. Davies Symphony Hall (pictured) in San Francisco is completed
- A medical patient in San Francisco is reported to have both Kaposi's sarcoma and Cryptococcus
- KSAN radio switches formats from freeform rock to country music
- University of California, Berkeley Slavic Languages and Literature Professor Czesław Miłosz (pictured) is awarded the Nobel Prize in Literature
1981

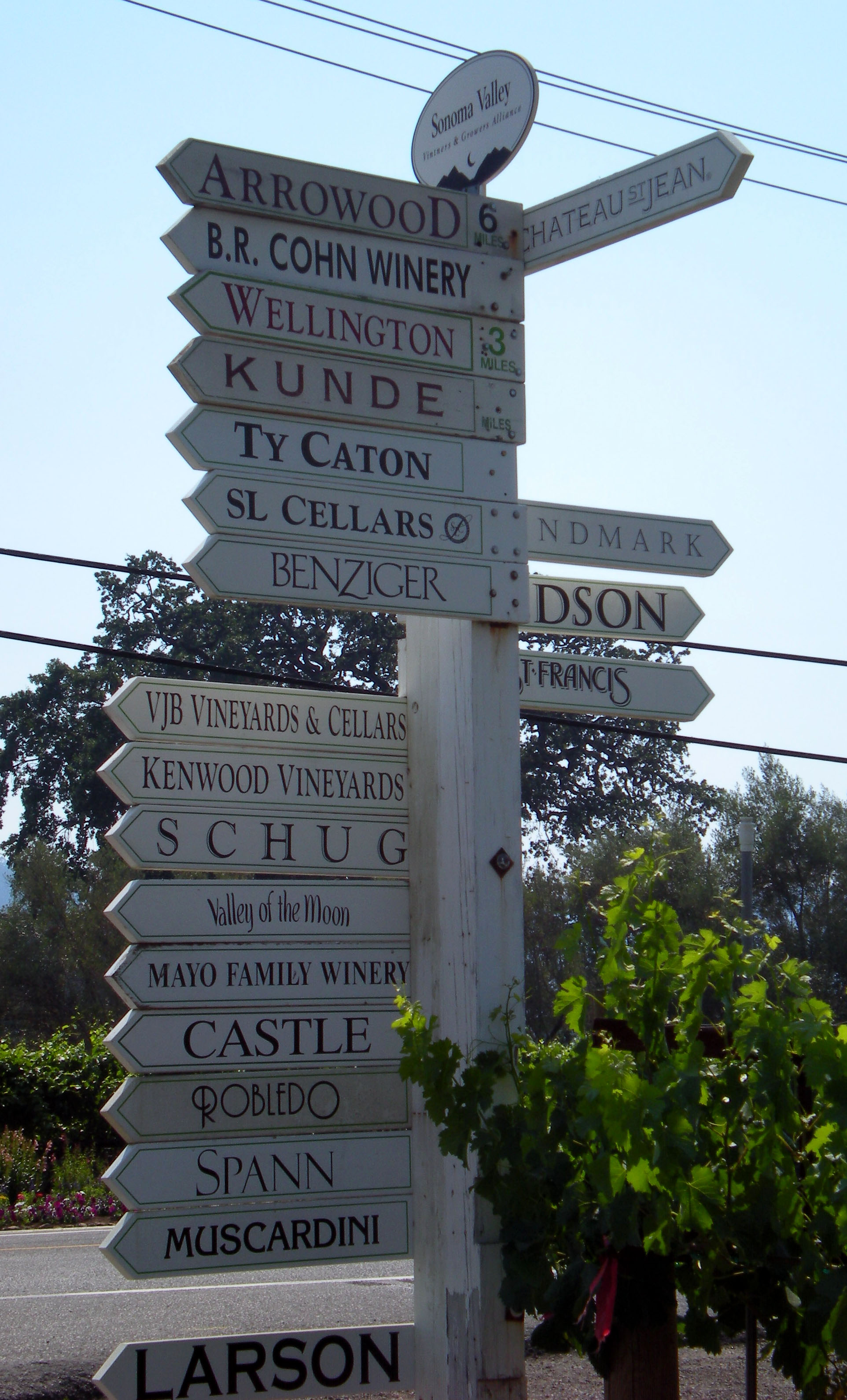
winery directional sign, Sonoma Valley

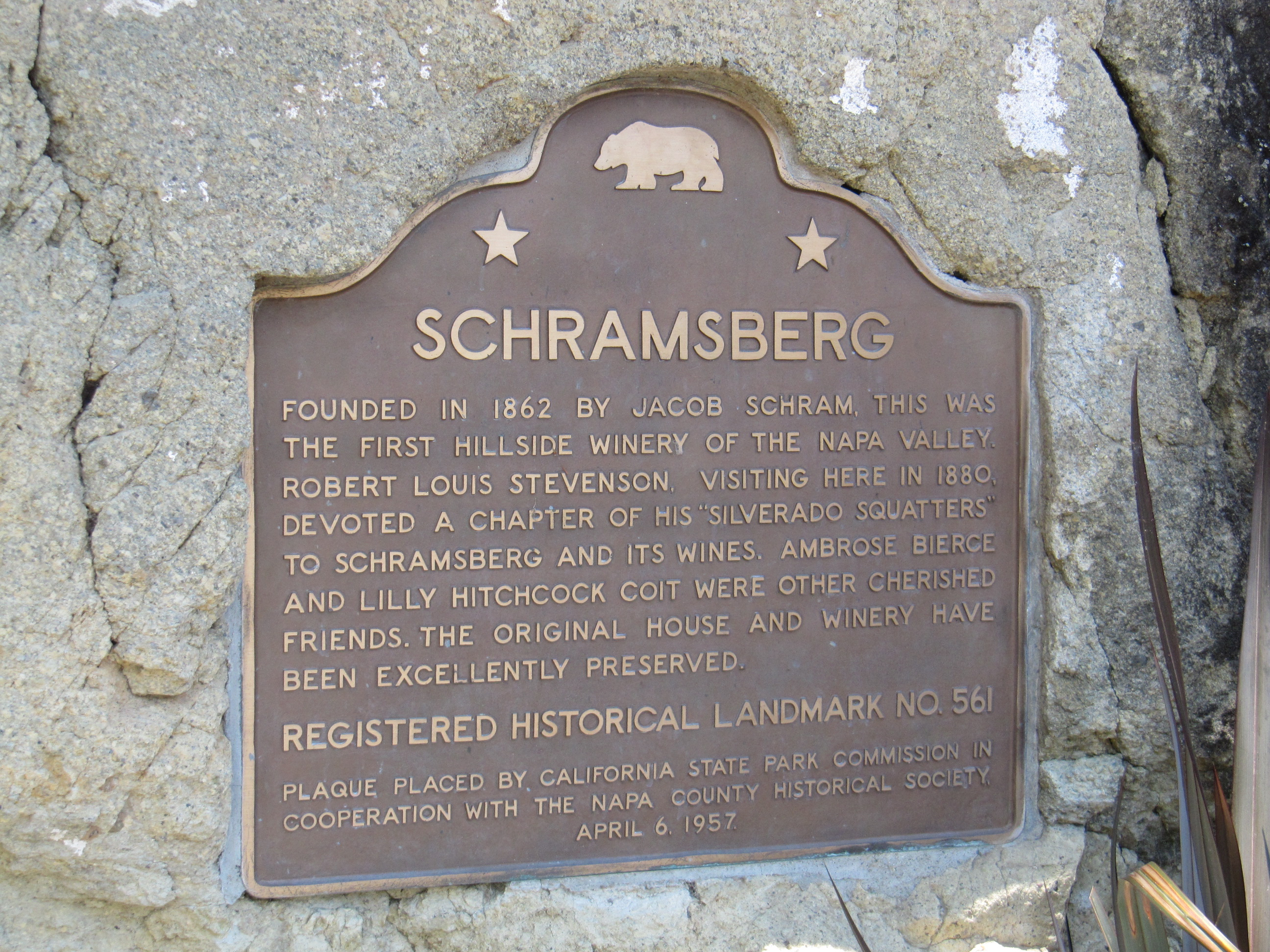
Napa Valley winery historic marker

• The first World Games are held in Santa Clara
• Erhard Seminars Training in San Francisco dissolved
• The Sonoma Valley AVA (winery directional sign pictured, left) is established
• The Napa Valley AVA (historic marker pictured, right) is established

- KSTS Channel 48 signs on the air in San Jose, California

• The Gulf of the Farallones National Marine Sanctuary is established in coastal waters off the Golden Gate
• Arthur Leonard Schawlow at Stanford University, along with Nicolaas Bloembergen and Kai Siegbahn, share the Nobel Prize in Physics for their work with lasers
• 14 year old Marcy Renee Conrad is murdered in Milpitas
• Ceratitis capitata, known commonly as the "Mediterranean fruit fly", infests the Bay Area

1982

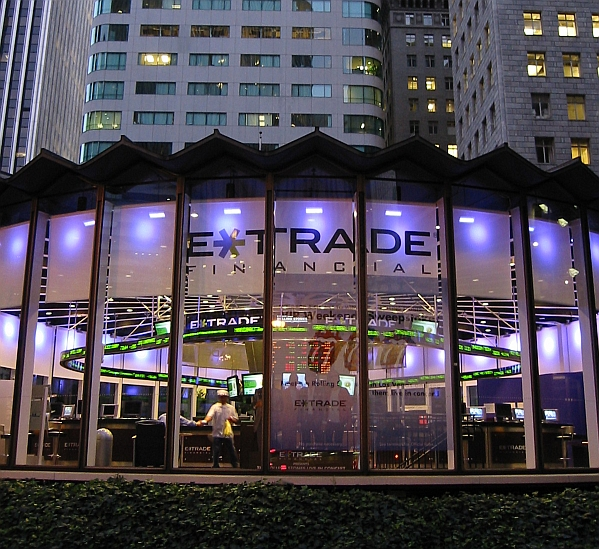
E-Trade San Francisco financial center

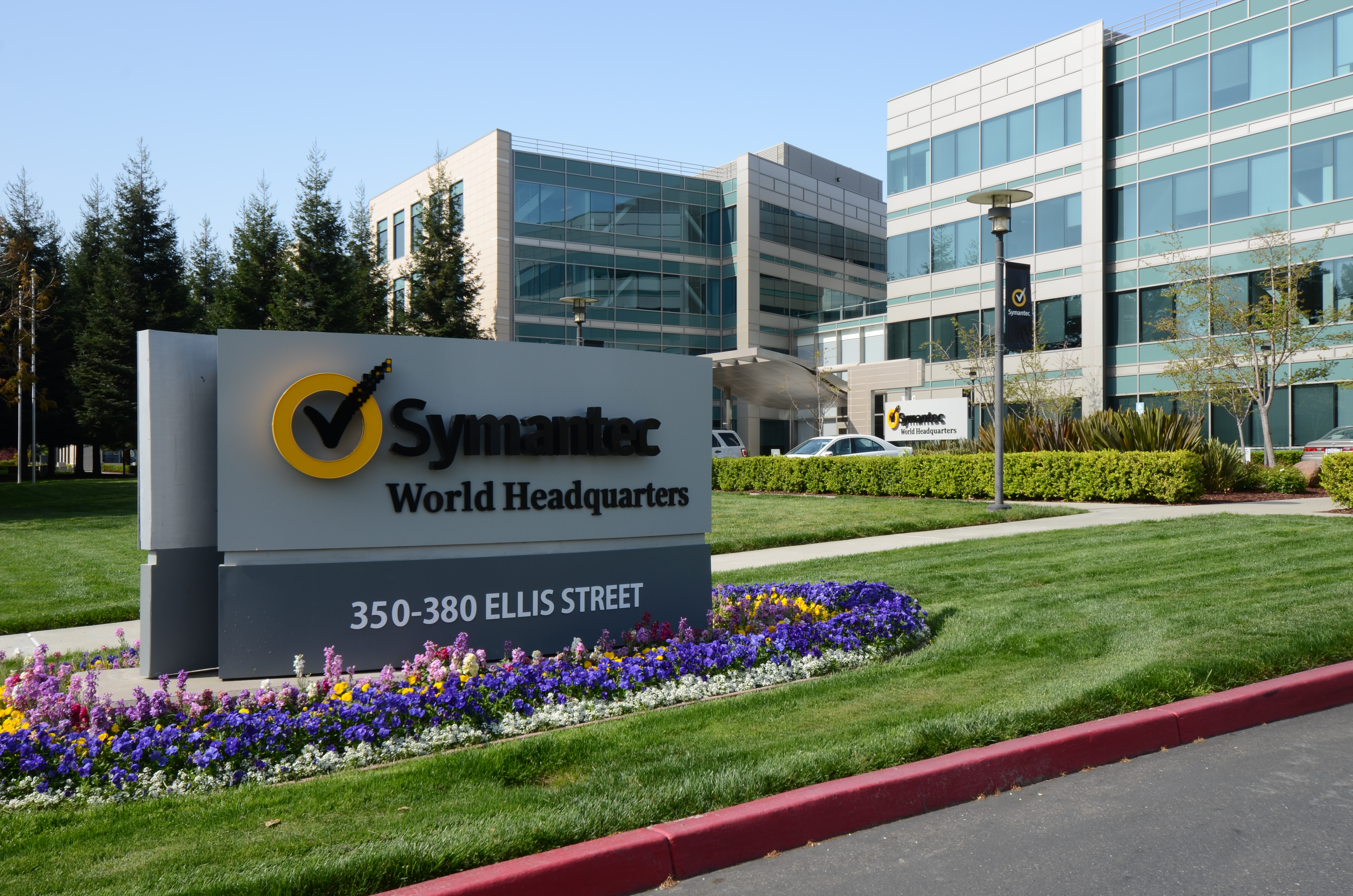
Symantec headquarters in Mountain View (2013)

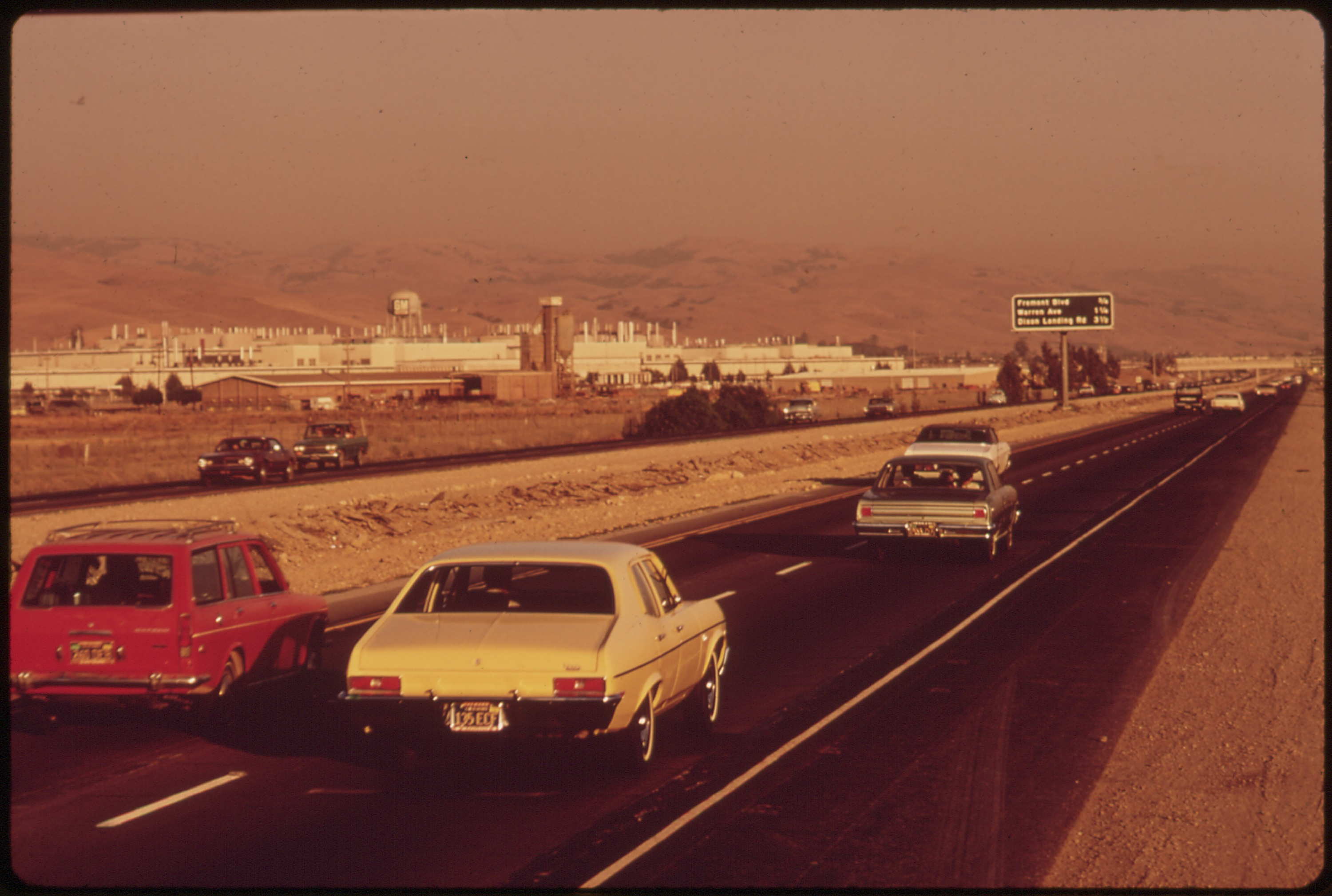
Fremont Assembly

- The Caldecott Tunnel fire kills seven people in the third (then-northernmost) bore of the Caldecott Tunnel, on State Route 24 between Oakland and Orinda
- San Francisco 49ers quarterback Joe Montana throws a memorable touchdown pass to Dwight Clark in the NFC Championship Game with the Dallas Cowboys
- The University of California Golden Bears perform The Play, a kickoff return during a college football game with the Stanford Cardinals, which is among the most memorable events in American sports.
- E-Trade (pictured) is founded in Palo Alto
- Symantec (pictured) is founded in Mountain View
- General Motors' Fremont Assembly (pictured) closes
- The San Francisco 49ers win the Super Bowl for the first time
- Cleve Jones and Marcus Conant establish the Kaposi's Sarcoma Research and Education Foundation
- Severe flooding in the Bay Area results in 33 deaths and $280 million in losses.
1983

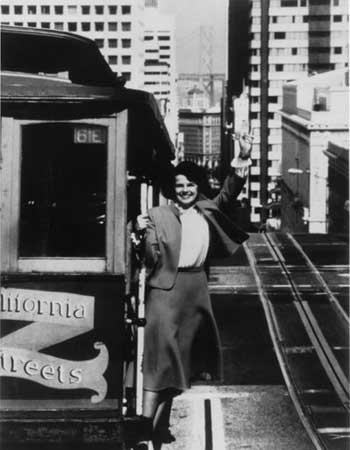
SF Mayor Dianne Feinstein

- The San Jose School District declares bankruptcy
- Dianne Feinstein (pictured) is re-elected mayor of San Francisco
- Tax preparation software company Intuit is founded in Mountain View
- KRCB-TV Channel 22 signs on the air in Cotati, California
- San Francisco General Hospital establishes the first inpatient ward and outpatient clinic in the United States to treat Acquired Immune Deficiency Syndrome
- Charles McCabe, writer of the "Fearless Spectator" and "Himself" columns for the San Francisco Chronicle, dies at his home in North Beach
1984

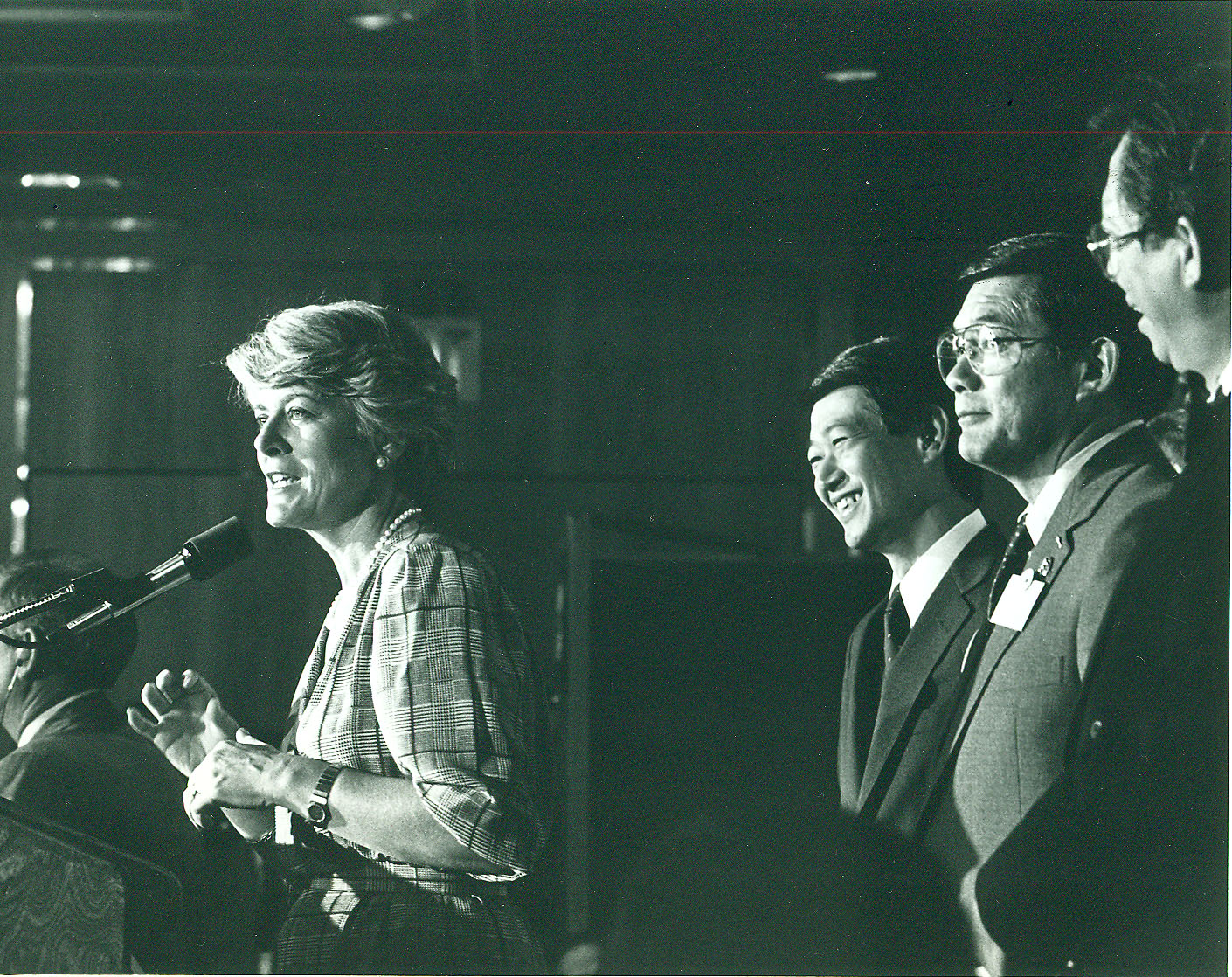
Geraldine Ferraro, with Bob Matsui, Norman Mineta and Tom Hsieh

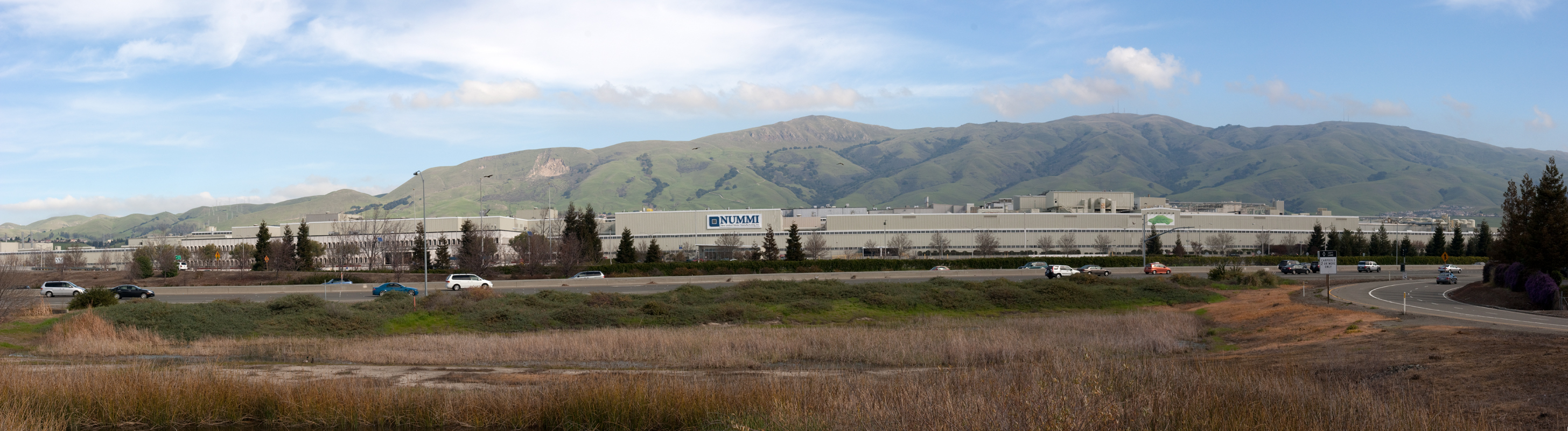
NUMMI Plant

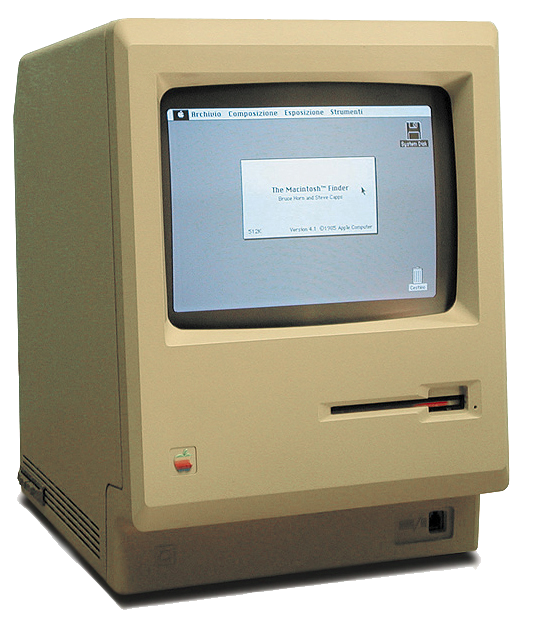

- The 1984 Democratic National Convention (vice presidential nominee Geraldine Ferraro pictured) is held at Moscone Center in San Francisco
- An earthquake with an epicenter near Mount Hamilton, close to Morgan Hill in the South Bay, inflicts over US$7 million in damage
- The Alexander Valley AVA is established
- California State Prison, Solano in Vacaville is completed
- The Cartoon Art Museum in San Francisco is established by publisher Malcolm Whyte
- New United Motor Manufacturing, Inc. (pictured) opens at the site of the former General Motors Fremont Assembly
- Apple Computer introduces the Macintosh personal computer (pictured)
1985

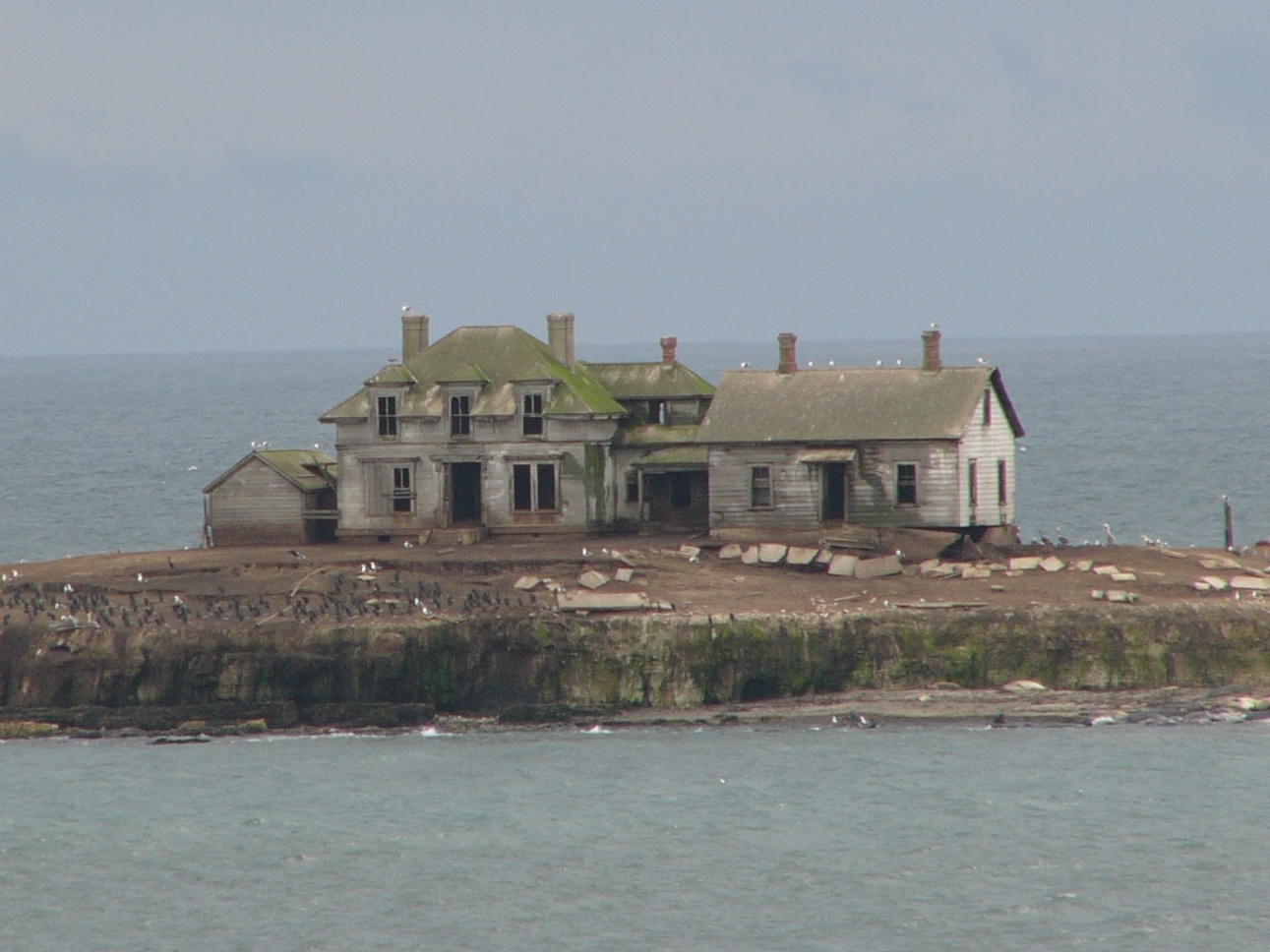
Abandoned lighthouse-keeper building, Año Nuevo Island

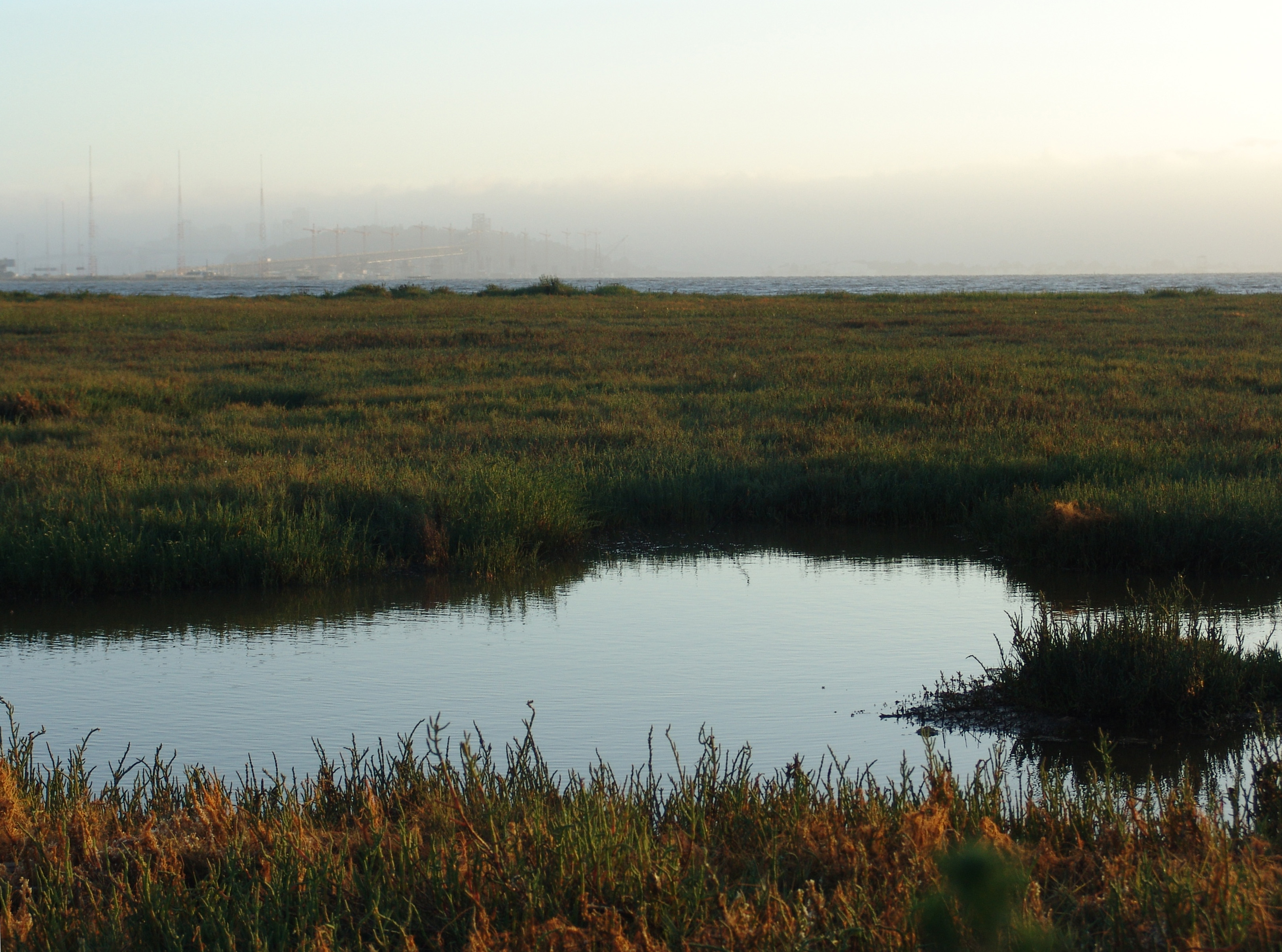

• A plane heading for Buchanan Field Airport loses control and crashes into the roof of Macys, killing the pilot and two passengers, and seriously injuring 84 Christmas shoppers at the Sun Valley Mall in Concord
• Año Nuevo State Park is established at Año Nuevo Island (pictured, left) and points in San Mateo County
• Emeryville Crescent State Marine Reserve (pictured, right) is established
• NeXT is founded in Redwood City by Apple Computer co-founder Steve Jobs, after being forced out of Apple
• The San Francisco 49ers win the Super Bowl for the second time

1986

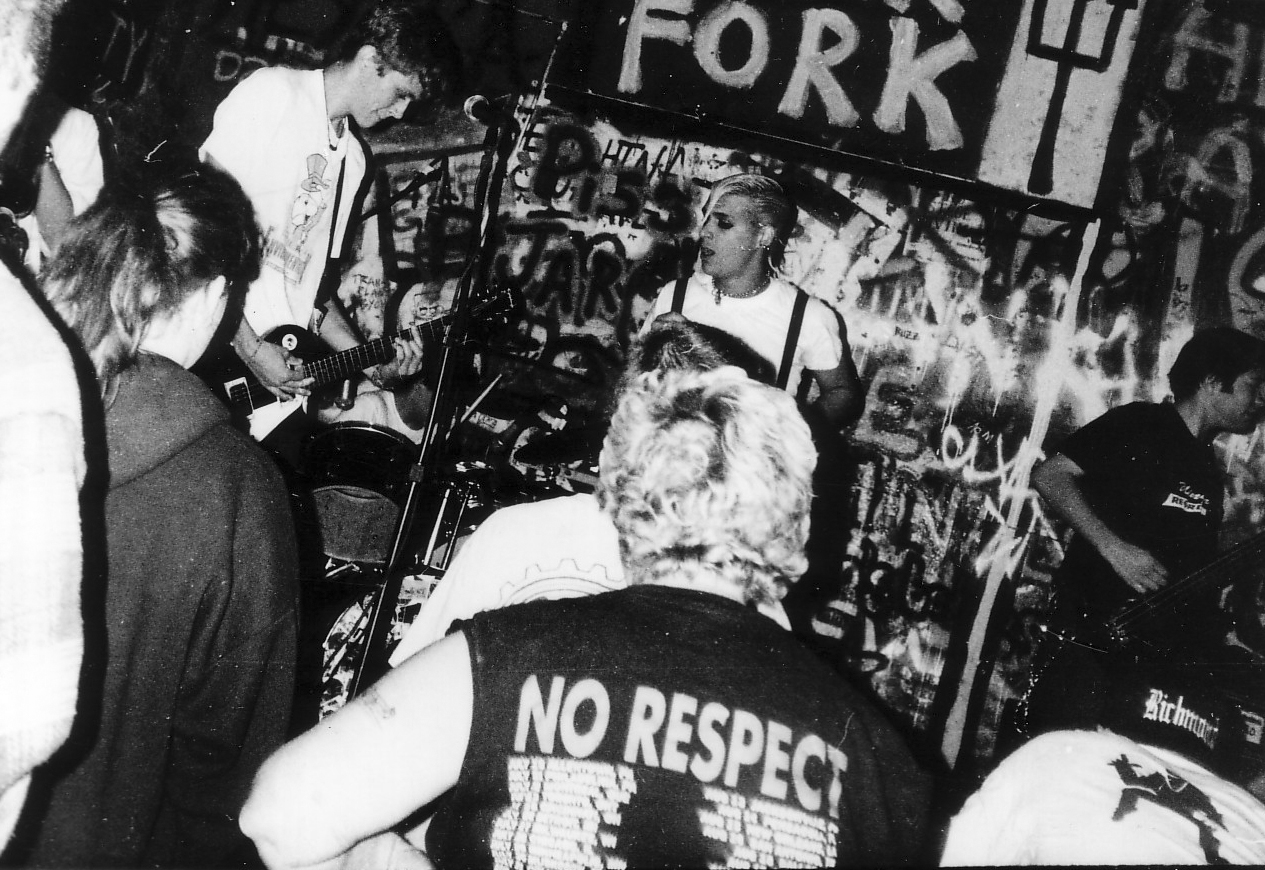
924 Gilman

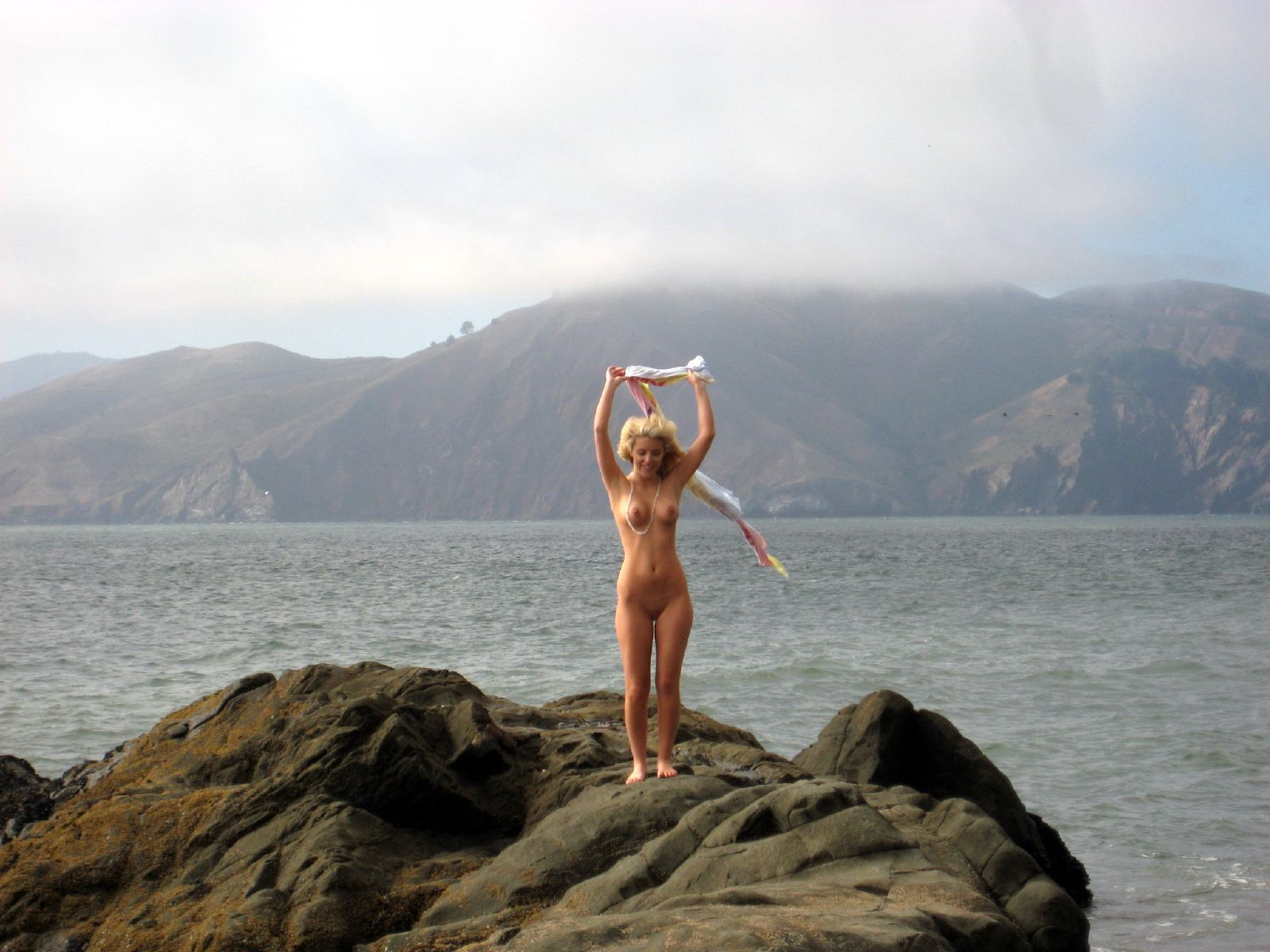
Nude woman at Baker Beach, evoking Burning Man

- The Napa River experiences its worst flooding of the 20th century
- The Oakland Symphony is dissolved
- The punk rock club 924 Gilman Street (pictured) is established in Berkeley
- The Cacophony Society of culture jammers is founded in San Francisco, and
- The first Burning Man gathering occurs at Baker Beach (pictured, with typical apparel of later events) in San Francisco
- Shoreline Amphitheatre opens in Mountain View
- Jackie Speier is elected to the California State Assembly
1987

Santa Clara VTA logo

- Art Agnos is elected mayor of San Francisco
- Punk rock band Green Day (Billie Joe Armstrong pictured) forms in the East Bay, with early gigs at 924 Gilman in Berkeley
- Security software company McAfee is founded in Santa Clara
- Biotech pharmaceutical company Gilead Sciences is founded in Foster City
- The VTA light rail system (logo pictured) begins operation
- The Sonoma Coast AVA is established
- Nancy Pelosi is elected to California's 5th congressional district
- Cleve Jones and Mike Smith begin work in San Francisco on a quilt project to memorialize people who had died from AIDS
1988
- A gunman kills seven people and wounds four others at ESL Incorporated in Sunnyvale.

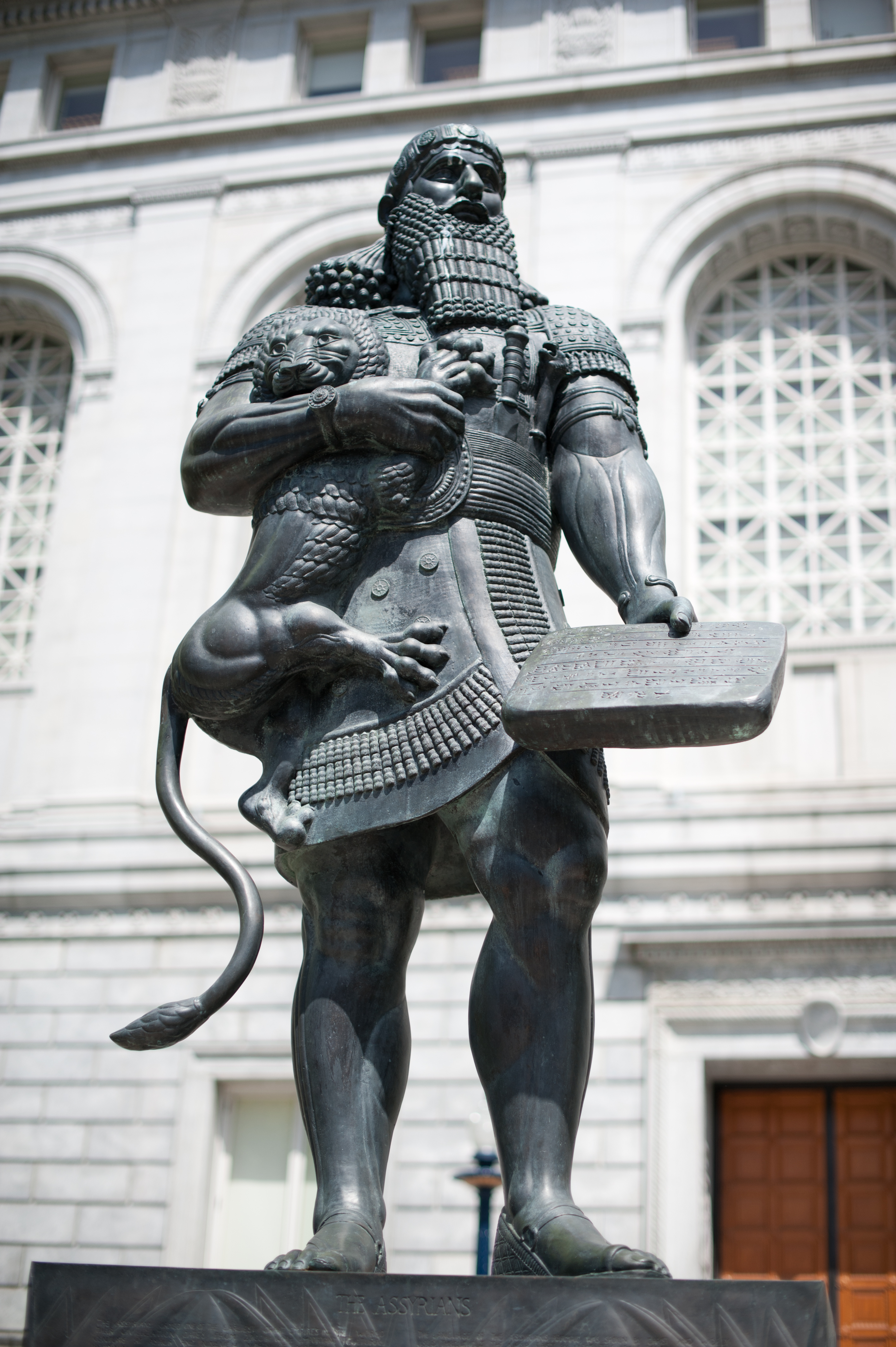

- A sculpture of Ashurbanipal (pictured) is installed at the Civic Center, San Francisco
- The Niles Canyon Railway is reopened in the East Bay
- The Oakland East Bay Symphony is established
- Beat Generation and San Francisco Renaissance poet Robert Duncan dies
1989

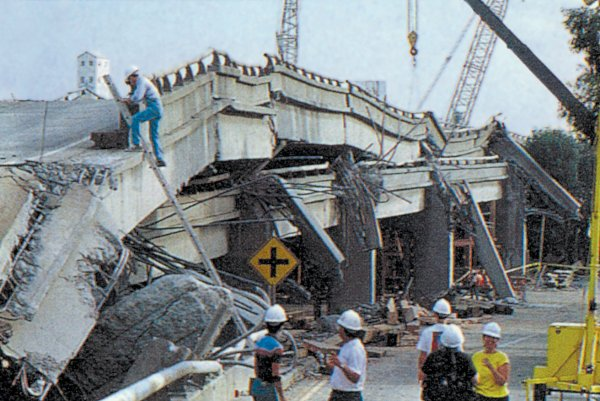
Collapse of the Cypress Street Viaduct

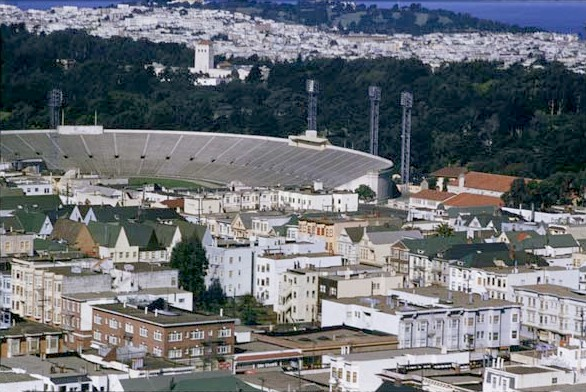
Kezar Stadium

- Pacific Sports Network (now NBC Sports Bay Area) signs on the air in San Francisco
- The Oakland Athletics win the World Series
- An earthquake centered near Loma Prieta in the Santa Cruz Mountains causes significant damage in the Bay Area, kills 63 people throughout Northern California, and injures 3,757 (damage pictured)
- The original Kezar Stadium (pictured) in San Francisco is demolished
- The Santa Clara Valley AVA is established
- The San Francisco 49ers win the Super Bowl for the third time
- California sea lions begin to haul out on docks at San Francisco's Pier 39
1990

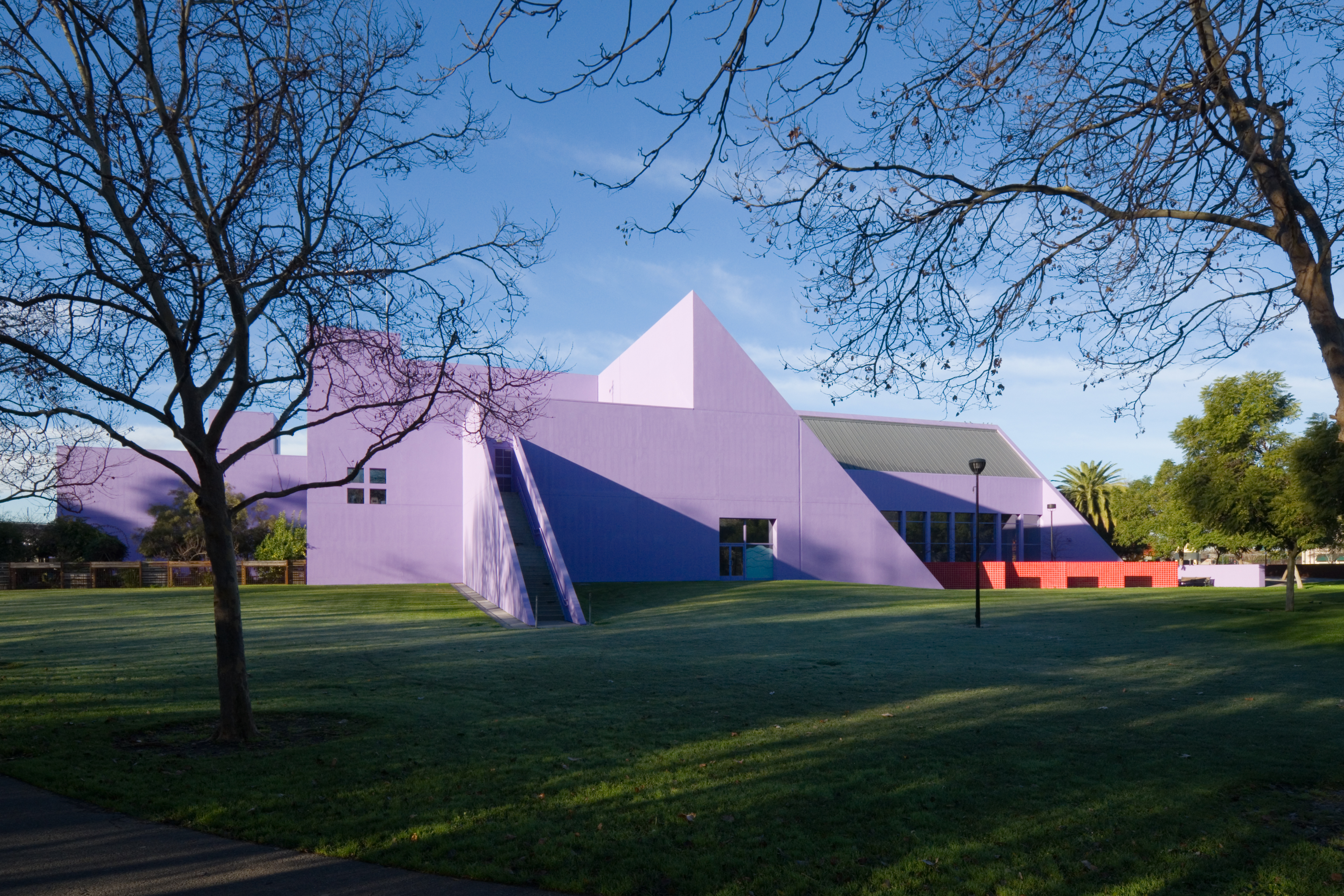

- The Children's Discovery Museum of San Jose (pictured) opens
- Ron Dellums is re-elected to the 8th district of the United States Congress
- Michael Sweeney is elected mayor of Hayward
- The San Francisco 49ers win the Super Bowl for the fourth time
- Long time International Longshore and Warehouse Union president Harry Bridges dies in San Francisco
- The 1990 United States census indicates that San Jose has officially surpassed San Francisco as the most populous city in the Bay Area.
1991

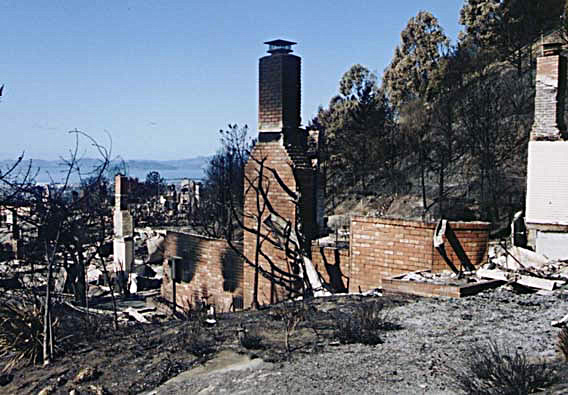
Remains of houses destroyed by the fire

• The Oakland and Berkeley Hills are hit by a firestorm (damage pictured, left)
• Frank Jordan is elected mayor of San Francisco
• Groundbreaking ceremonies take place at the AIDS Memorial Grove in San Francisco (logo pictured, right)
• San Francisco pornography and striptease club pioneer Jim Mitchell kills his brother and business partner Artie in Marin County
• Apple Computer introduces the PowerBook line of subnotebook personal computers

1992

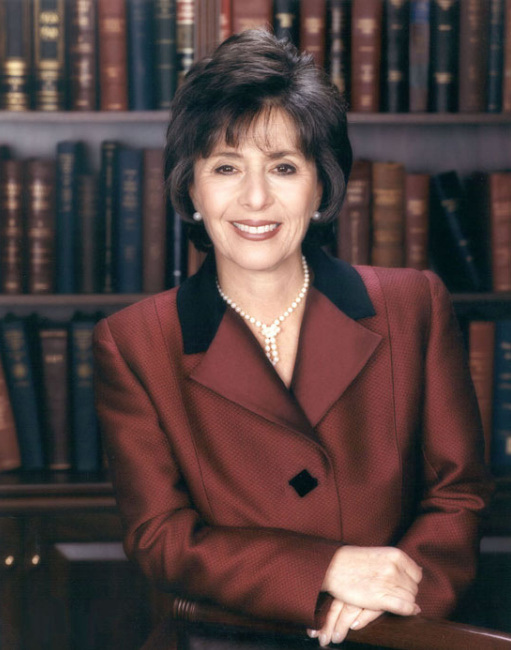
Barbara Boxer

- Barbara Boxer (pictured) is elected to the United States Senate
- Nicholas C. Petris is re-elected to the 9th State Senate district
- Lynn Woolsey is elected to the 6th congressional district
1993

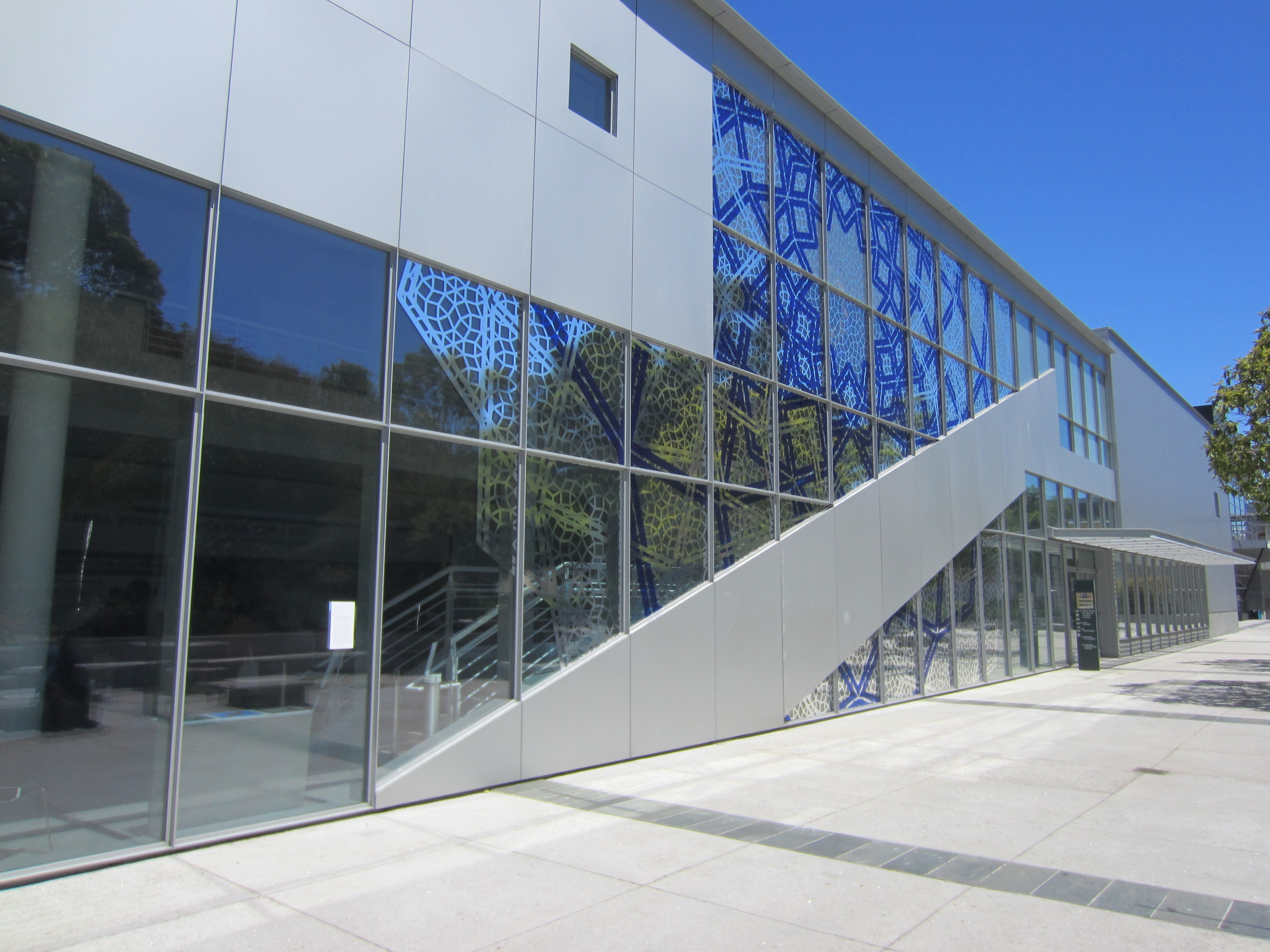
Yerba Buena Center exterior

- Eight people are killed and six others injured by a gunman at the 101 California Street building in San Francisco
- Polly Hannah Klaas is kidnapped from her home in Petaluma and subsequently strangled
- The magazine Wired begins publishing in San Francisco
- The Yerba Buena Center for the Arts (pictured) opens in San Francisco
1994

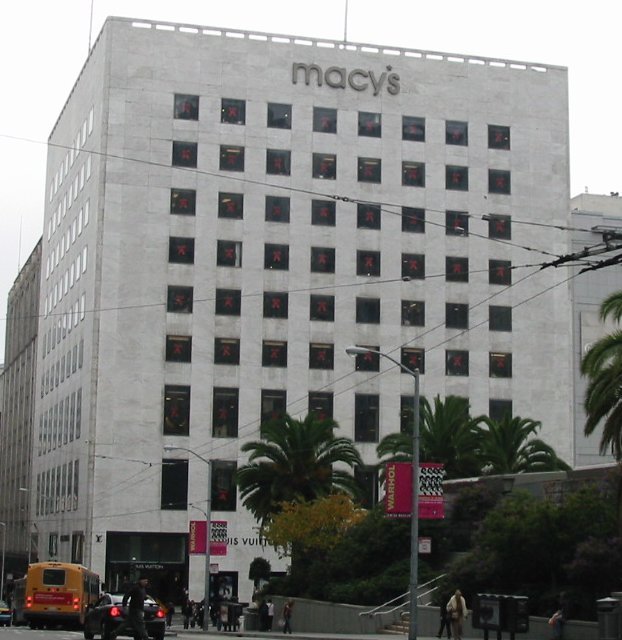
I. Magnin building in San Francisco (now Macy's)

- Employees of San Francisco's two major daily newspapers, the San Francisco Chronicle and The San Francisco Examiner, walk off the job for eleven days
- The San Francisco-based I. Magnin department store chain is liquidated (former SF building pictured)
- Yahoo! is founded in Sunnyvale
1995

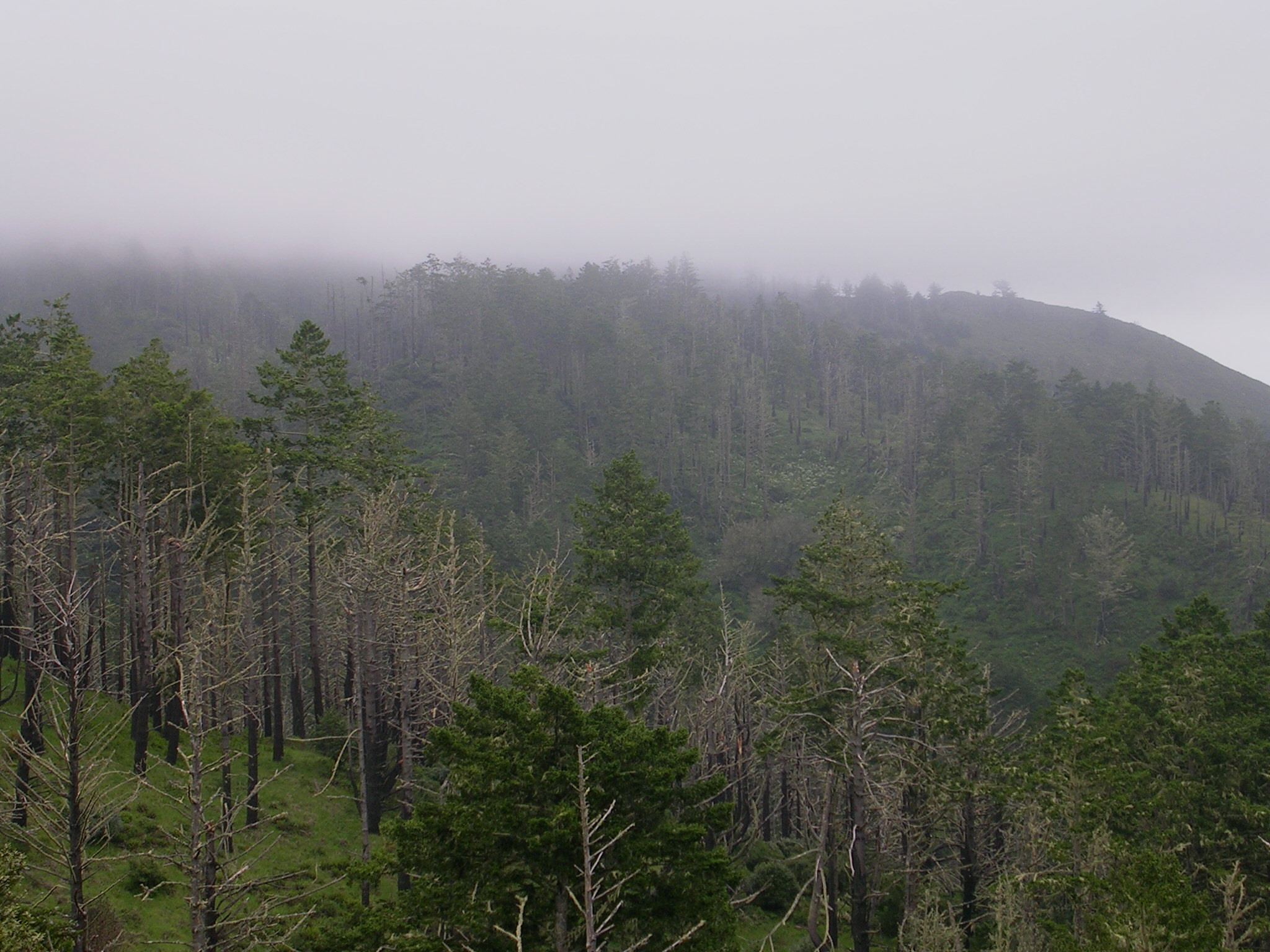
damage from the Mount Vision fire

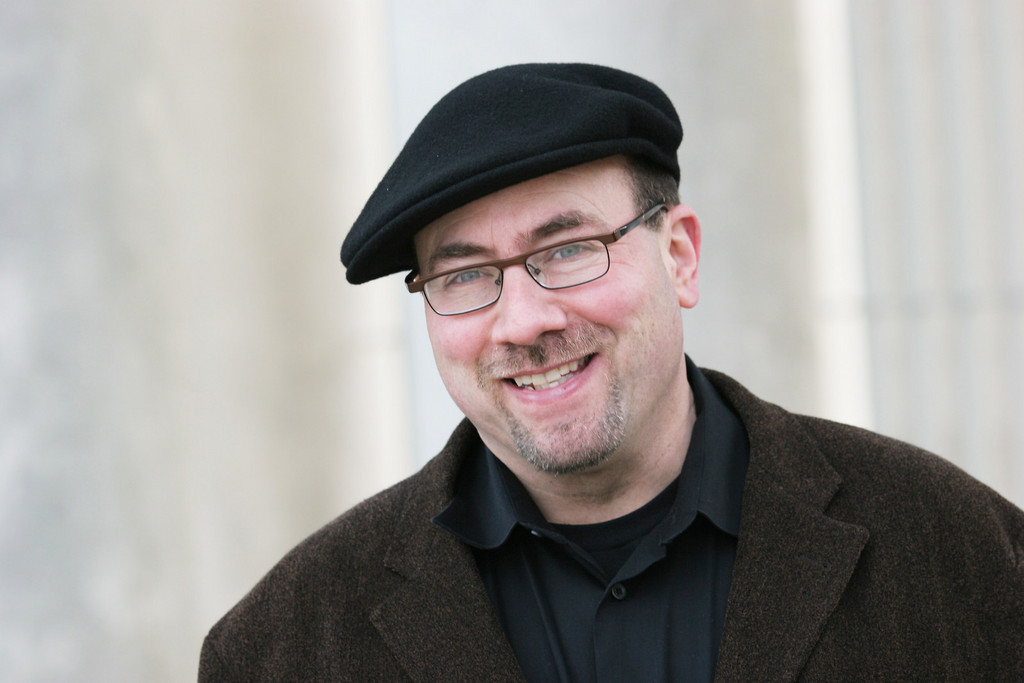
Craig Newmark, the founder of Craigslist, in 2006

- The Mount Vision fire (damage pictured) burns 12,000 acres (49 km^{2}) at the Point Reyes National Seashore
- Willie Brown is elected mayor of San Francisco
- Craigslist is founded by Craig Newmark (pictured) in San Francisco
- The San Jose Earthquakes soccer team is established
- The St. Helena AVA is established
- The Salon website is established in San Francisco
- The San Francisco 49ers win the Super Bowl for the fifth time
- Grateful Dead co-founder, guitarist and singer/songwriter Jerry Garcia dies in Marin County
1996
- The Computer History Museum (pictured) is established in Mountain View
- The Internet Archive is established in San Francisco
- San Francisco Chronicle columnist Herb Caen wins a Special Pulitzer Prize for "his extraordinary and continuing contribution as a voice and conscience of his city"
1997

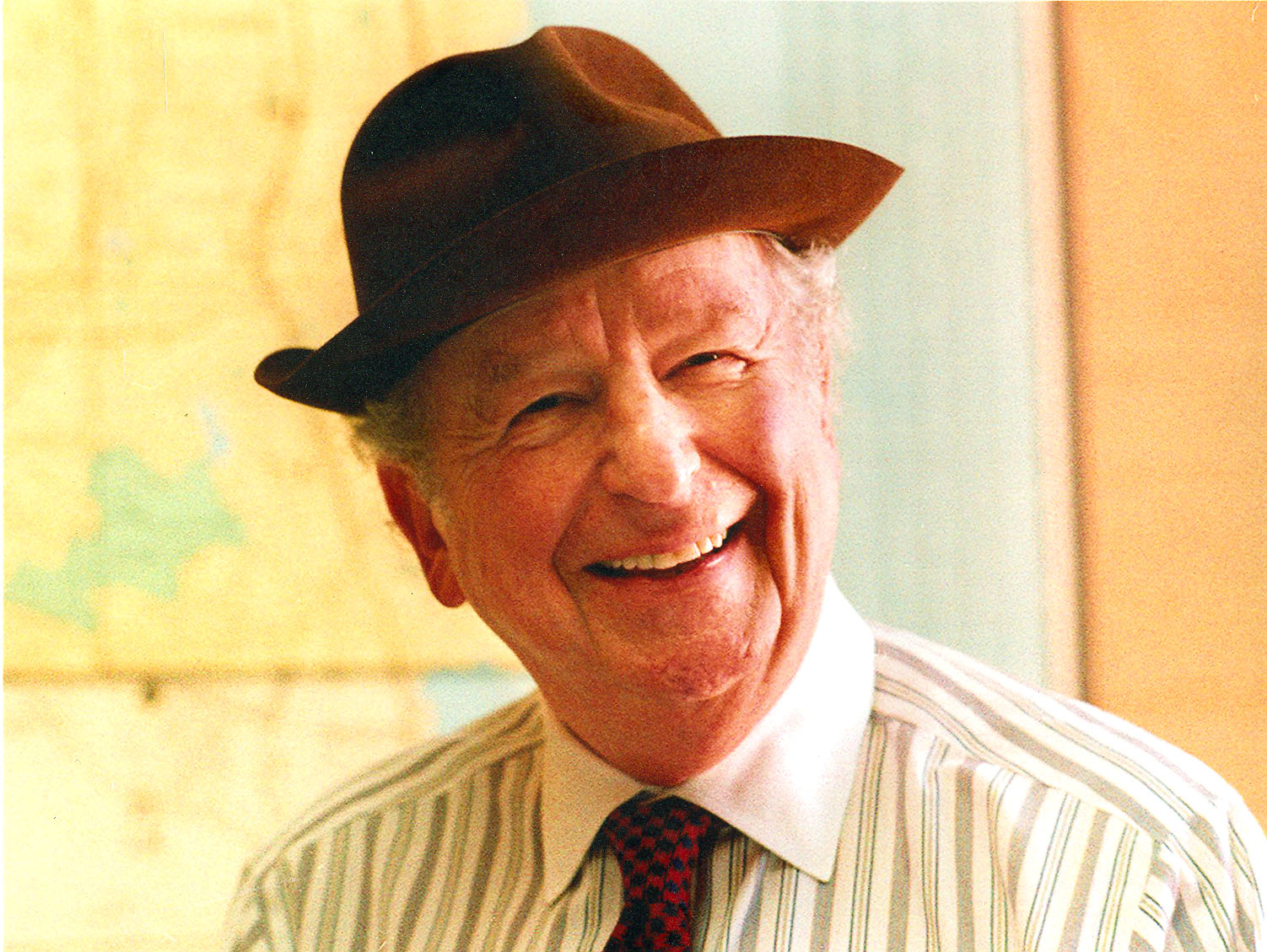
Herb Caen

- Stanley B. Prusiner of the University of California, San Francisco and the University of California, Berkeley is awarded the Nobel Prize in Physiology or Medicine for his research into prions
- The Silicon Graphics campus in Mountain View is completed
- Netflix is founded in Los Gatos
- San Francisco Chronicle columnist Herb Caen (pictured) dies
- Steve Jobs returns as CEO of Apple Computer
- Naval Air Station Alameda is closed on 25 April.
1998

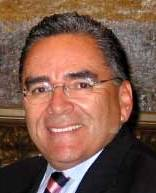
Mayor Ron Gonzales

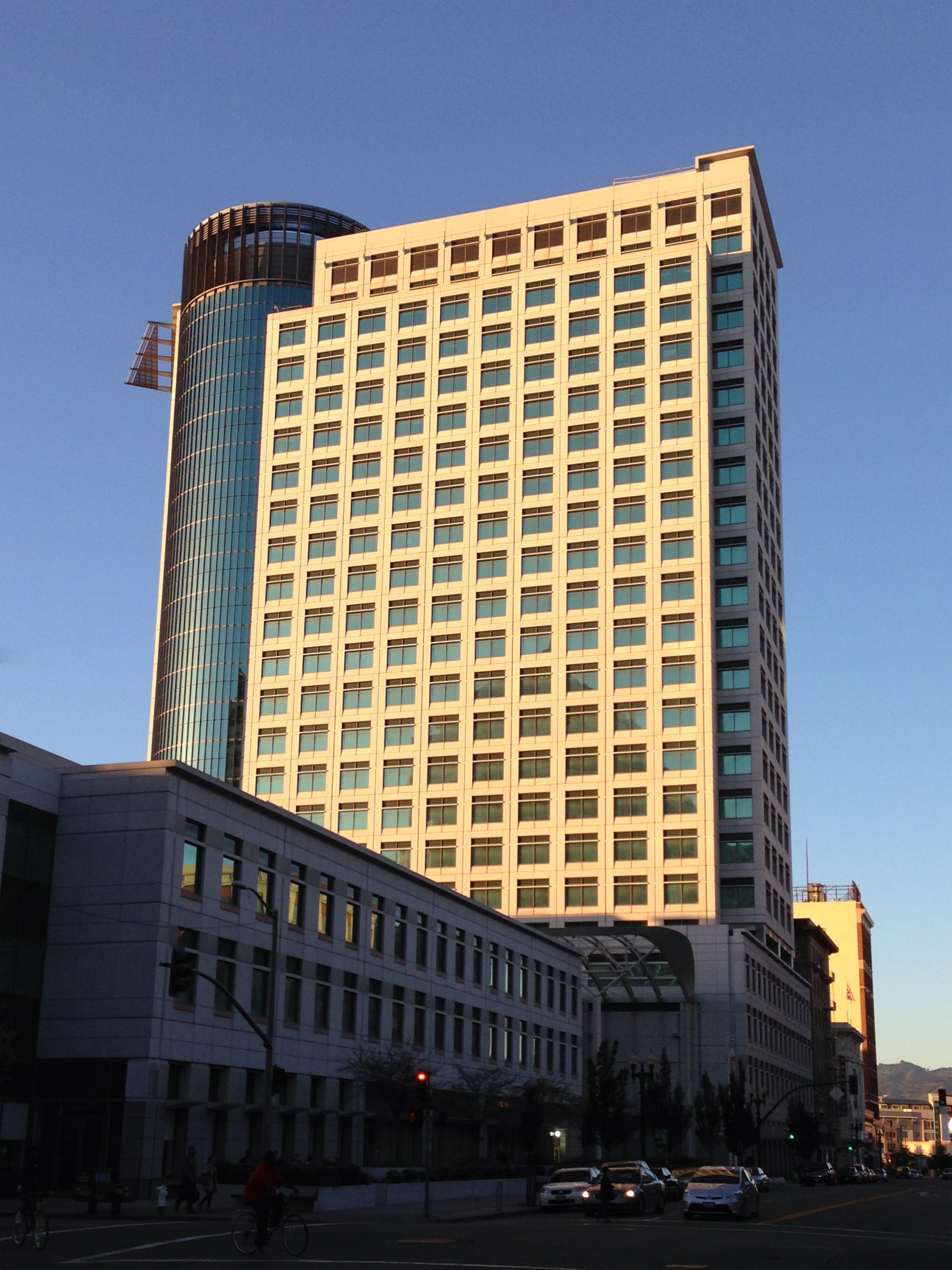
Elihu M. Harris Office Building

- Google is founded in Menlo Park
- The Sonoma Valley Museum of Art is founded in Sonoma
- Ron Gonzales (pictured) is elected mayor of San Jose
- Jerry Brown is elected mayor of Oakland
- The Elihu M. Harris State Office Building (pictured) in Oakland is completed
- Apple Computer introduces the iMac
1999

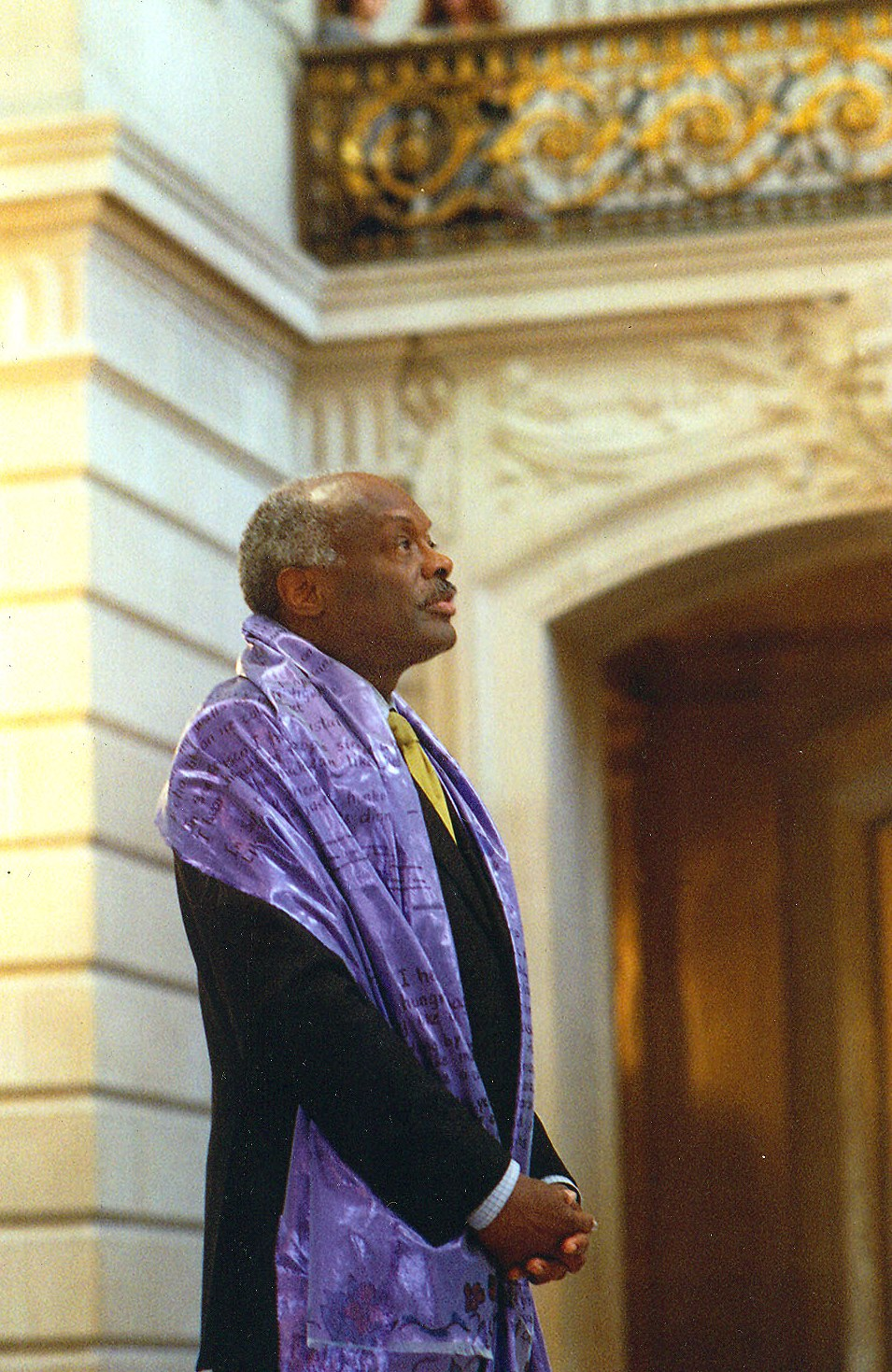
Brown in 1996

- Willie Brown (pictured) is re-elected mayor of San Francisco
- The San Francisco Bay AVA is designated
- The Union Landing Shopping Center in Union City is completed
2000

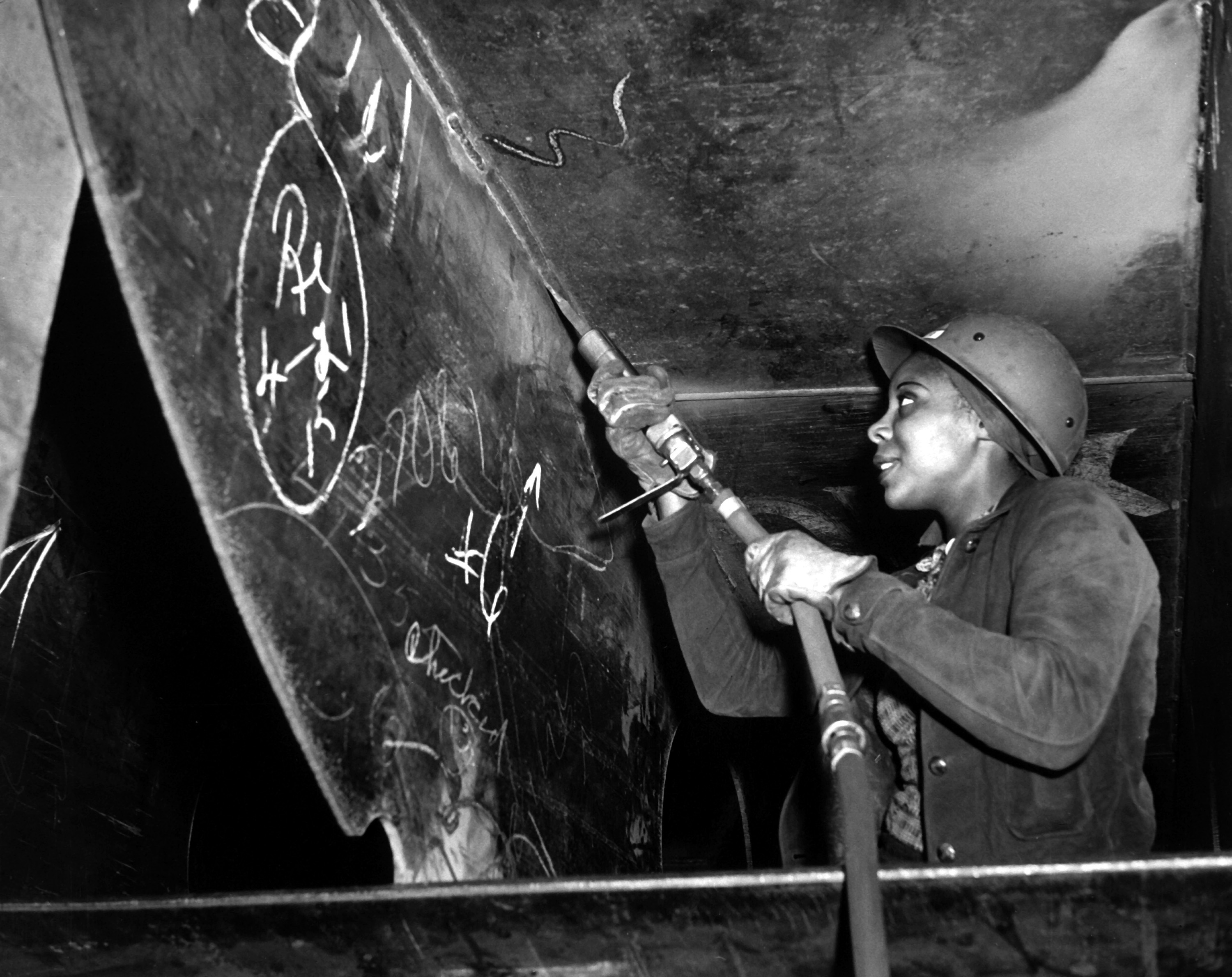
Eastine Cowner, a former waitress, works on a ship under construction at Richmond, California

- AT&T Park opens in San Francisco
- Pandora Radio is founded in Oakland
- The Rosie the Riveter/World War II Home Front National Historical Park is designated in Richmond (historic photo shown)
- Peanuts creator Charles M. Schulz dies at his home in Santa Rosa
- The Dot-com bubble, affecting many Silicon Valley internet companies, peaks

== 21st century ==
2001

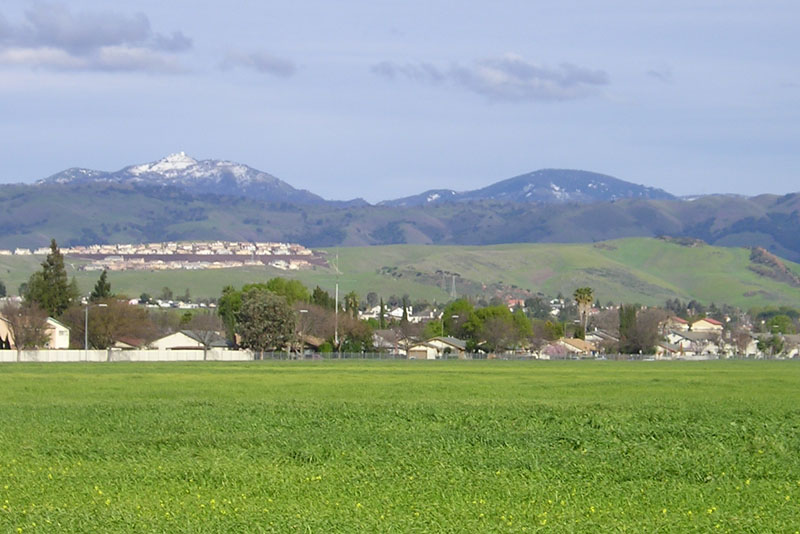
2006 snowfall

- 30 inches (76 cm) of snow falls on Mount Hamilton (pictured)
- The collapse of the Dot-com bubble accelerates
- City Lights Bookstore is declared a San Francisco Designated Landmark
- Michael Chabon's 2000 novel The Amazing Adventures of Kavalier & Clay wins the Pulitzer Prize for Fiction
- Apple, Inc. releases iTunes, and later in the year introduces the iPod

2002

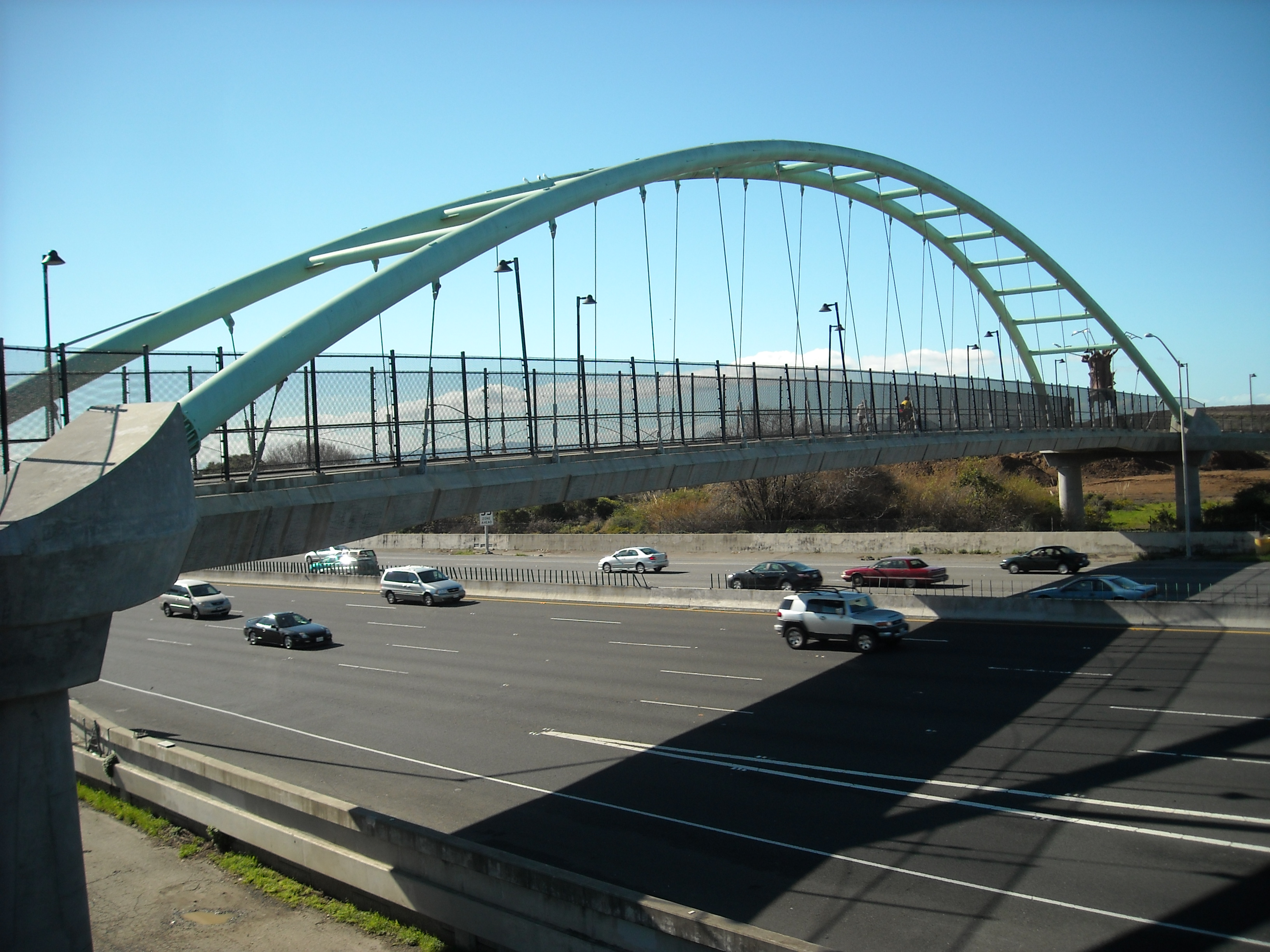
View of the bridge looking east

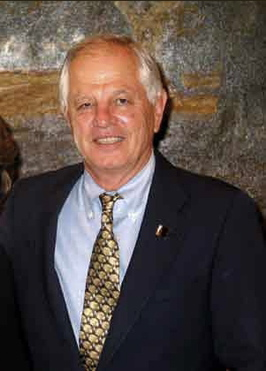

- Gwen Araujo is murdered in Newark
- Laci Peterson is murdered at an unknown location along the San Francisco Bay
- The Berkeley I-80 bridge (pictured) opens
- The JPMorgan Chase Building in San Francisco is completed
- Tom Bates (pictured) is elected mayor of Berkeley
- The Paramount residential tower in San Francisco is completed
- 555 City Center, a skyscraper in Oakland, is completed

2003

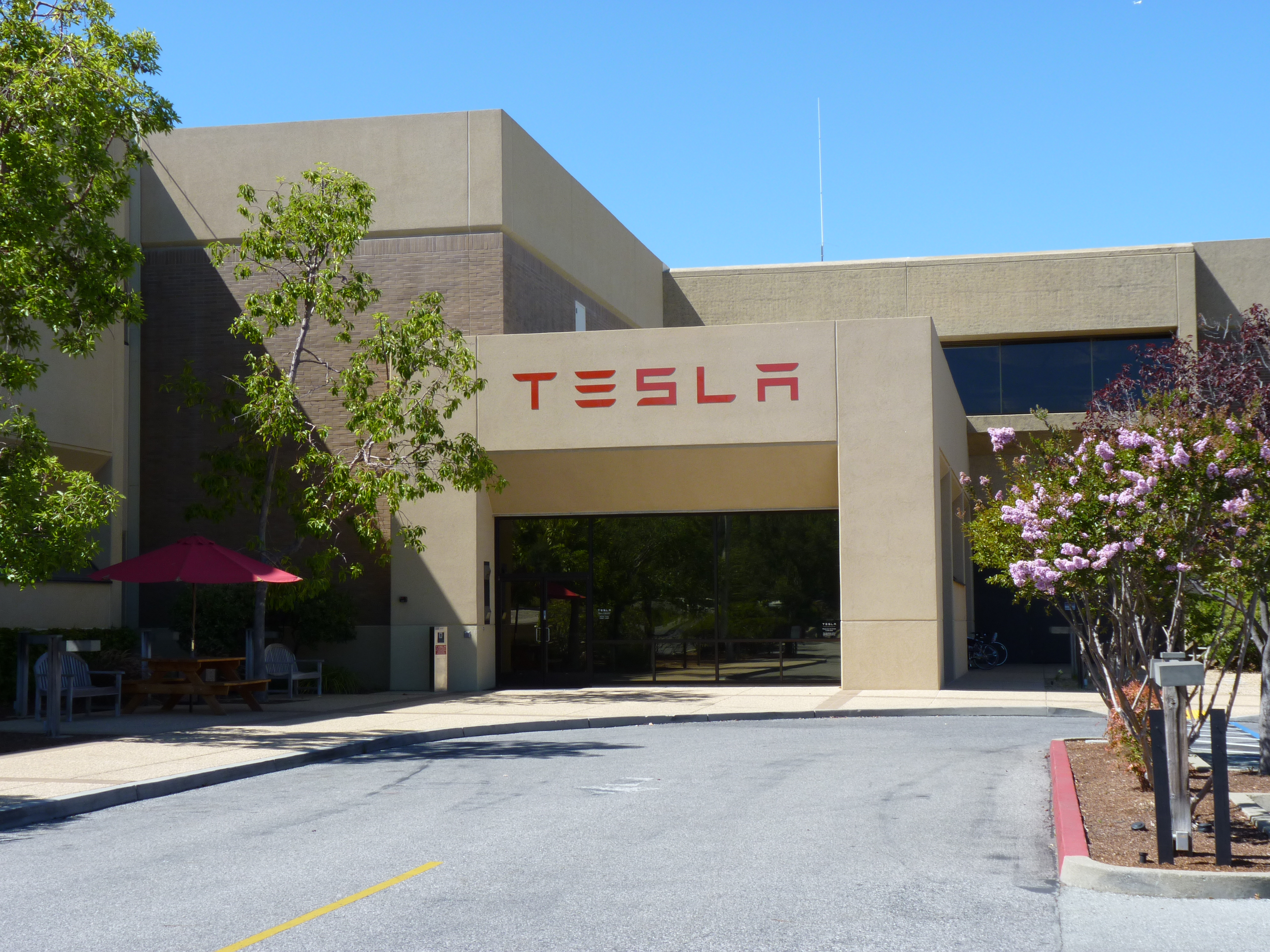
Tesla headquarters

- Gavin Newsom is elected mayor of San Francisco
- The Los Esteros Critical Energy Facility goes online in San Jose
- Tesla Motors (pictured) is founded in Palo Alto
- Adobe World Headquarters, Almaden tower in San Jose is completed

2004

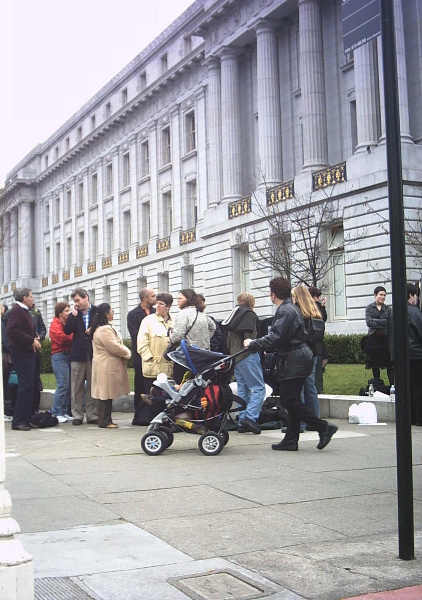
The line of same-sex couples applying for marriage licenses, stretching for blocks around San Francisco's City Hall in February 2004

- San Francisco mayor Gavin Newsom directs the city-county clerk to begin issuing marriage licenses to same-sex couples (applicants pictured)
- Bob Wasserman is elected mayor of Fremont
- Johan Klehs is elected to California's 18th State Assembly district

2005

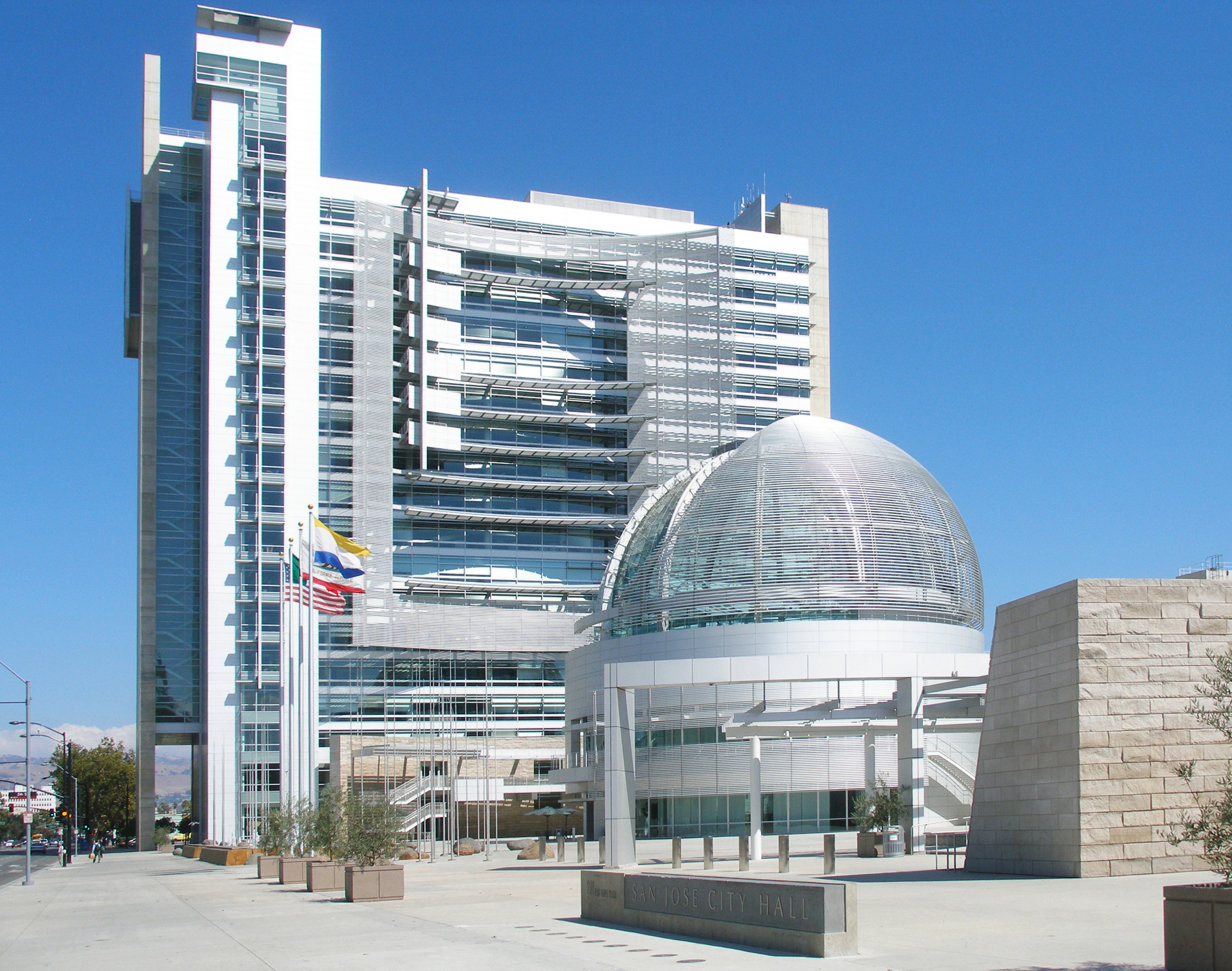

- Thin-film solar cell manufacturer Solyndra (logo pictured) is founded in Fremont
- YouTube is founded in San Bruno by three founders, which are Steve Chen, Chad Hurley, and Jawed Karim
- The new San Jose City Hall (pictured) is completed
- The Sobrato Office Tower in San Jose is completed

2006

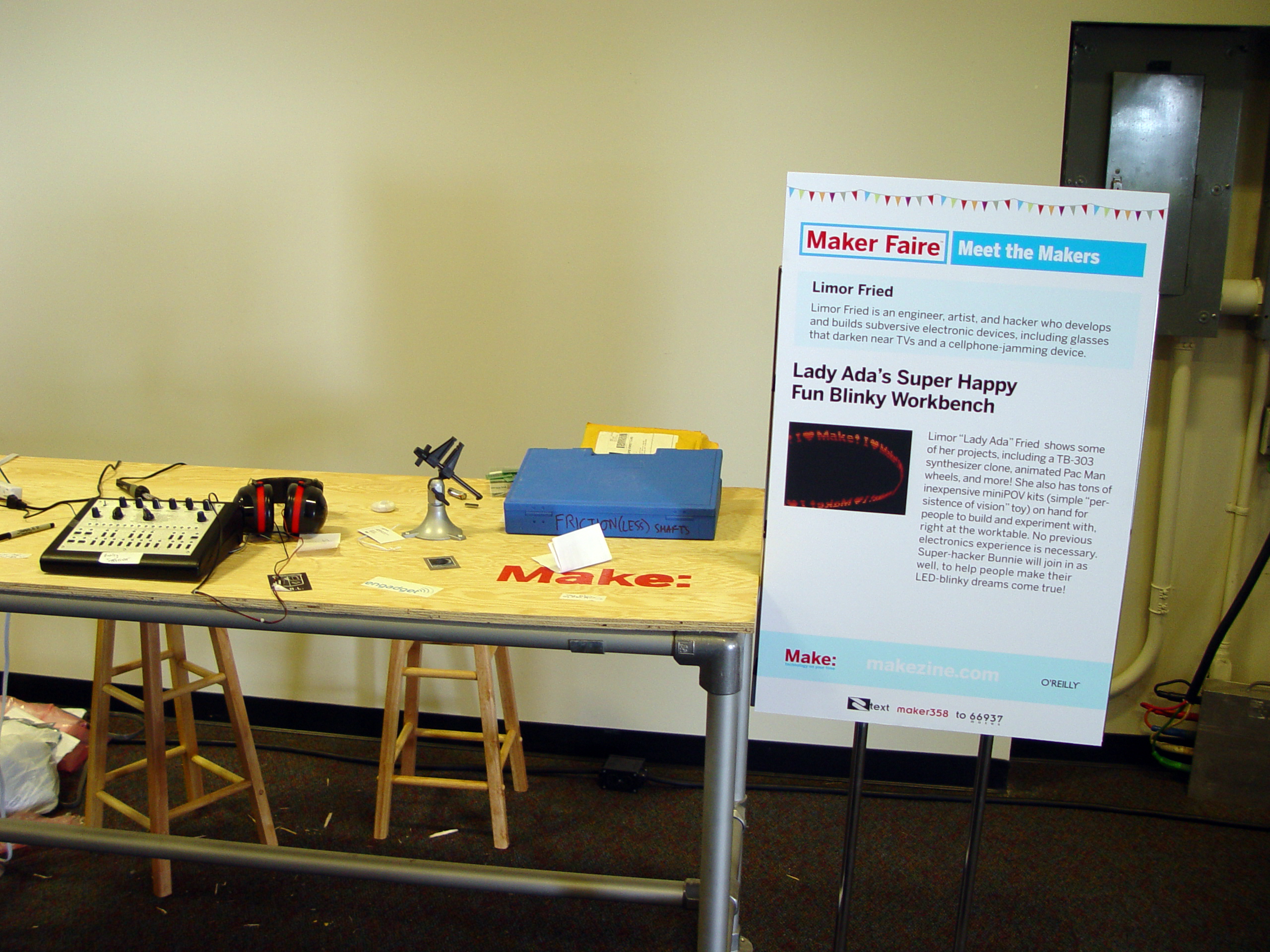
Exhibit at the 2006 Maker Faire

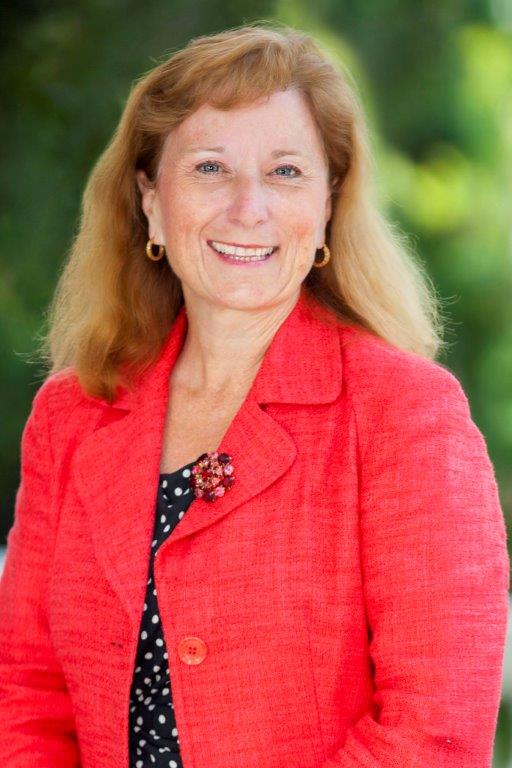

- The first Maker Faire (exhibit pictured) takes place at the San Mateo County Event Center
- Microblogging site Twitter is founded in San Francisco
- Knight Ridder, a media company based in San Jose, is purchased by The McClatchy Company
- Gayle McLaughlin is elected mayor of Richmond
- Chuck Reed is elected mayor of San Jose
- Ron Dellums is elected mayor of Oakland
- Ellen Corbett (pictured) is elected to the 10th State Senate district
- Leland Yee is elected to the 8th State Senate district
- George Smoot at the University of California, Berkeley is awarded the Nobel Prize in Physics, with John C. Mather for work that led to the "discovery of the black body form and anisotropy of the cosmic microwave background radiation."

2007

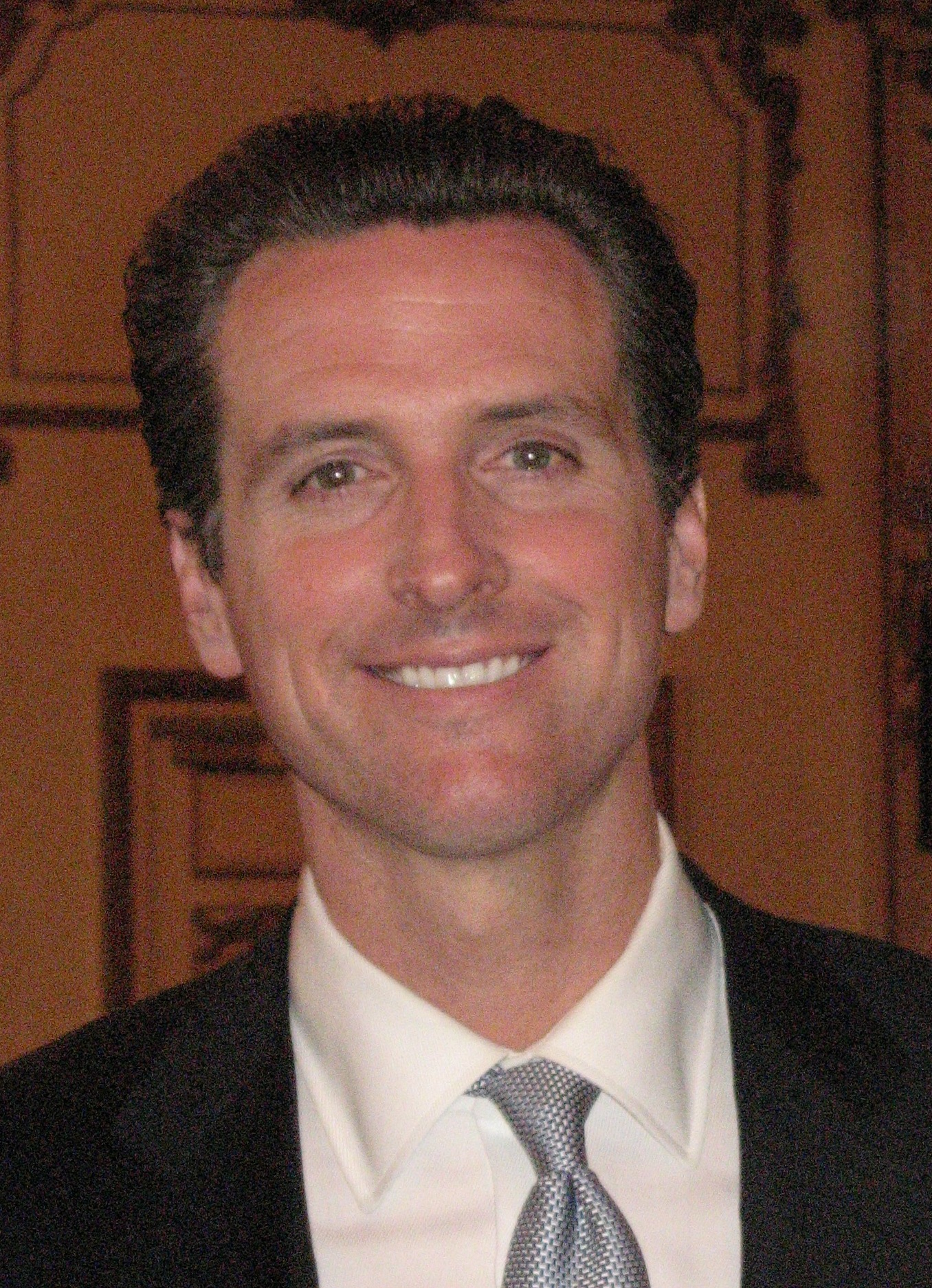
Mayor Gavin Newsom

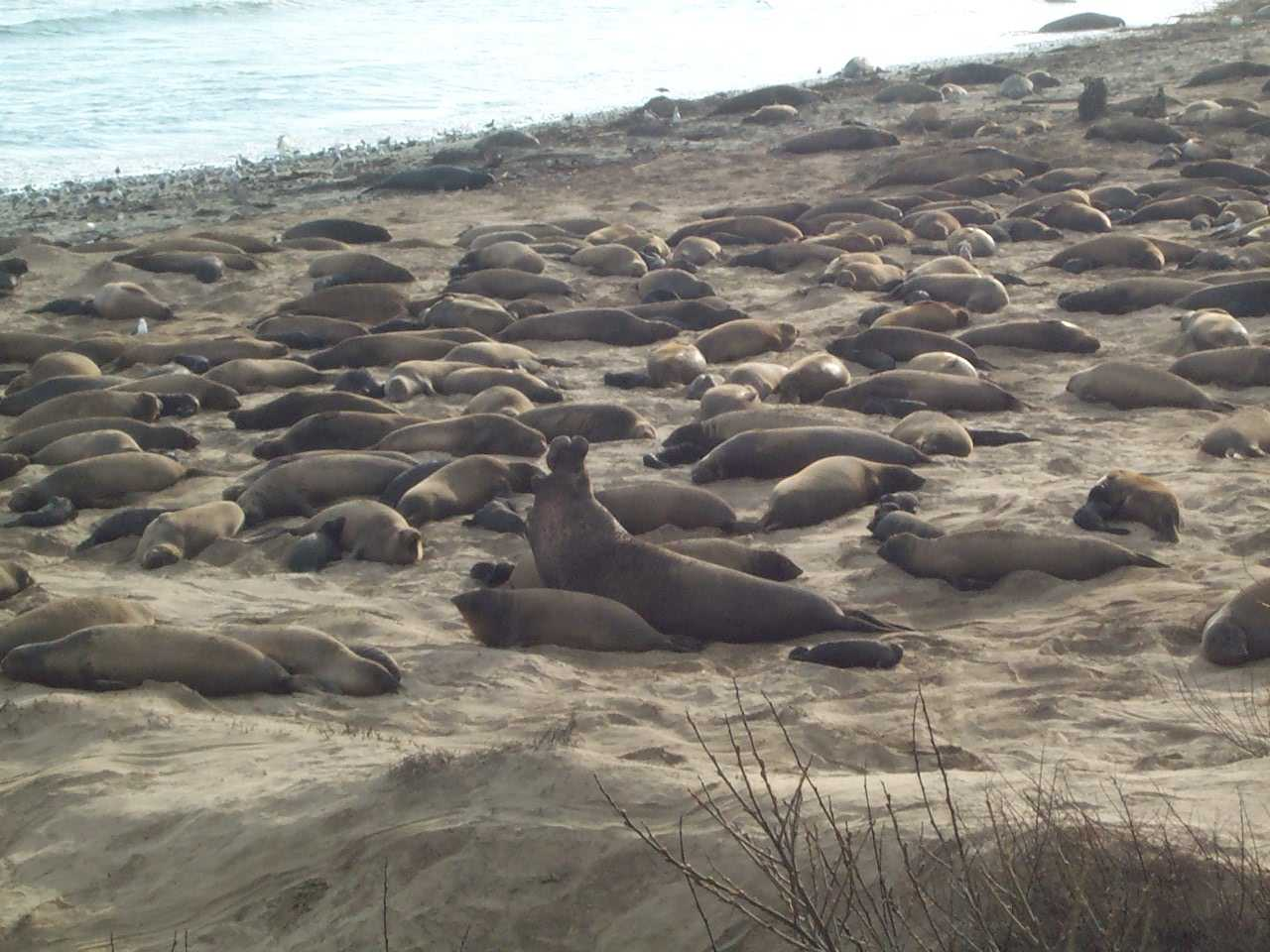
Elephant seals at Año Nuevo during the mating season in early February

- Members of Code Pink begin protesting in front of a United States Marine Corps Recruiting Center in Berkeley
- Teachers go on strike against the Hayward Unified School District
- A tiger escapes from her open-air enclosure at the San Francisco Zoo and attacks three visitors, killing one
- Village Music in Mill Valley closes
- Gavin Newsom (pictured) is re-elected mayor of San Francisco
- The Año Nuevo State Marine Conservation Area is established (elephant seals pictured)
- The Greyhound Rock State Marine Conservation Area, adjacent to Año Nuevo, is established
- Zodiac, a film about the Zodiac killer, debuts
- The container ship Cosco Busan strikes a base tower of the San Francisco–Oakland Bay Bridge in thick fog, spilling 53,569 US gal (202,780 L) of heavy fuel oil into San Francisco Bay
- Apple Inc. introduces the iPhone

2008

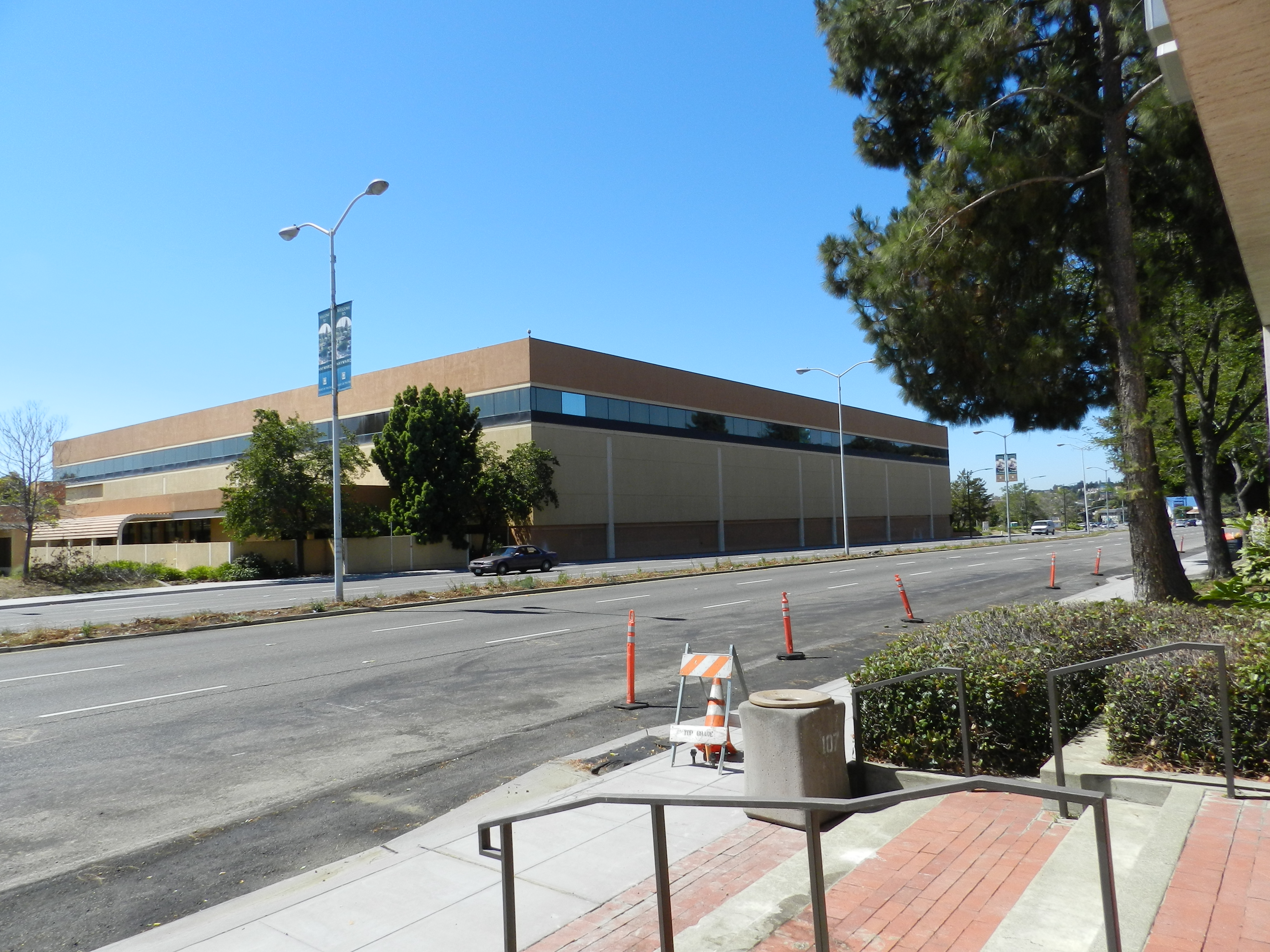
Mervyn's former headquarters, Hayward

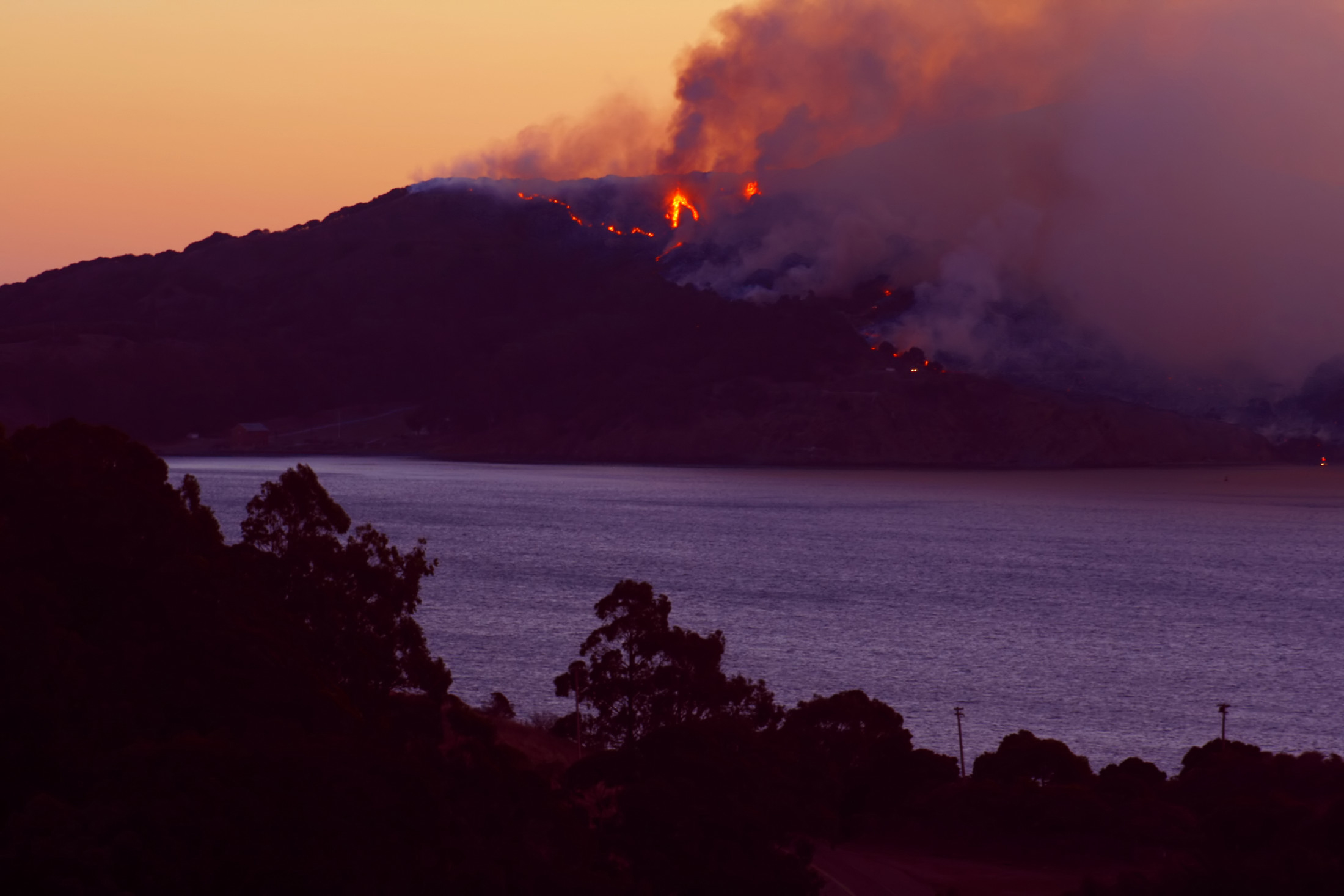
The fire at about 7 a.m. on October 13, 2008

- Three people are fatally shot at the office of SiPort, a start-up company in Silicon Valley
- The Hayward-based Mervyn's department store chain is liquidated (headquarters pictured)
- The Outside Lands Music and Arts Festival premieres at Golden Gate Park in San Francisco
- A fire on Angel Island (pictured) scorches a third of the island
- One Rincon Hill South Tower in San Francisco is completed
- The 555 Mission Street office tower in San Francisco is completed
- The 88, a residential skyscraper in San Jose, is completed
- Tesla Motors introduces the Tesla Roadster, the first fully electric sports car
- Vintner Robert Mondavi dies in Yountville

2009

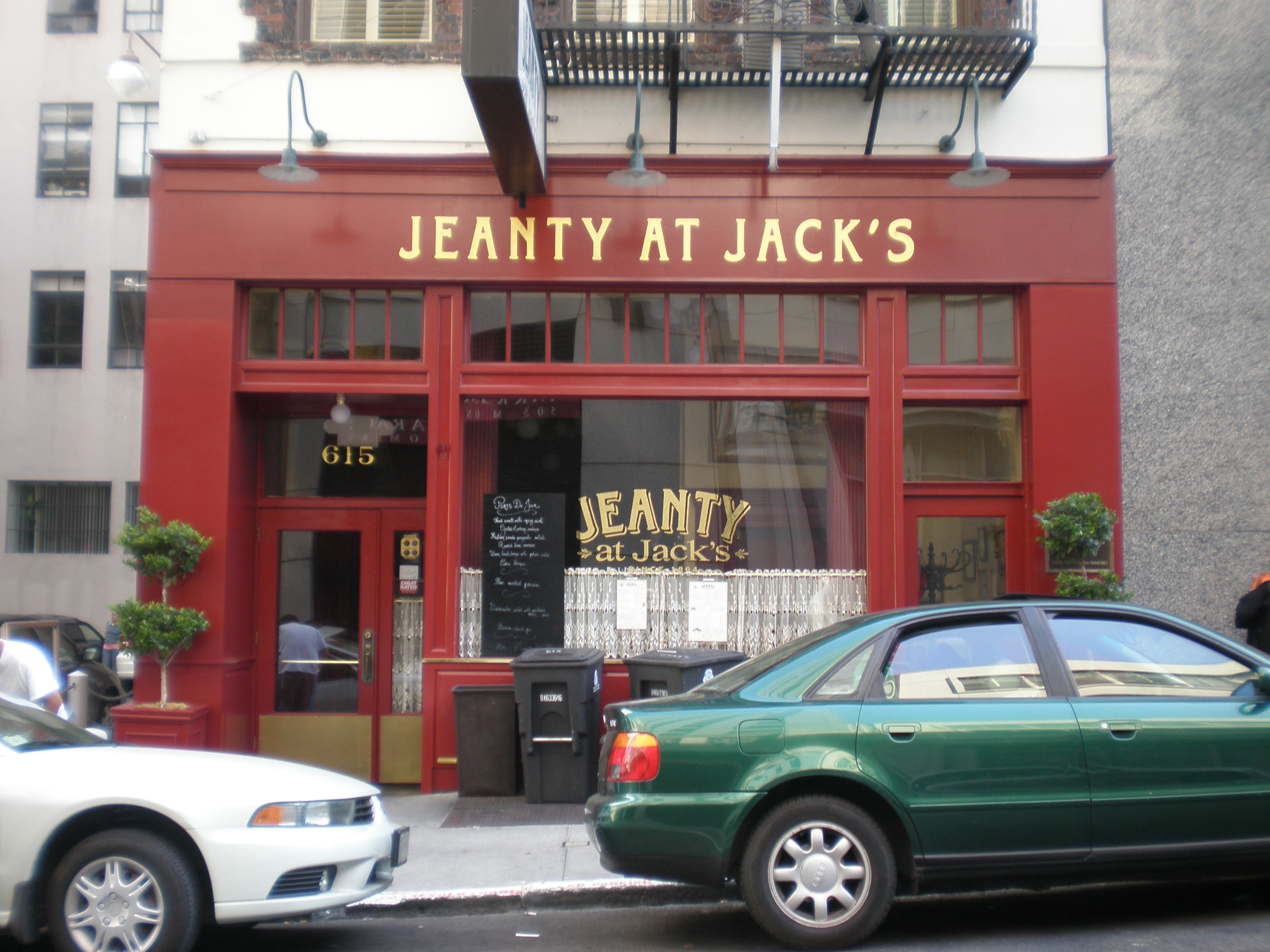

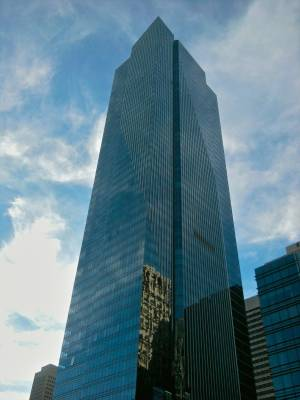

- Oscar Grant is fatally shot by BART Police officer Johannes Mehserle
- A convicted felon shoots and kills four Oakland police officers
- Jack's Restaurant (pictured) closes in San Francisco after operating since 1863
- Millennium Tower (pictured) in San Francisco is completed
- The Infinity complex, consisting of 2 high-rise towers and 2 low-rise buildings in San Francisco, is completed

2010

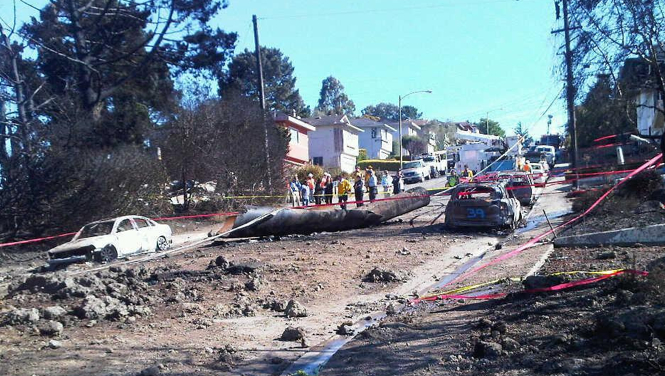
Damage from San Bruno pipeline explosion

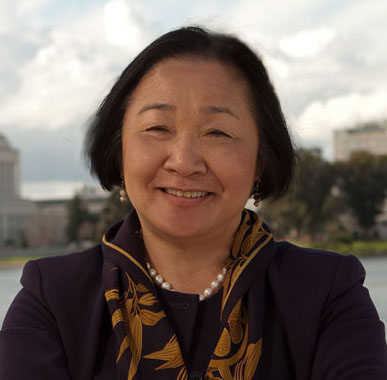
Jean Quan

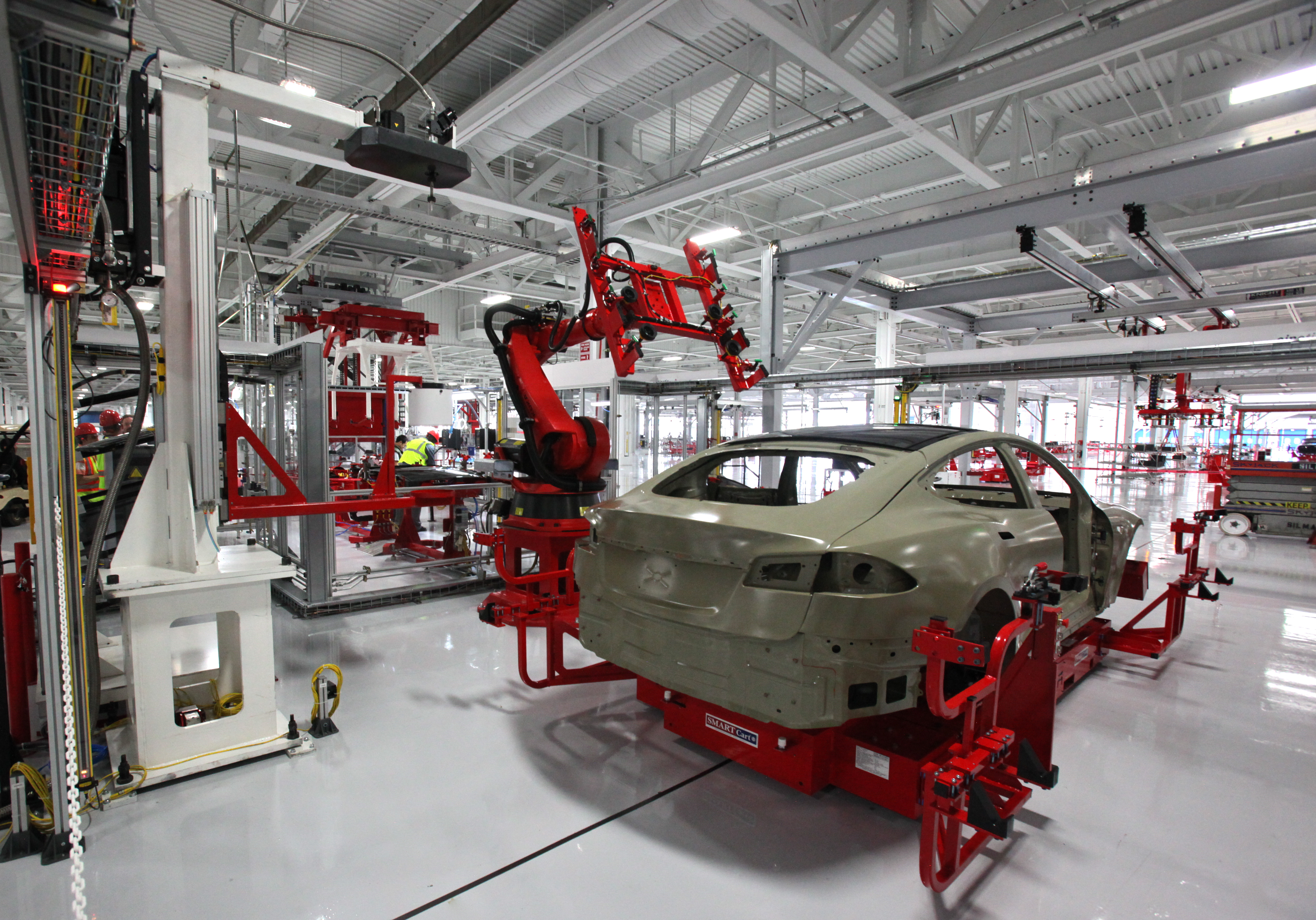
Tesla Factory interior

- A fight on an AC Transit Bus is recorded on video and uploaded to YouTube
- A pipeline explosion in San Bruno (pictured) registers a shock wave equivalent to a magnitude 1.1 earthquake
- Sun Microsystems is acquired by Oracle
- The Calistoga AVA (wine region) is established
- Onizuka Air Force Station in Santa Clara County closes
- Jean Quan (pictured) is elected mayor of Oakland
- Michael Sweeney is re-elected mayor of Hayward
- The San Francisco Giants win the World Series
- The NUMMI automobile manufacturing plant in Fremont closes, then reopens as the Tesla Factory (pictured)

2011

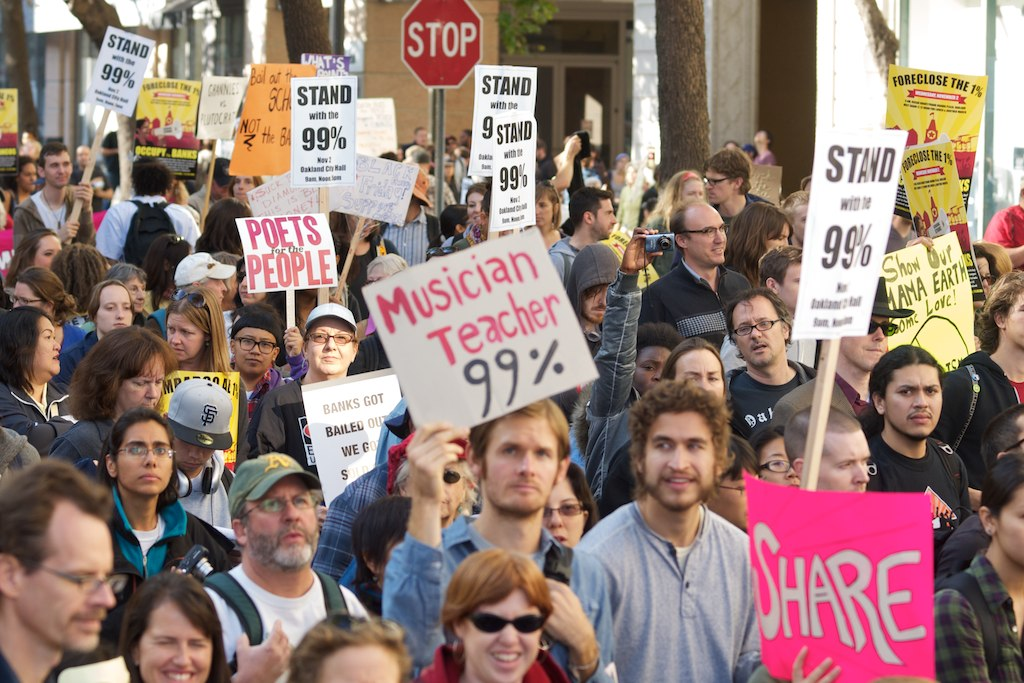

- Steve Jobs dies at his home in Palo Alto
- Oakland Raiders owner Al Davis dies in his suite at the Oakland Airport Hilton Hotel
- A gunman kills 3 co-workers and wounds 6 others at Permanente Quarry in Cupertino
- Occupy Oakland protests and demonstrations (pictured) at Frank H. Ogawa Plaza
- Ed Lee is elected mayor of San Francisco
- Fremont solar panel manufacturer Solyndra closes
- Former San Francisco District Attorney Kamala Harris begins serving as California's first female Attorney General

2012

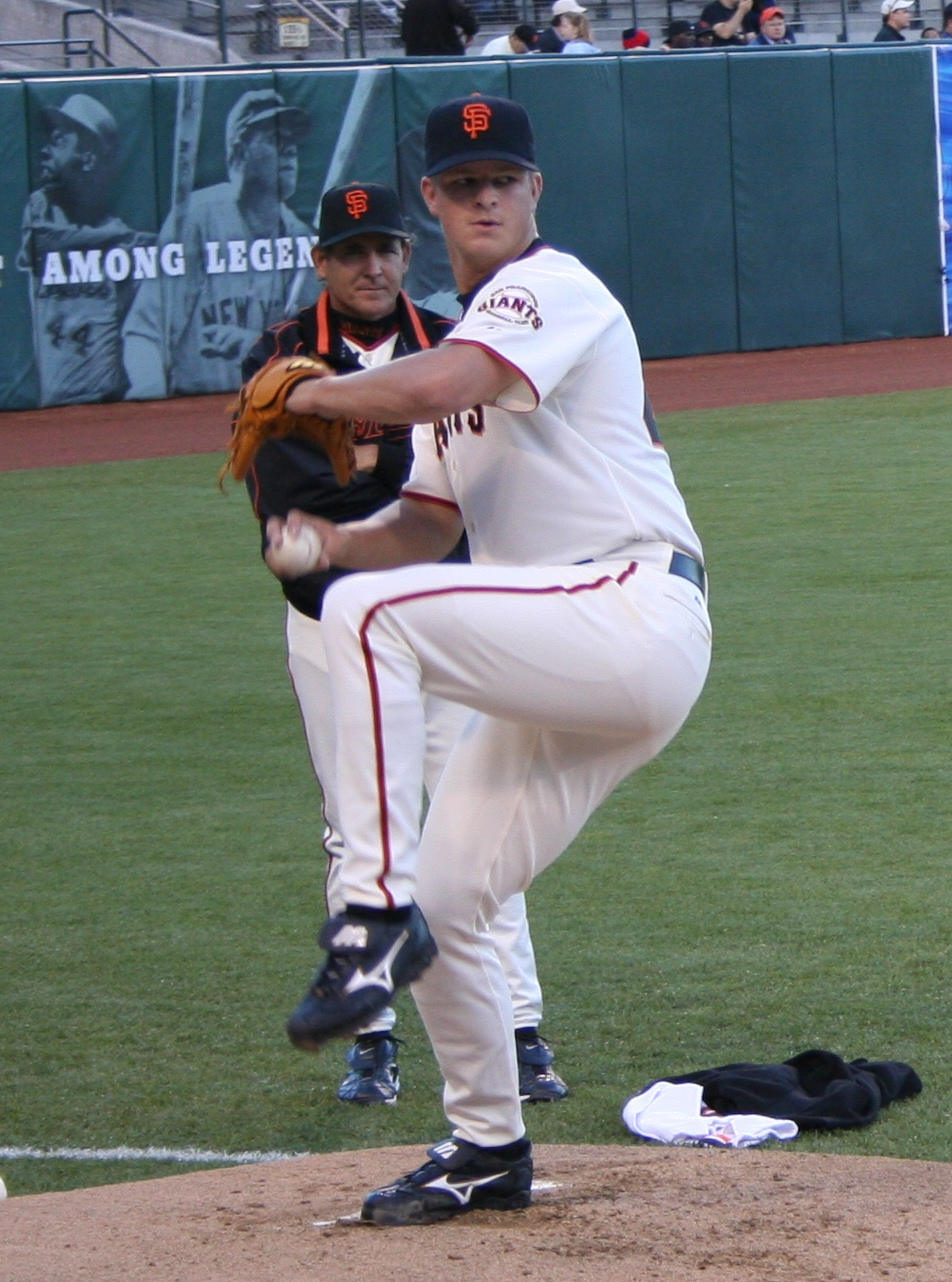
Matt Cain

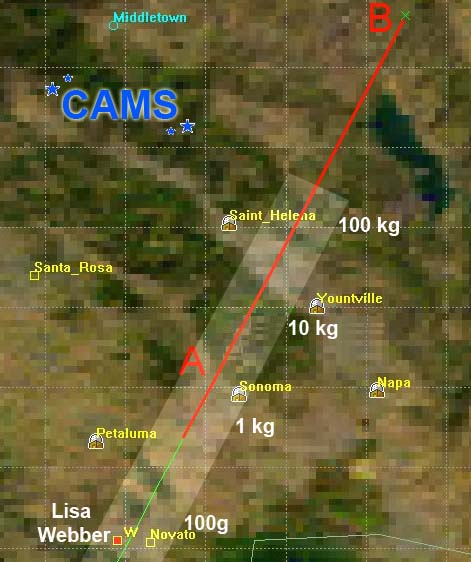
Novato meteorite trajectory

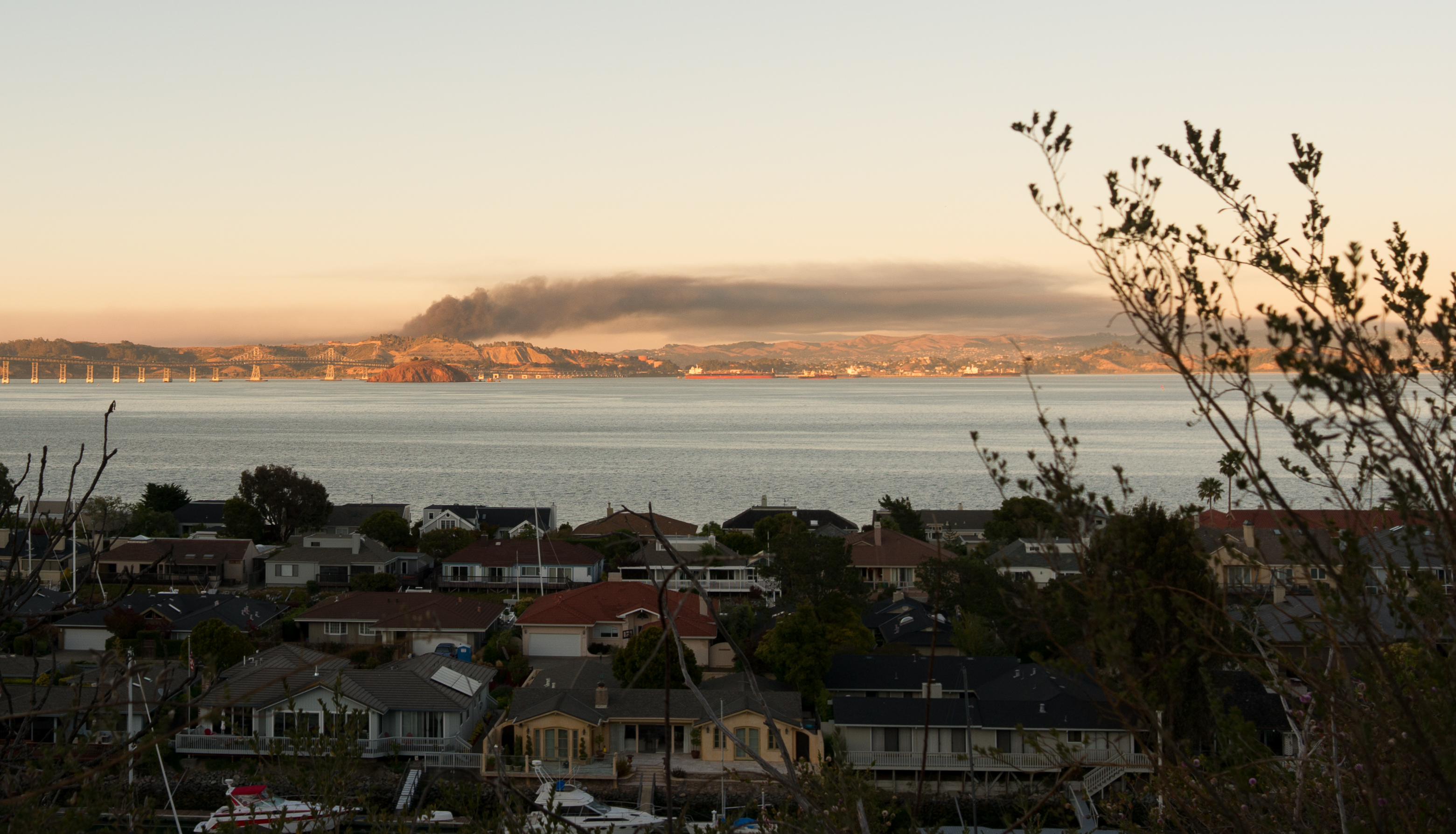
Chevron Refinery Fire

- The San Francisco Giants win the World Series
- Matt Cain (pictured) pitches a perfect game at AT&T Park in San Francisco
- Five people are found dead at a home in San Francisco's Ingleside neighborhood
- The Novato meteorite (trajectory pictured) crosses the North Bay
- A gunman kills seven people inside Oikos University in Oakland
- The South San Francisco Ferry Terminal opens
- Nadia Lockyer resigns as Alameda County Supervisor
- Gus Morrison is appointed mayor of Fremont
- Eric Swalwell is elected to California's 15th congressional district
- A large fire erupts at the Chevron Richmond Refinery (smoke plume pictured), and a shelter in place order is given by Contra Costa County
- Tesla Motors introduces the Tesla Model S

2013

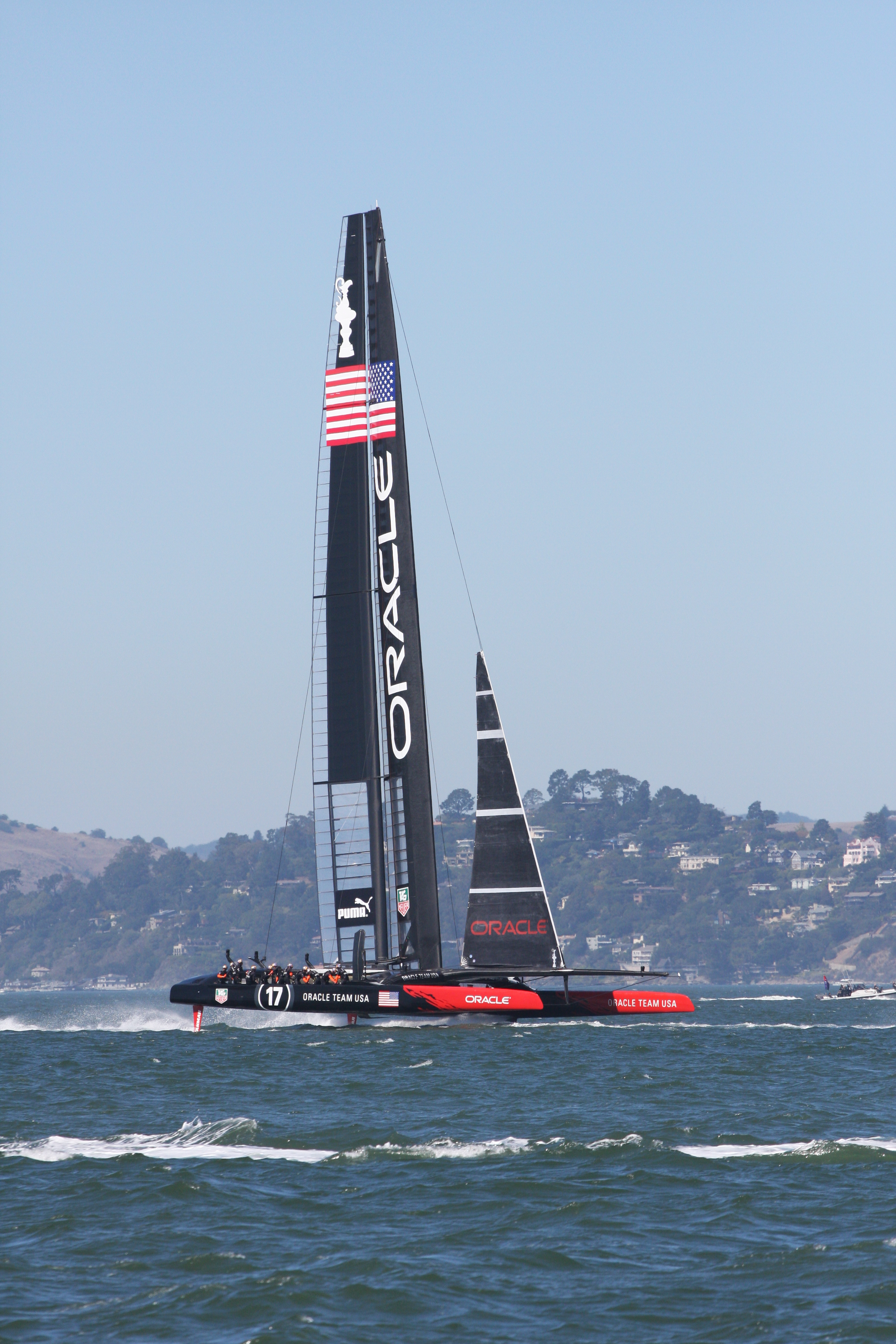
Oracle Team USA, 2013 America's Cup

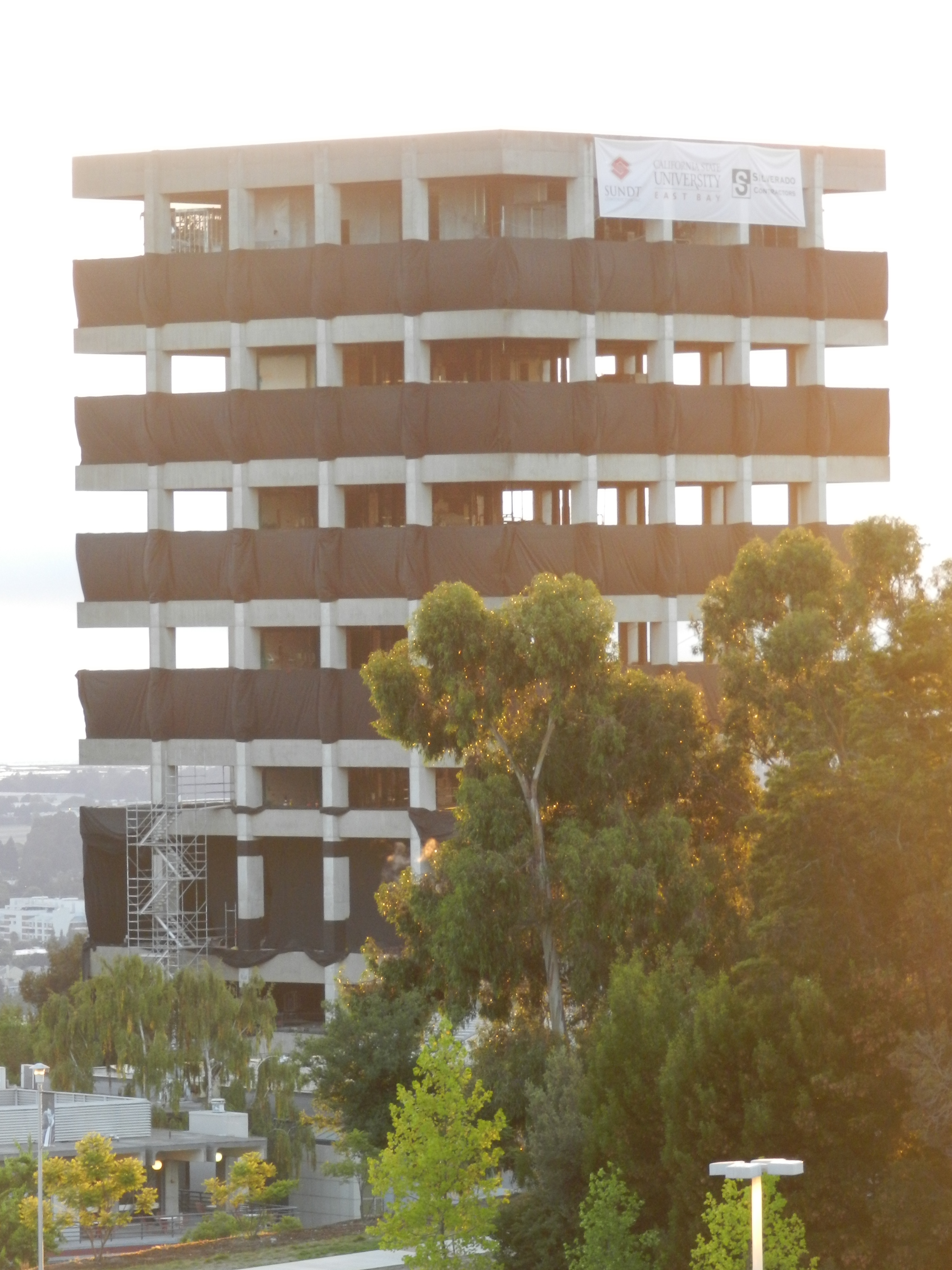
Warren Hall, days prior to demolition

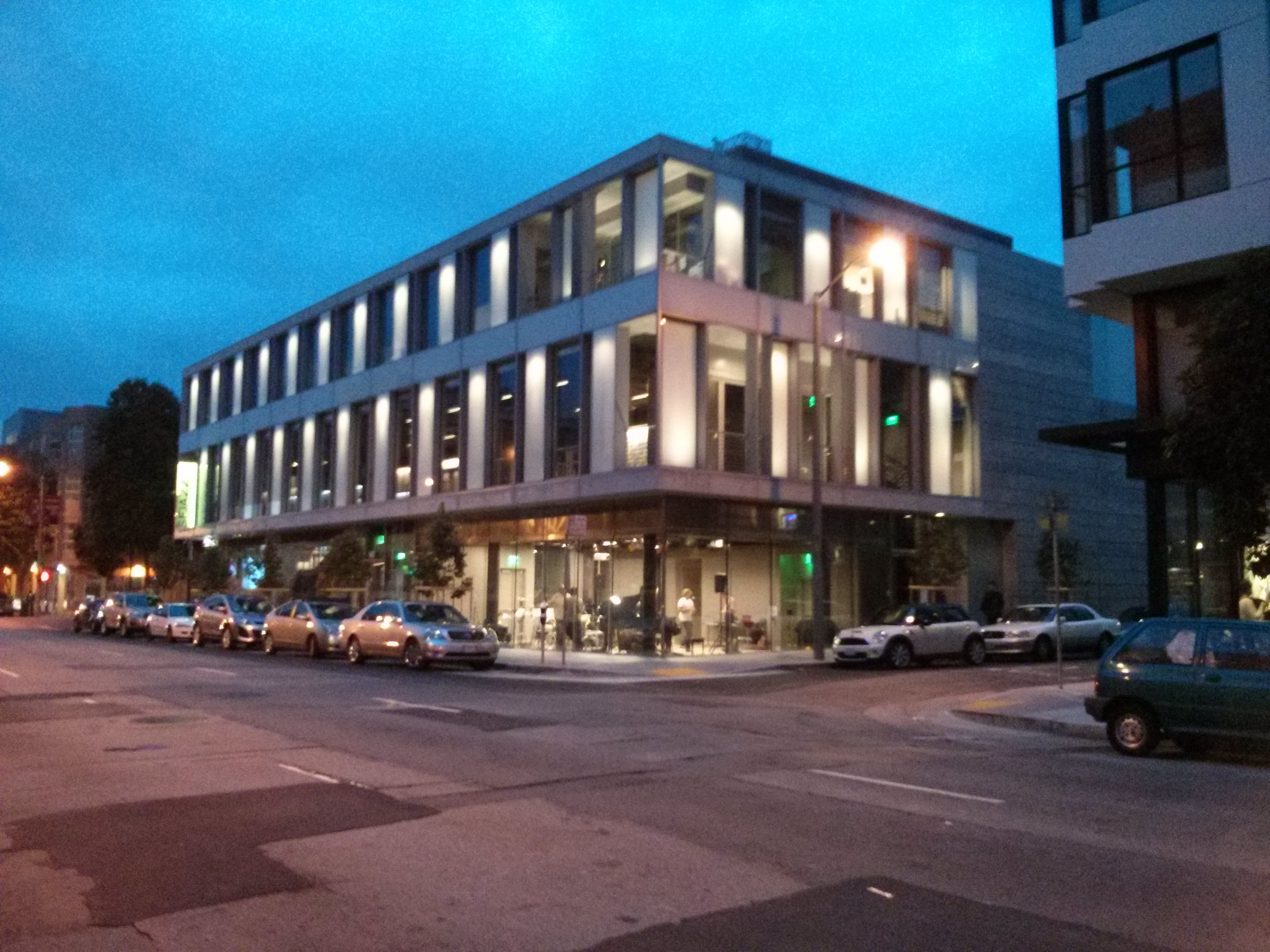
SFJAZZ Center

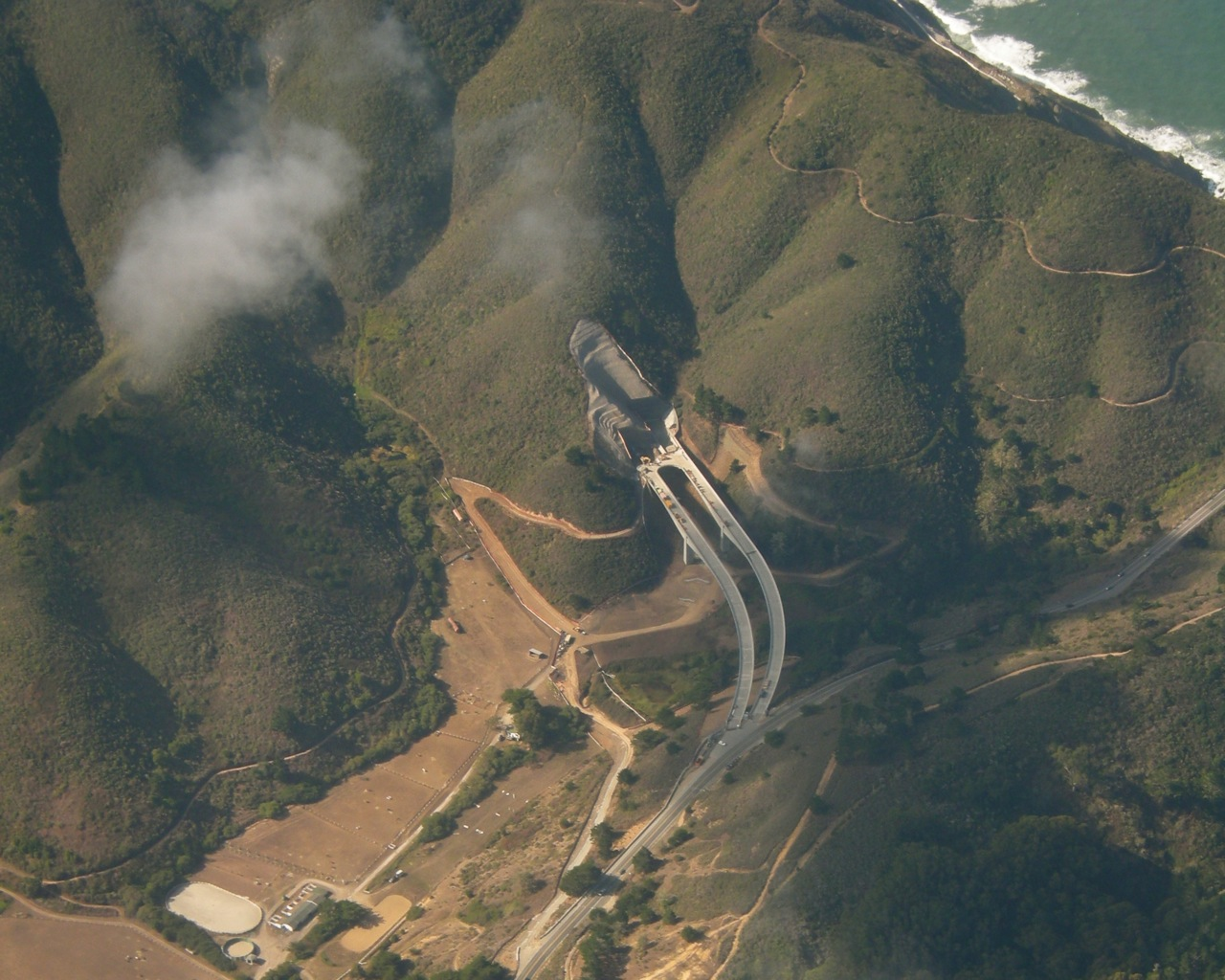
Aerial view of construction of the Tom Lantos Tunnels

• The 2013 America's Cup (Oracle Team USA yacht pictured) is held in San Francisco Bay
• Asiana Airlines Flight 214 crashes while landing at San Francisco International Airport
• An unofficial death certificate is issued for Jahi McMath by the Alameda County coroner
• Andy Lopez is shot and killed by a Sonoma County sheriff's deputy
• Warren Hall (pictured), at California State University, East Bay, is demolished by implosion
• Graton Resort & Casino opens in Rohnert Park
• The Russell City Energy Center goes online in Hayward
• SFJAZZ Center (pictured) opens in San Francisco
• The new eastern span of the San Francisco-Oakland Bay Bridge opens
• Ordinaire, a wine bar and shop serving natural wine, opens in Oakland • Solar Impulse begins a cross-US flight, taking off from Moffett Field in Mountain View
• The Tom Lantos Tunnels (pictured), at Devil's Slide near Pacifica, open
• Gilead Sciences' drug Sovaldi, for the treatment of hepatitis C, is approved by the FDA
• Lawrence Berkeley National Laboratory physicist Carl Haber is awarded a MacArthur "Genius Grant"
• San Francisco Bay is designated a Ramsar Wetland of International Importance
• Cancer patient Miles Scott becomes Batkid for a day in San Francisco, turning it into Gotham City, with Mayor Ed Lee and others participating in the Make-A-Wish project

2014

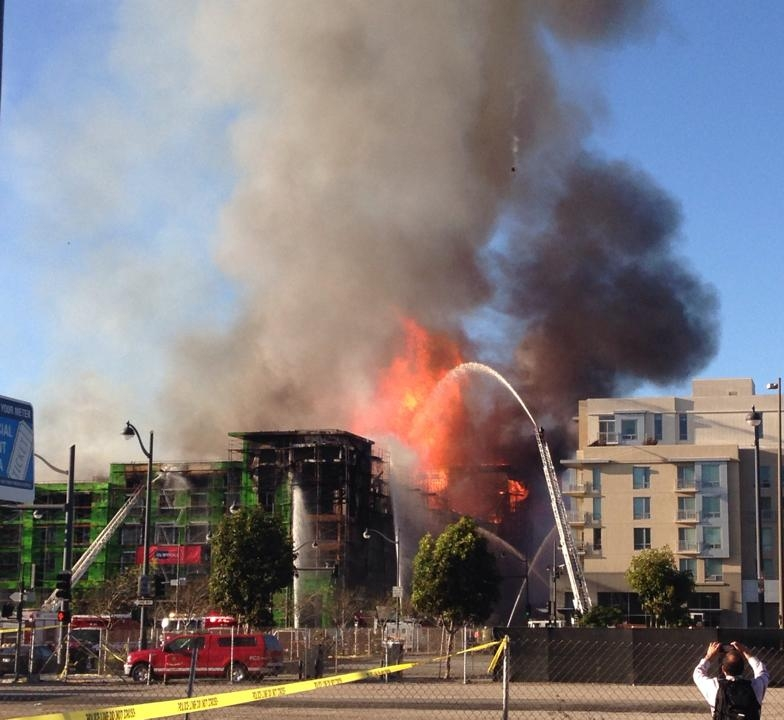
Mission Bay fire

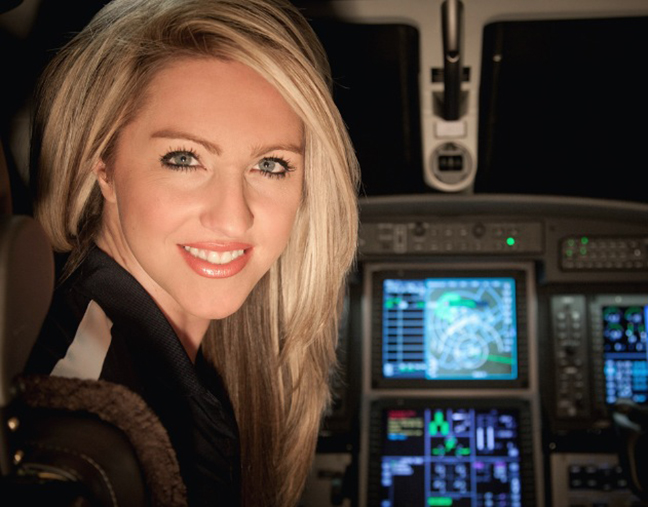
Amelia Rose Earhart

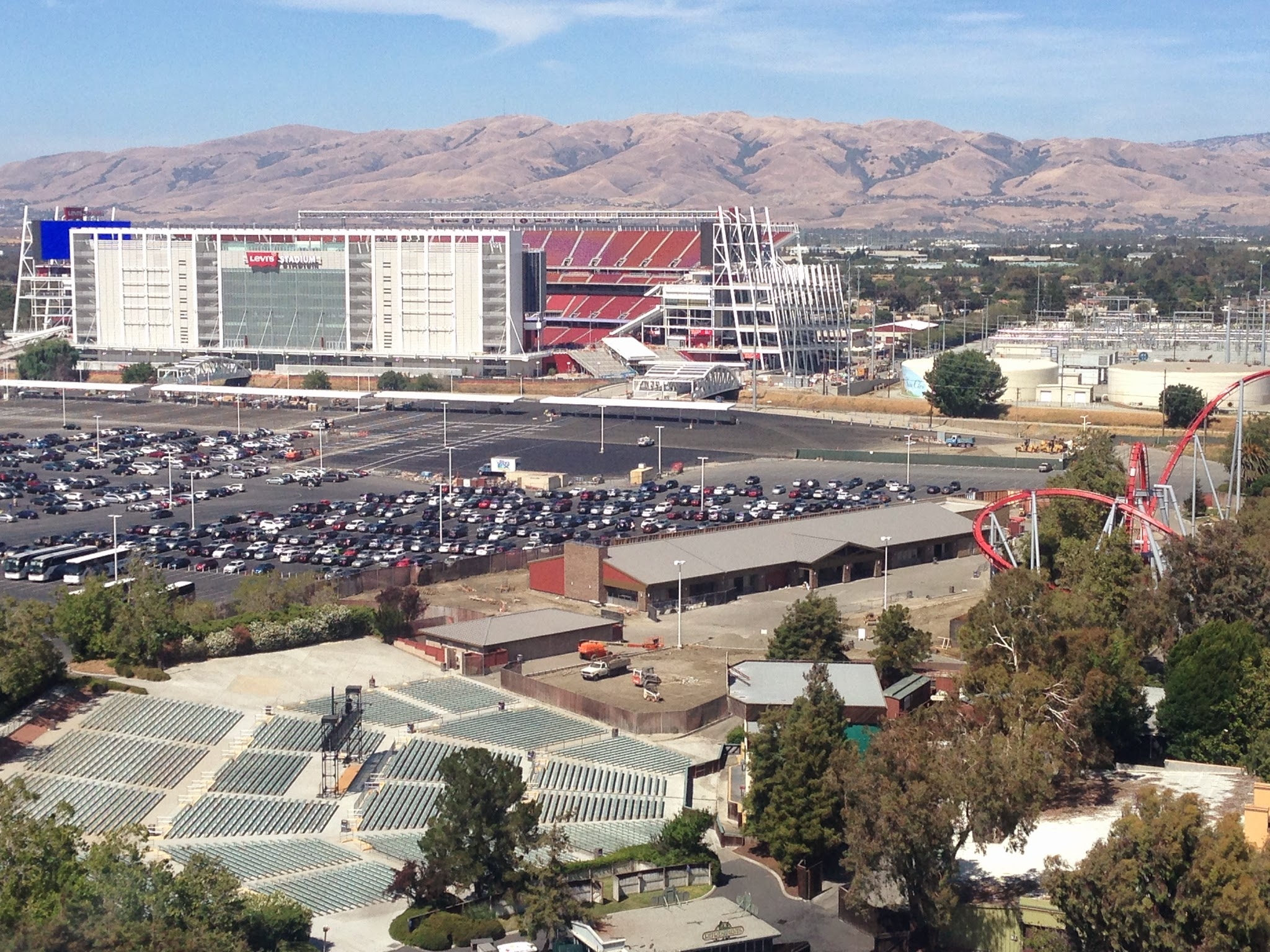
Levi's Stadium, from Great America

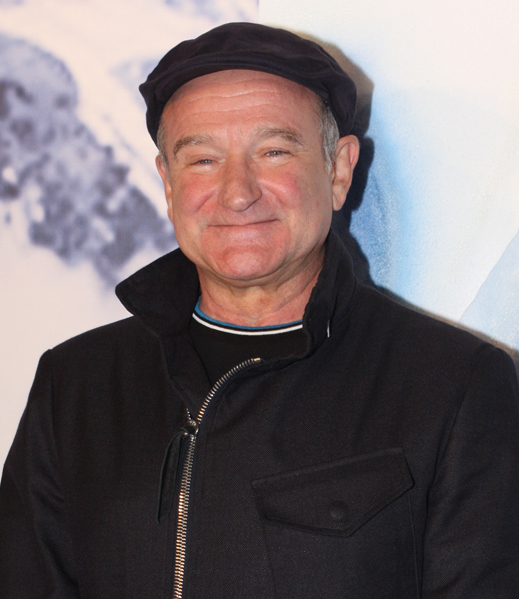
Robin Williams

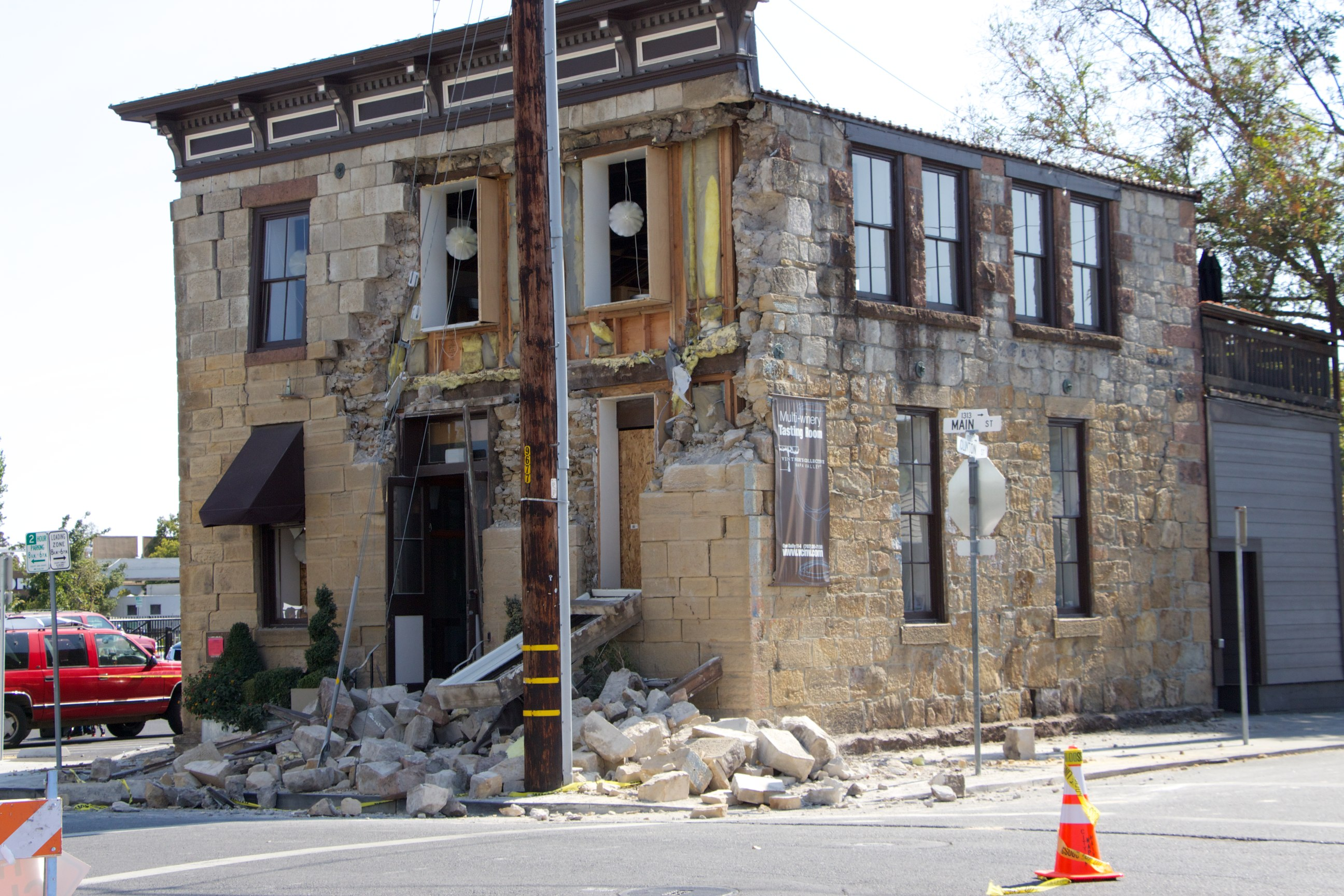
Damage from earthquake

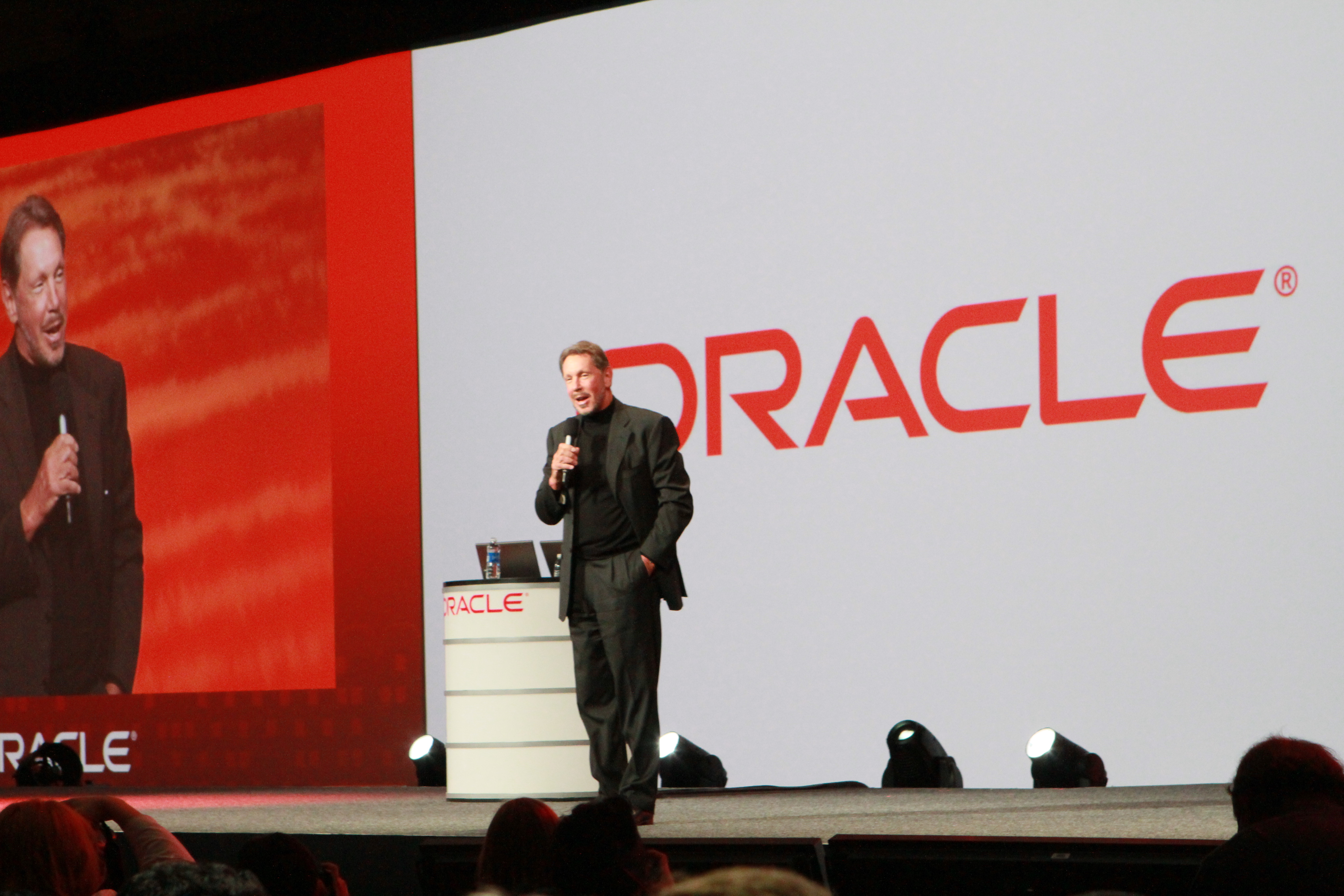
Ellison at Oracle OpenWorld 2010

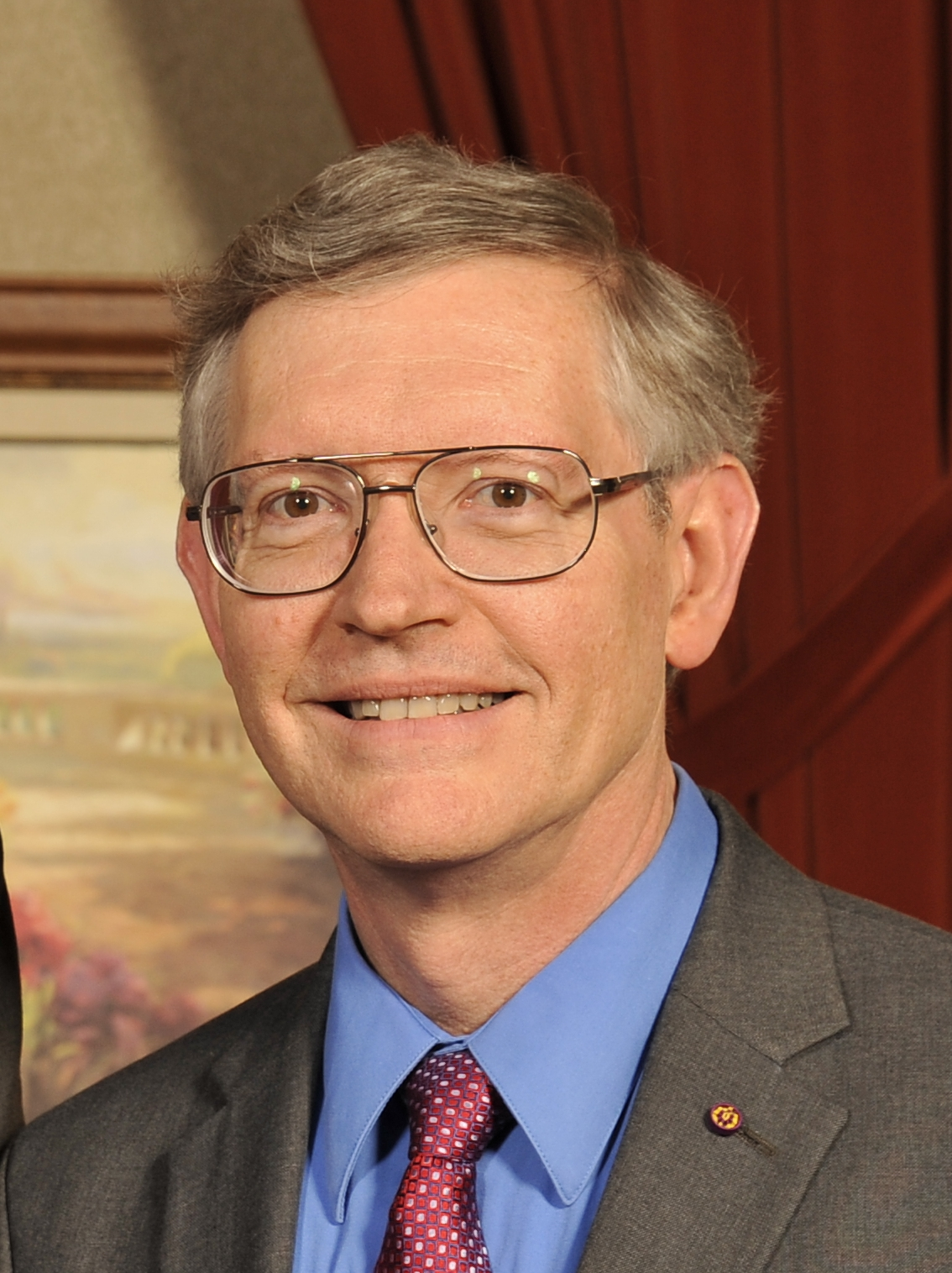
William E. Moerner

SFBG logo

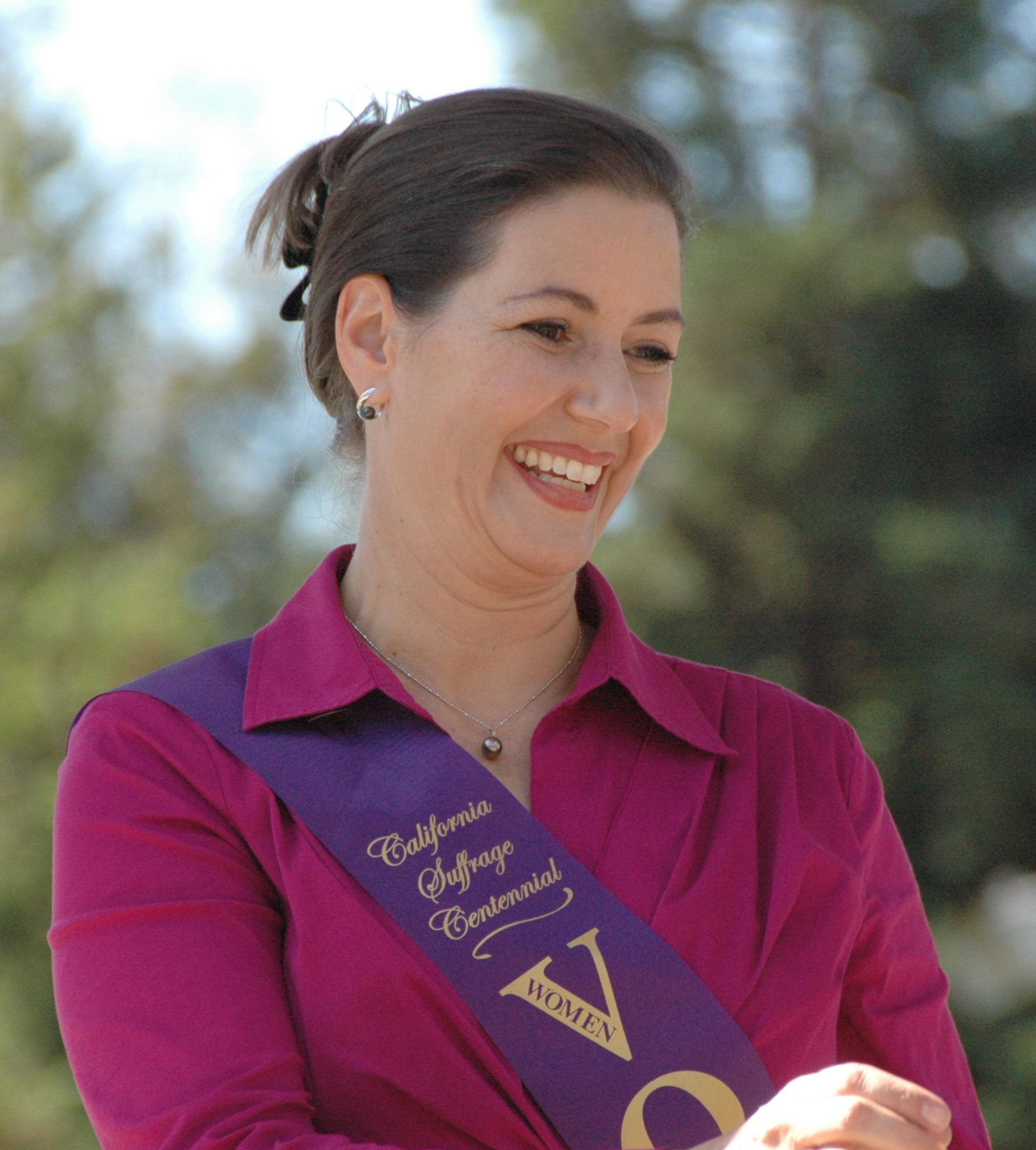
Libby Schaaf

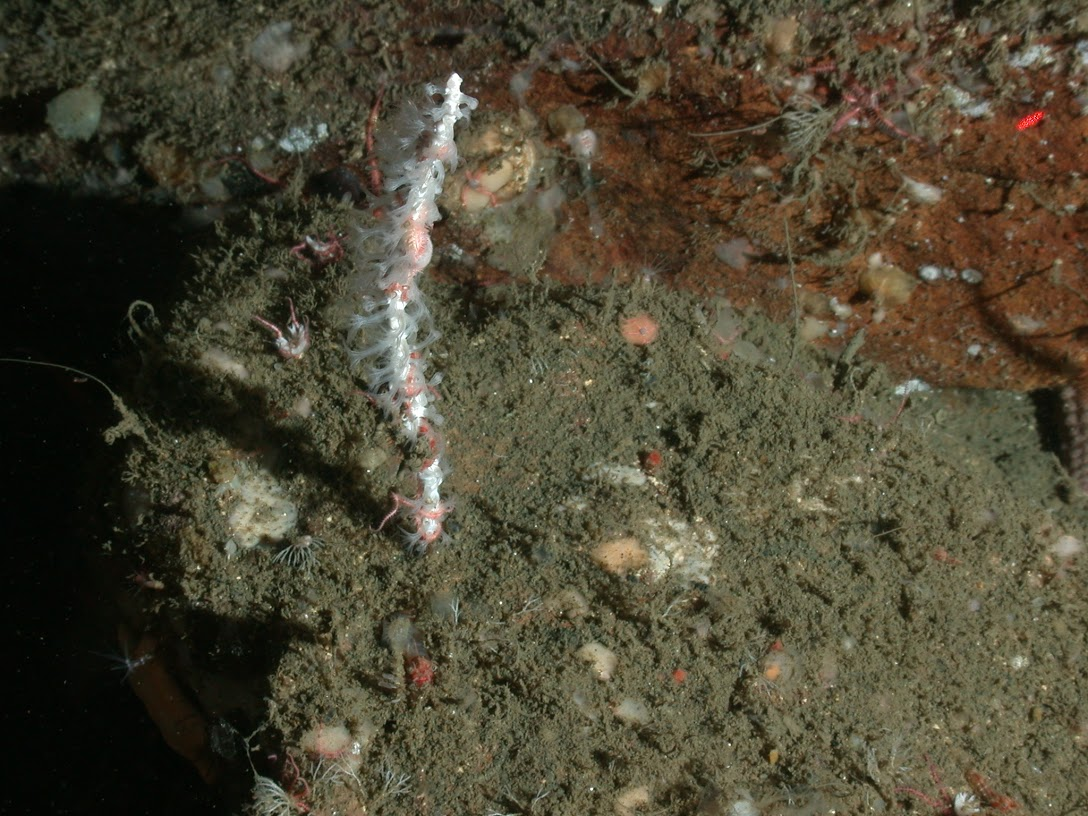
New Leptogorgia species

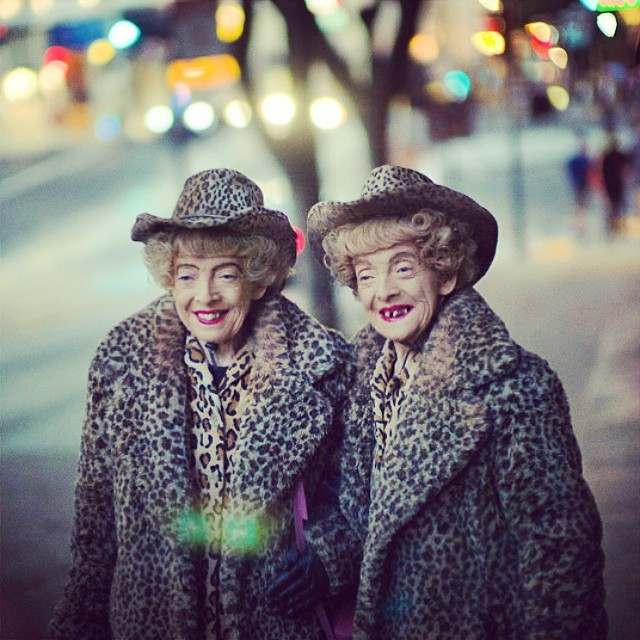
The San Francisco Twins

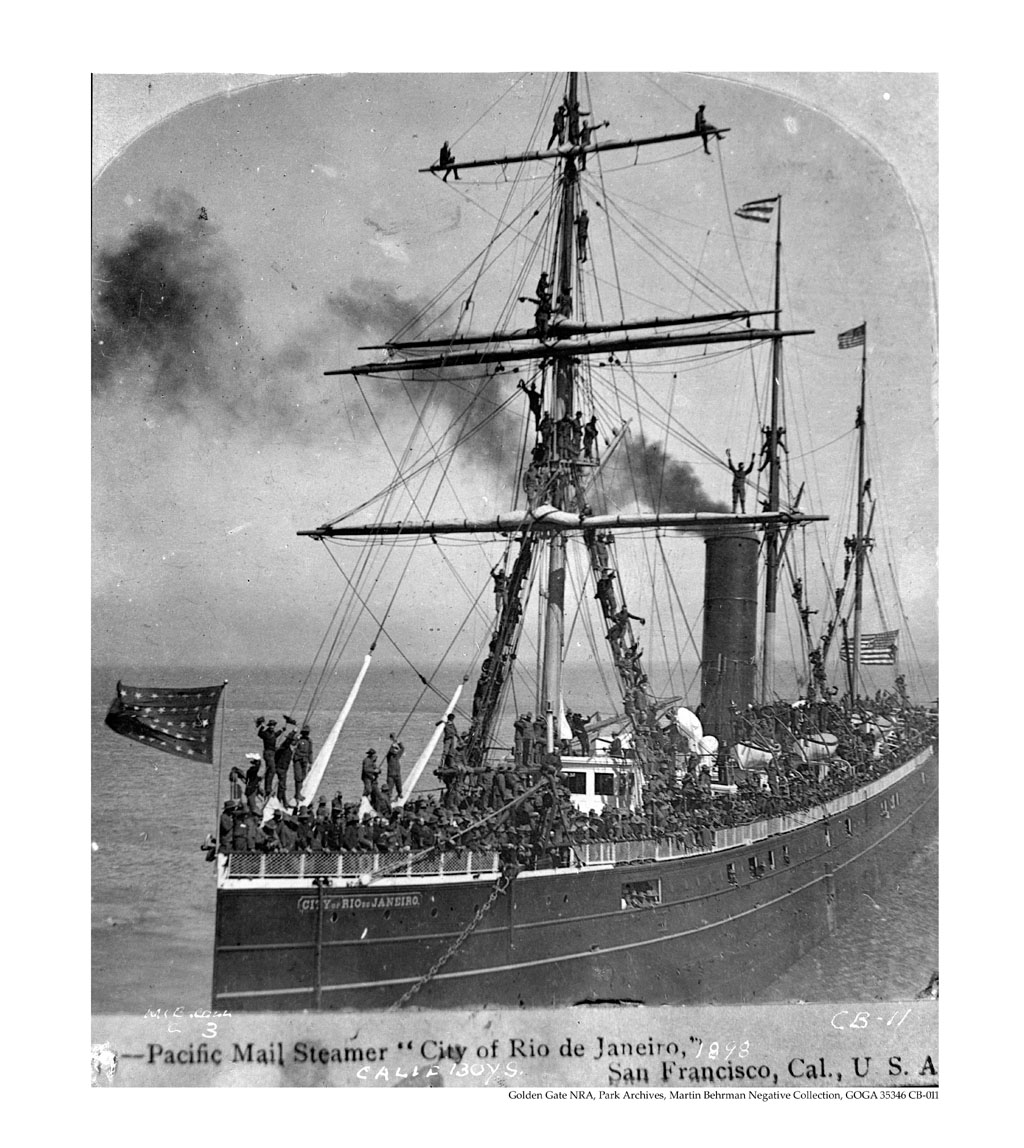
SS City of Rio de Janeiro

A time-lapse animation from NASA's Geostationary Operational Environmental Satellite showing the formation of the storm from December 1–3, 2014 (the small system to the far left of the main storm over California).

- March
  - Democratic California State Senator Leland Yee is arrested by the FBI on charges related to public corruption and gun trafficking
- June
  - A new Kaiser Permanente Medical Center opens in San Leandro
  - Barbara Halliday is elected mayor of Hayward
  - San Francisco political consultant Ryan Chamberlain is apprehended by the FBI and the San Francisco Police Department after explosive materials are allegedly discovered in his apartment
  - Amelia Rose Earhart (pictured) departs from Oakland on June 26, and lands back in Oakland on July 1, successfully recreating her namesake Amelia Earhart's unsuccessful 1937 circumnavigation of the Earth
  - The San Jose Repertory Theatre ceases operations and files for Chapter 7 bankruptcy
- July
  - Levi's Stadium (pictured) opens in Santa Clara as the new home of the San Francisco 49ers of the National Football League
- August
  - Actor and comedian Robin Williams (pictured) dies from an apparent suicide at his home outside Tiburon
  - Maryam Mirzakhani of Stanford University becomes the first woman to be awarded the Fields Medal in mathematics
  - The East Bay Municipal Utility District and the San Francisco Public Utilities Commission impose mandatory water rationing measures, as a consequence of the ongoing drought in California
  - Paul McCartney plays a concert at Candlestick Park, the last event to be held at the venue, and 50 years after The Beatles performed their last concert there
  - Two owners and two staff of the now defunct Rancho Feeding Corporation in Petaluma are indicted on federal charges of violating the 1906 Federal Meat Inspection Act
  - A magnitude 6.0 earthquake strikes in Napa County (damage pictured), with an epicenter 3.7 miles (6.0 km) northwest of the city of American Canyon, the largest earthquake to hit the San Francisco Bay Area since the 1989 Loma Prieta earthquake, sending at least 172 people to the hospital
- September
  - The Berkeley city council passes an ordinance to provide free medical marijuana for low-income patients
  - Apple Inc. CEO Tim Cook presents the Apple Watch (pictured), the iPhone 6 and the iPhone 6 Plus at the Flint Performing Arts Center in Cupertino
  - Stanford University social psychologist Jennifer Eberhardt is awarded a Macarthur "Genius Grant" Fellowship
  - Larry Ellison (pictured) steps down as CEO of Oracle Corporation, to become chief technical officer, and executive chairman of the board of directors
- October
  - Hewlett-Packard CEO Meg Whitman announces plans for the company to split in two, forming Hewlett-Packard Enterprise and HP, Inc.
  - Stanford University professor William E. Moerner (pictured), Eric Betzig and Stefan Hell are awarded the Nobel Prize in Chemistry for their use of fluorescence in microscopy
  - Livermore golf coach Andrew Nisbet is sentenced to 27 years in prison on charges of molesting three of his juvenile students, and then plotting to kill them while being held in jail
  - The Daughters of Charity Health System approves the sale of Daly City's Seton Medical Center and San Jose's O'Connor Hospital to Prime Healthcare Services
  - The San Francisco Bay Guardian free weekly alternative newspaper ceases publication after 48 years (logo pictured)
  - The San Francisco Giants defeat the Kansas City Royals to win the World Series, their third championship in five seasons
  - Ross William Ulbricht is arrested in San Francisco, charged with running the Silk Road dark web online illicit marketplace
  - Apple, Inc. CEO Tim Cook states in an editorial that he is "proud to be gay", becoming the first openly gay leader of a major U.S. company
  - University of California, Berkeley Chancellor Nicholas Dirks announces plans for a Berkeley Global Campus at Richmond Bay, to develop existing UC campuses in Richmond
  - Susan Xiao-Ping Su, founder and former president of the defunct Pleasanton-based Tri-Valley University, is sentenced to 16 years in prison for visa and mail fraud
- November
  - Libby Schaaf (pictured) is elected mayor of Oakland, defeating incumbent mayor Jean Quan
  - Measure D, a sugary drink tax, is approved by Berkeley voters, the first such tax in the United States
  - Mike Honda is elected to California's 17th congressional district, defeating Ro Khanna
  - David Chiu is elected to California's 17th State Assembly district, defeating David Campos
  - Sam Liccardo is elected mayor of San Jose, defeating Dave Cortese
  - A new, unnamed species (pictured) in the coral genus Leptogorgia is discovered off the coast of Sonoma County, near the Gulf of the Farallones and Cordell Bank National Marine Sanctuaries
  - Up to 18,000 nurses from at least 21 Kaiser Permanente hospitals and 35 clinics around the Bay Area go on strike, citing issues with patient care standards and Ebola safeguards
  - The 27 story 535 Mission Street office skyscraper opens in the South of Market district of San Francisco
  - Marian Brown of the San Francisco Twins, dies, her sister Vivian having died in January 2013 (sisters pictured)
  - The Oakland Airport Connector automated guideway transit (AGT) system begins operating between the BART Coliseum station and Oakland International Airport station
  - The Watershed Alliance of Marin reports that no coho salmon had returned to Redwood Creek in 2014, prompting concerns of likely local extinction of the species.
  - The remains of the SS City of Rio de Janeiro (pictured), which shipwrecked in 1901, are found off the shores of San Francisco at the Golden Gate
- December
  - Protesters of the grand jury decision in the death of New Yorker Eric Garner take to the streets in Berkeley, Oakland and San Francisco
  - A large storm (video shown) leaves 150,000 households without power across the Bay Area
  - San Jose demolishes The Jungle, the nation's largest homeless person encampment
  - Google unveils a fully functioning prototype of the Google driverless car, with plans to test it on Bay Area roads beginning in 2015

2015

23andMe logo

Golden Gate Bridge median

Ford Research and Innovation logo

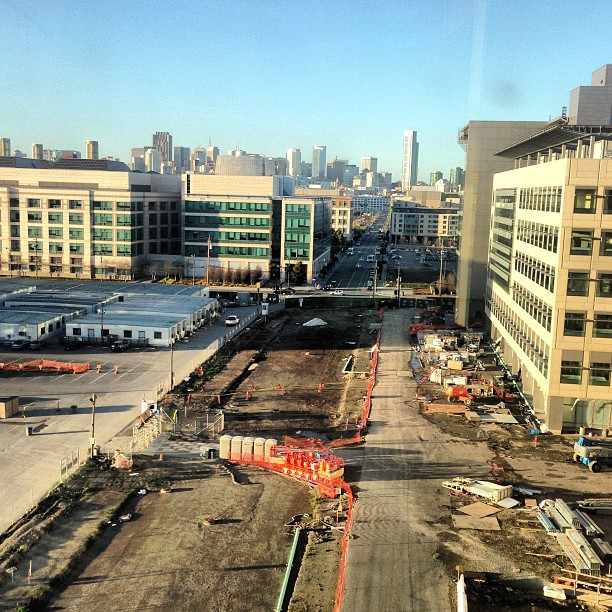
UCSF Mission Bay construction

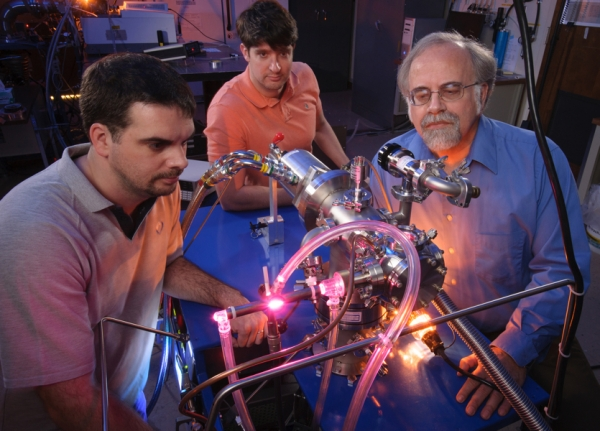
Left to right: Ames scientists Michel Nuevo, Christopher Materese and Scott Sandford reproduce uracil, cytosine, and thymine, three key components of our hereditary material, in the laboratory

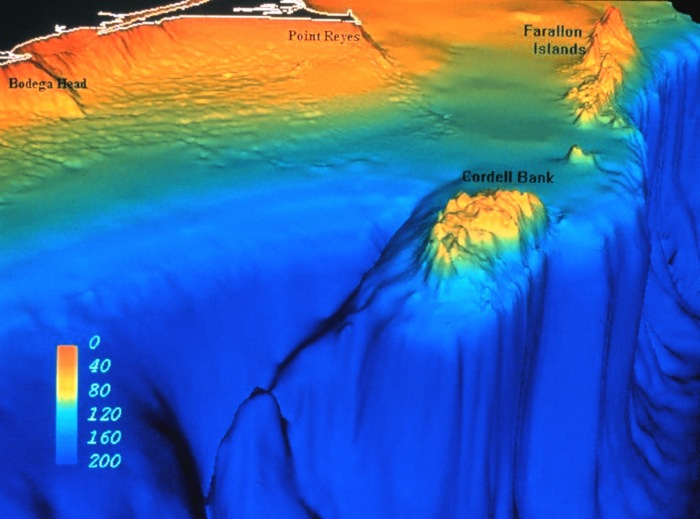
Cordell Bank and Farallones topography

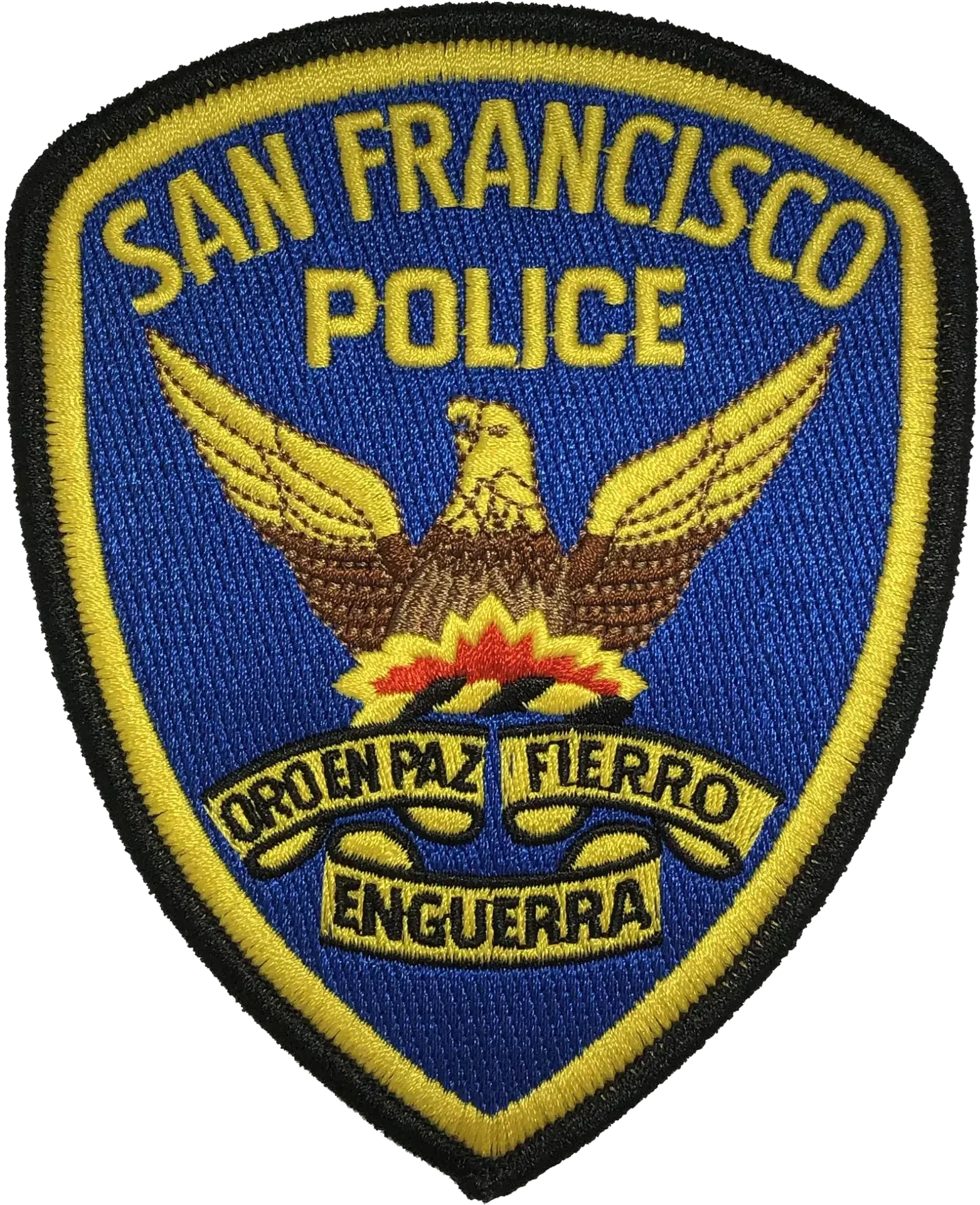
SFPD insignia

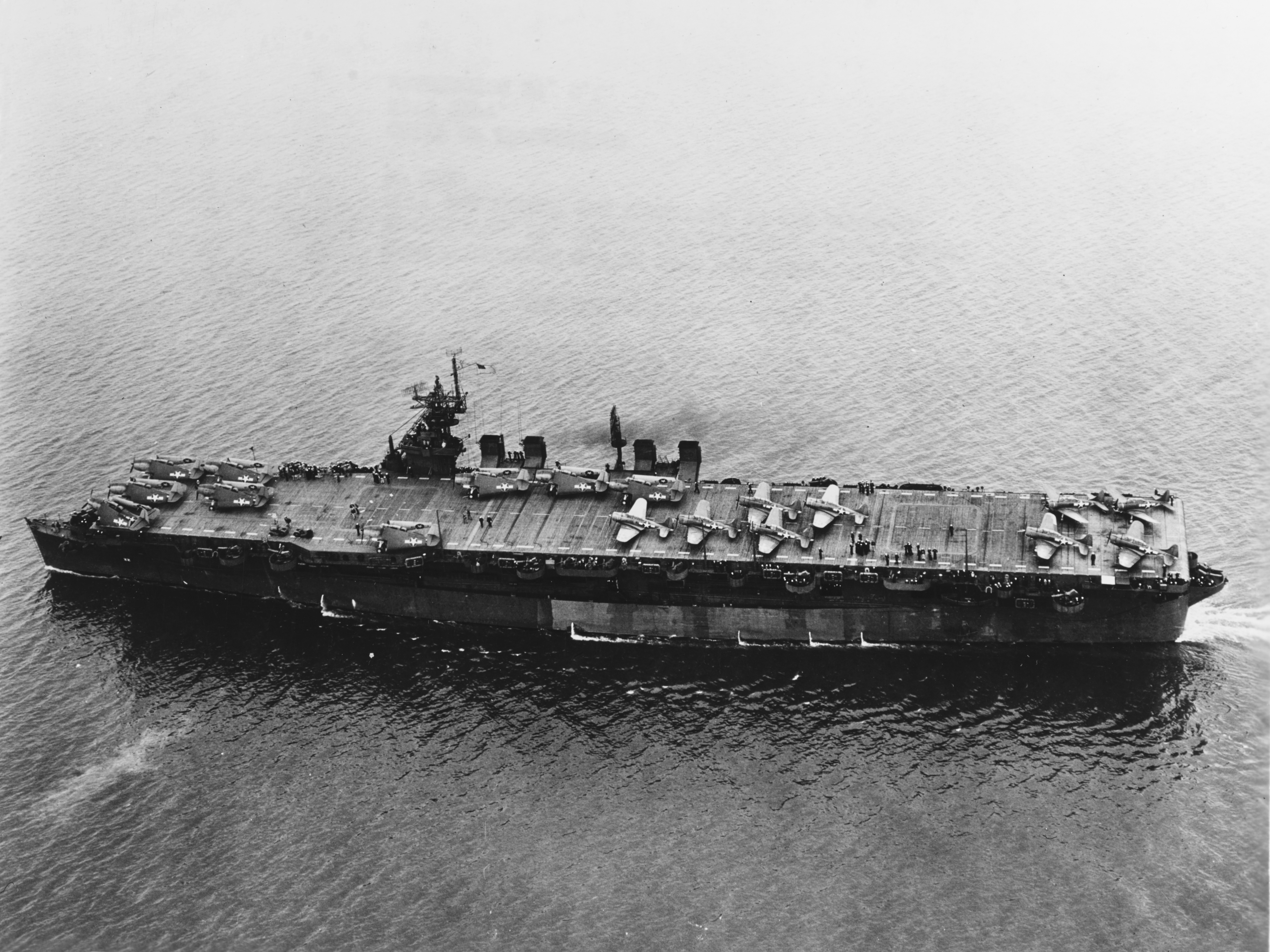
USS Independence in the San Francisco Bay

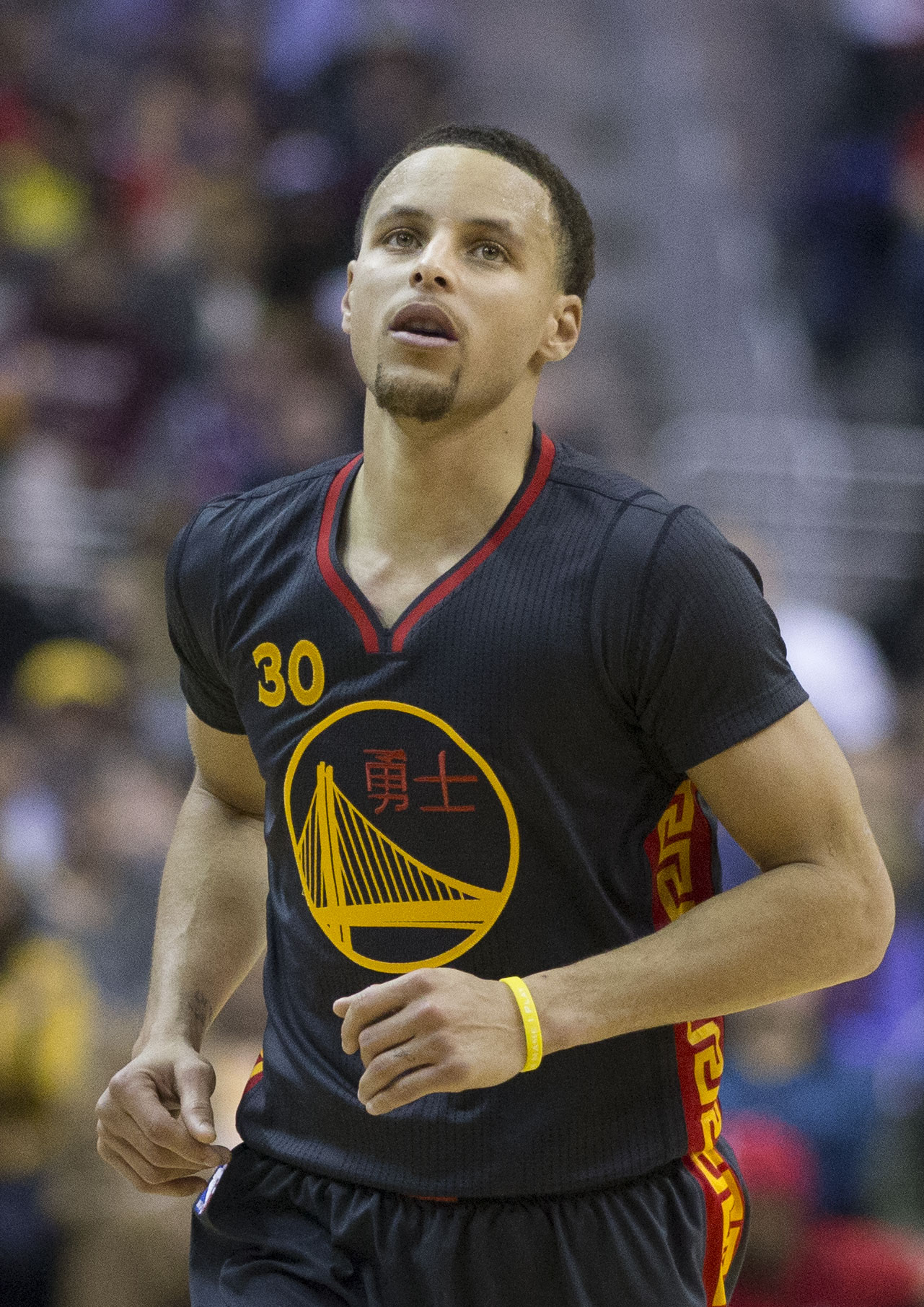
Stephen Curry in 2015

Next Thing Co. logo

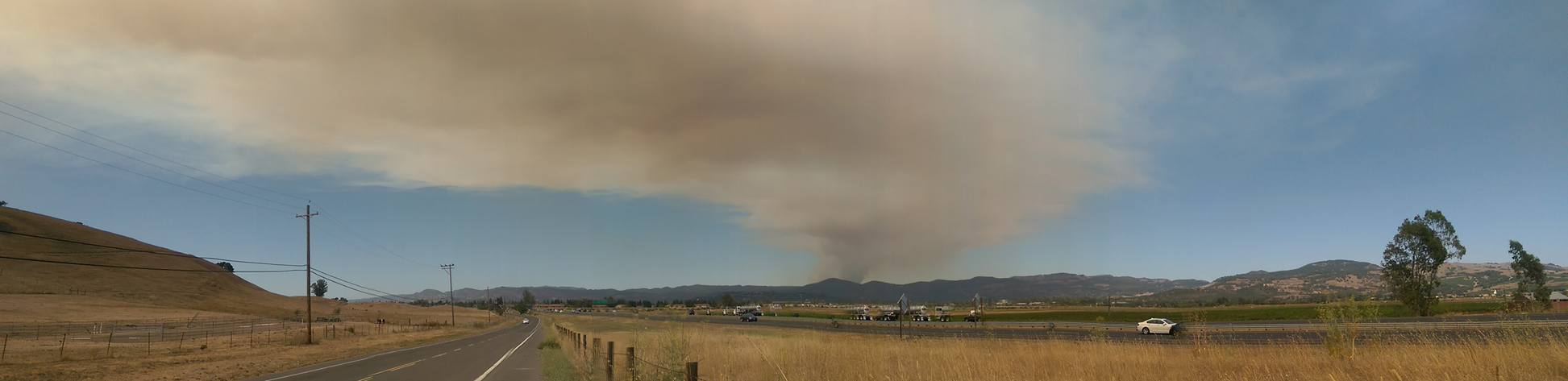
Wragg Fire

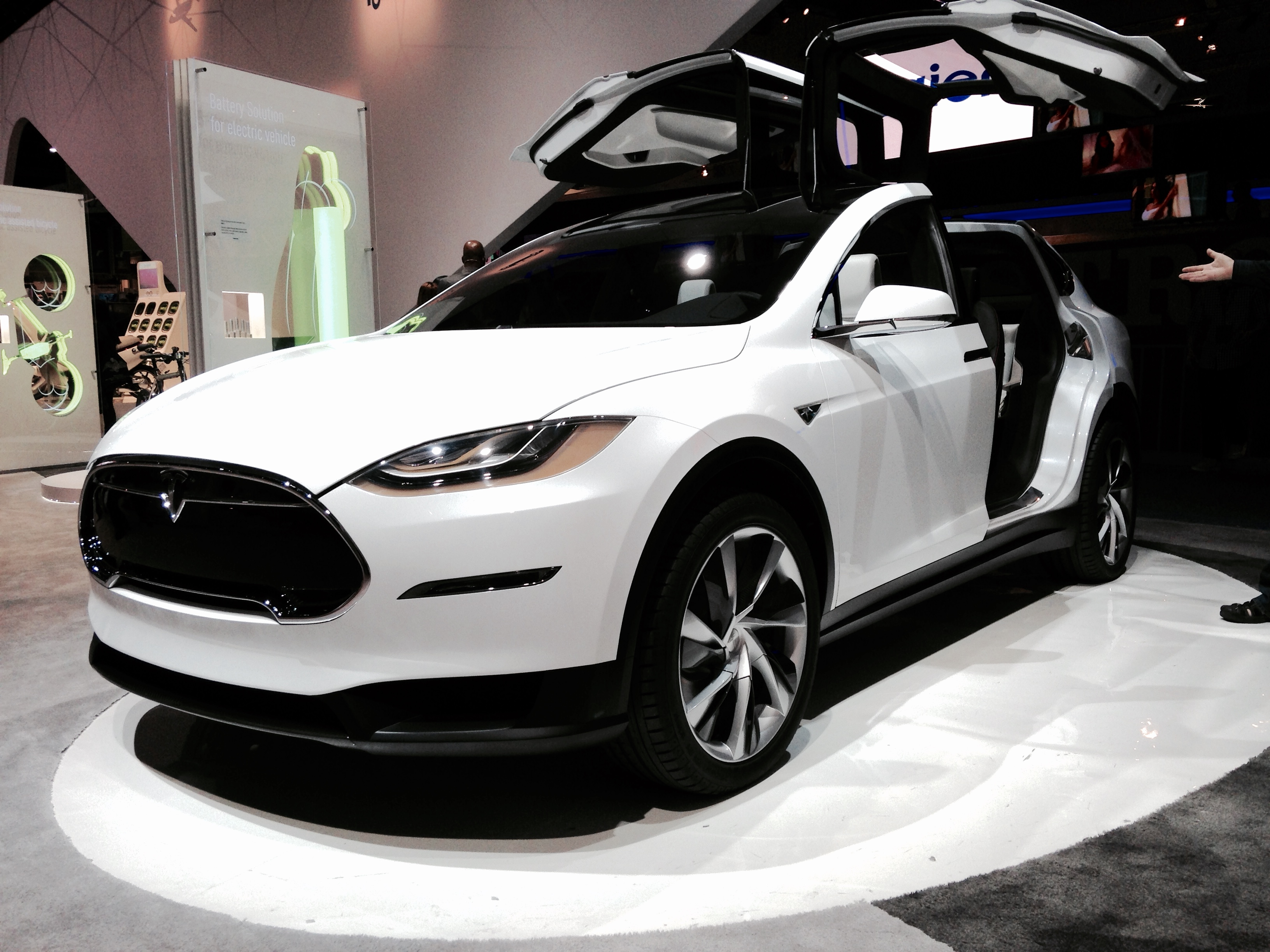
Tesla Model X

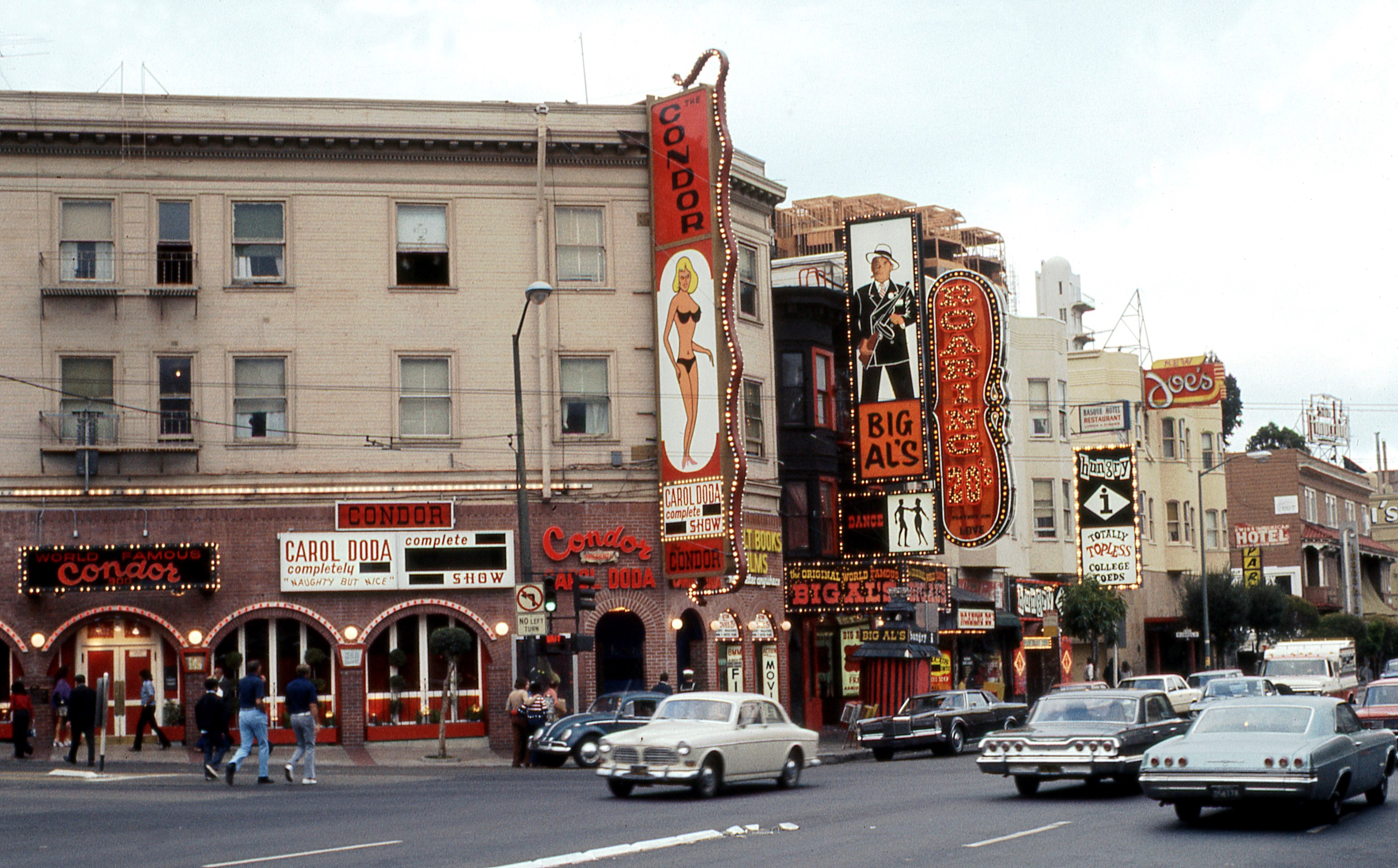
Condor Club

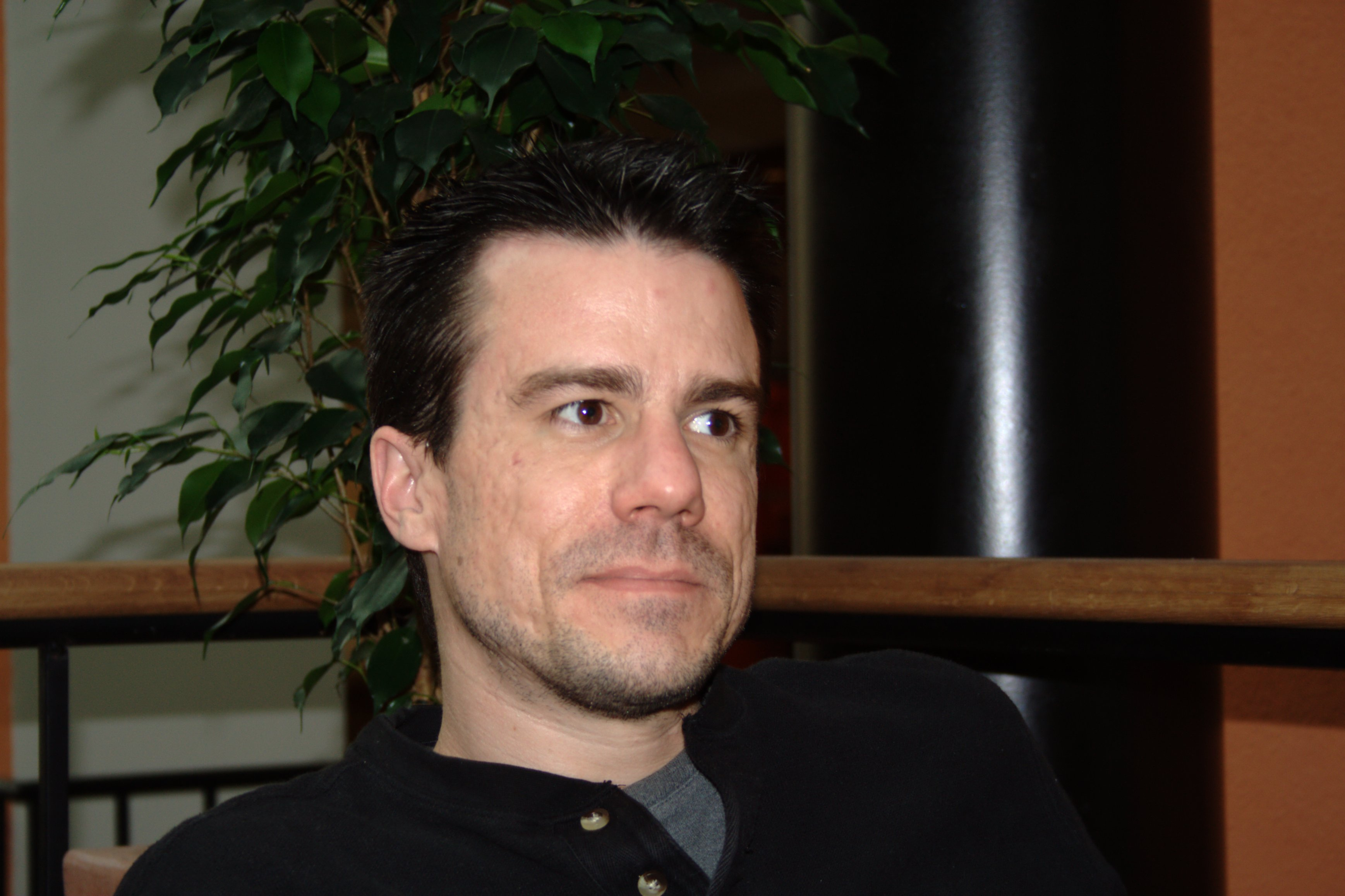
Ian Murdock (2008)

- January
  - Personal genomics and biotechnology company 23andMe announces a $60 million investment by Genentech for Parkinson's research
  - The Golden Gate Bridge closes to automobile traffic for the first time in its history, in order to install a mobile concrete median (pictured)
  - Birds coated with an unidentified sticky grey substance are found along the eastern shore of San Francisco Bay, and are sent to International Bird Rescue in Fairfield for cleanup efforts
  - Ford Motor Company announces the creation of the Ford Research and Innovation Center, located in Palo Alto (logo pictured)
  - The Tesoro refinery in Martinez closes due to a strike affecting nine refineries in the US
- February
  - The National Weather Service announces that due to the ongoing California drought, San Francisco received no January rainfall for the first time in 165 years. The Bay Area had the driest January on record.
  - The University of California, San Francisco Medical Center opens a new hospital in the Mission Bay district of San Francisco (construction pictured)
  - President Barack Obama attends the White House Cybersecurity Summit at Stanford University
  - San Francisco resident Christie White, battling cancer, sues the state of California for the right to die at home, by physician assisted suicide
  - Shipowners at the Port of Oakland suspend the unloading of container and other cargo ships, due to a slowdown during contract negotiations with the International Longshore and Warehouse Union
  - The UCSF Medical Center receives a philanthropic donation of $100 million from Chuck Feeney, the largest gift by an individual in the history of the UC system.
  - Avaya Stadium, the new home of the San Jose Earthquakes soccer team, stages its first Earthquakes soccer game
- March
  - Scientists (pictured) at the Ames Research Center announce they have synthesized "...uracil, cytosine, and thymine, all three components of RNA and DNA, non-biologically in a laboratory under conditions found in space."
  - Patrick Willis, linebacker for eight years with the San Francisco 49ers, retires at age 30 due to a foot injury
  - Prime Healthcare Services rejects an offer to purchase Daly City's Seton Medical Center and San Jose's O'Connor Hospital from the Daughters of Charity Health System
  - The U.S. Geological Survey report, "Third Uniform California Earthquake Rupture Forecast", estimates there is a 72 percent chance that a magnitude-6.7 or larger quake will strike the Bay Area before the year 2044
  - Professor Ronald Rael, of the College of Environmental Design at UC Berkeley unveils a 9' high 3D printed architectural experiment, entitled "Bloom", the first printed structure of its type.
  - The National Oceanic and Atmospheric Administration more than doubles the size of the Cordell Bank and Gulf of the Farallones Marine Sanctuaries (underwater topography pictured)
  - The San Francisco Police Department relocates its headquarters from the Hall of Justice to a new facility at Mission Bay (insignia pictured)
  - Lawyer and Reddit executive Ellen Pao loses in a gender discrimination lawsuit against Silicon Valley venture capital firm Kleiner Perkins Caufield & Byers
- April
  - The Brookings Institution reports that San Francisco has the wealthiest people, in the top 5% of its population, of any major U.S. city, and the fastest growing income inequality S.F.'s richest are wealthiest in the land
  - Governor Jerry Brown imposes mandatory water rationing for the first time in state history, requiring all local water supply agencies, including the Alameda County, Marin, Sonoma and Santa Clara Valley Water Districts, reduce water use by 25%, due to the ongoing drought in California
  - Author and community activist Eddy Zheng is pardoned by governor Brown, for crimes he committed at age 16
  - Apple, Inc. introduces the Apple Watch (pictured)
  - Over 100 prominent Bay Area Catholics sign a full page advertisement in the San Francisco Chronicle appealing to Pope Francis to replace Salvatore Cordileone as archbishop of the San Francisco Archdiocese, for fostering "an atmosphere of division and intolerance."
  - The World War II era aircraft carrier USS Independence (pictured) is rediscovered near the Farallon Islands by the National Oceanic and Atmospheric Administration
  - Doctors Medical Center in San Pablo closes
  - The San Francisco-based Heald College system shuts down, when its parent company, Corinthian Colleges, goes out of business
  - Tesla Motors announces the Powerwall, a battery system for home use
- May
  - Golden State Warriors basketball player Stephen Curry (pictured) is awarded the 2015 NBA Most Valuable Player Award
  - The San Mateo–Hayward Bridge closes to traffic, for the first time since opening in 1967, for resurfacing and maintenance.
  - San Francisco District Attorney George Gascón orders a review of at least 3,000 arrests over the last 10 years, in response to evidence that San Francisco Police Department officers may have shown racial bias, based on their having sent racist and homophobic text messages
  - San Francisco becomes the first city in the United States to ban chewing tobacco at sports venues, including AT&T Park, the home of the San Francisco Giants
  - The Regional Renewable Energy Procurement Project dedicates its first project, a future solar farm at Hayward's former landfill site
  - Dead gray whales wash ashore at Half Moon Bay, then at Portuguese Beach in Sonoma County, with a sperm whale also washing ashore at Point Reyes National Seashore, the third, fourth and fifth dead whales found on Bay Area beaches (among eight in Northern California) in less than 2 months
  - Oakland based start-up Next Thing Co. raises over $1.5m in its Kickstarter campaign for its forthcoming $9 miniature computer, Chip.
  - The population of San Jose is now officially over 1,000,000, making it the tenth largest city in the United States, according to the U.S. census
  - Vandals damage an inflatable dam across Alameda Creek in Fremont, releasing 50 million gallons of drinking water into San Francisco Bay
  - The Solar Energy Research Center opens at the newly built Chu Hall at Lawrence Berkeley National Laboratory in Berkeley
  - The Golden State Warriors beat the Houston Rockets in the National Basketball Association Playoffs, and advance to the NBA Finals for the first time since 1975
- June
  - Surgeons at University of California, San Francisco and California Pacific Medical Center successfully complete 18 surgeries in the nation's first nine-way, two-day kidney transplant chain in a single city
  - Six people are killed and eight are injured, some with life-threatening injuries, after a balcony collapses in Berkeley, near the campus of the University of California, Berkeley; five of the casualties are Irish students.
  - The Golden State Warriors win the National Basketball Association Finals against the Cleveland Cavaliers, their first championship since 1975
  - The surviving members of the Grateful Dead play the first concerts of their Fare Thee Well farewell tour, celebrating the 50th anniversary of the Dead, at Santa Clara's Levi's Stadium
- July
  - Former state senator Leland Yee pleads guilty to a federal racketeering charge, confessing to using his bids for secretary of state and Mayor of San Francisco to extort bribes
  - A gunman opens fire at Pier 14 in San Francisco's Embarcadero district, killing Kathryn Steinle. An illegal immigrant from Mexico, Francisco Sanchez, is subsequently arrested and charged with murder.
  - The Wragg Fire wildland fire (pictured) starts just off of California State Route 128 near Lake Berryessa in Napa County
- August
  - Alphabet, a holding company and conglomerate owning several companies owned by or sprung from Google, is founded
- September
  - The Valley Fire encroaches into Napa and Sonoma Counties
  - Tesla Motors begins shipping the Model X SUV (pictured) from its Fremont factory
  - UC Berkeley chemistry and materials science professor Peidong Yang is awarded a MacArthur "Genius" grant
  - Filmmaker Alexandra Pelosi releases the documentary San Francisco 2.0, chronicling the recent high tech takeover and gentrification of the City
  - The Golden State Warriors finalize the purchase of 12 acres of land in Mission Bay, San Francisco, to house a future stadium
- November
  - San Jose is the richest city in the United States, according to Bloomberg
  - Topless stripper Carol Doda, an iconic Condor Club performer, dies in San Francisco (Condor Club c. 1973 pictured)
  - Wang Hall, housing the National Energy Research Scientific Computing Center, opens at the Lawrence Berkeley National Laboratory
- December
  - Artificial intelligence laboratory OpenAI is founded in San Francisco
  - Linux software pioneer and Debian founder Ian Murdock (pictured) dies in San Francisco at age 42
  - CMA CGM Benjamin Franklin, the largest container ship to visit a US port, comes to the Port of Oakland

2016

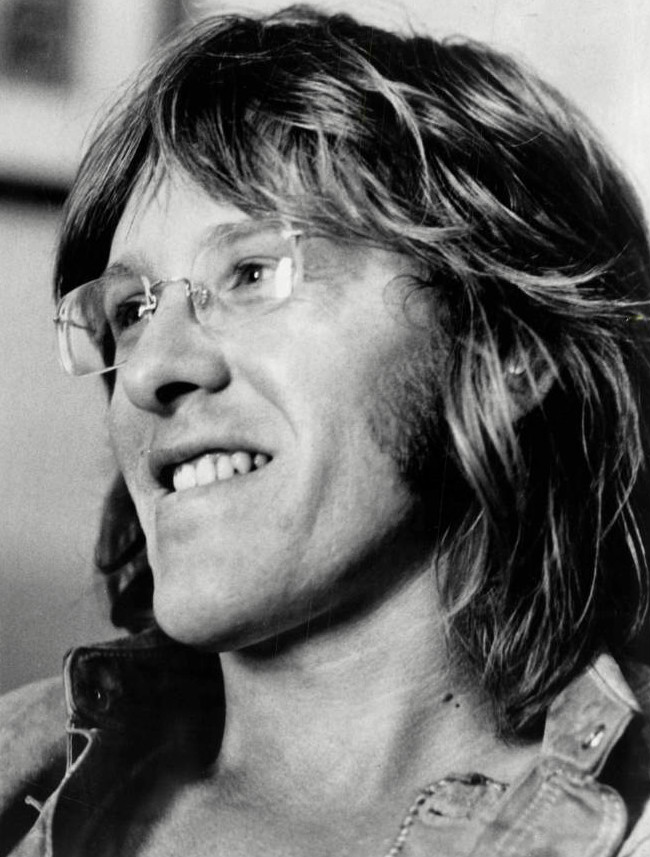
Paul Kantner (1975)

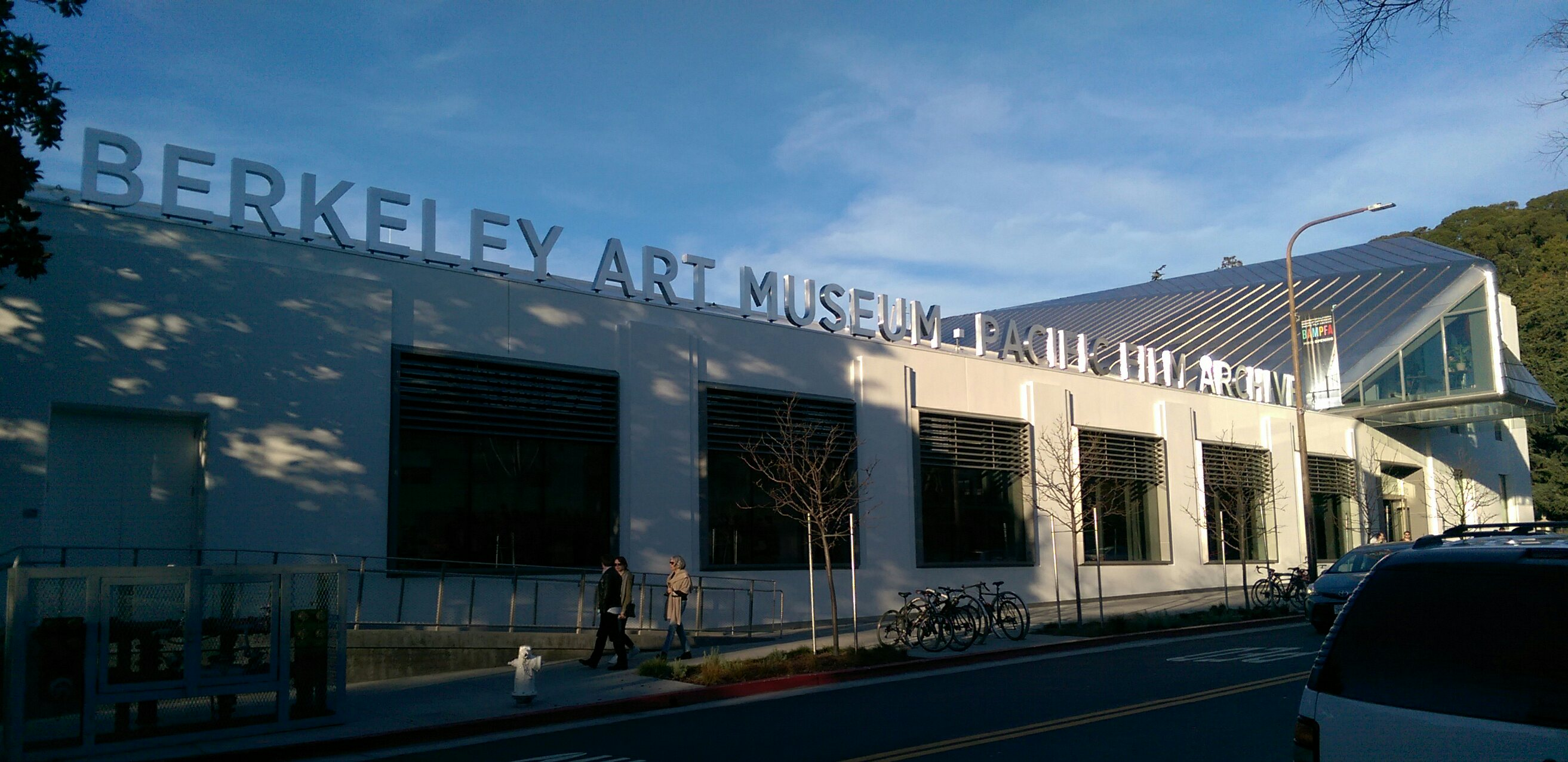
The Berkeley Art Museum

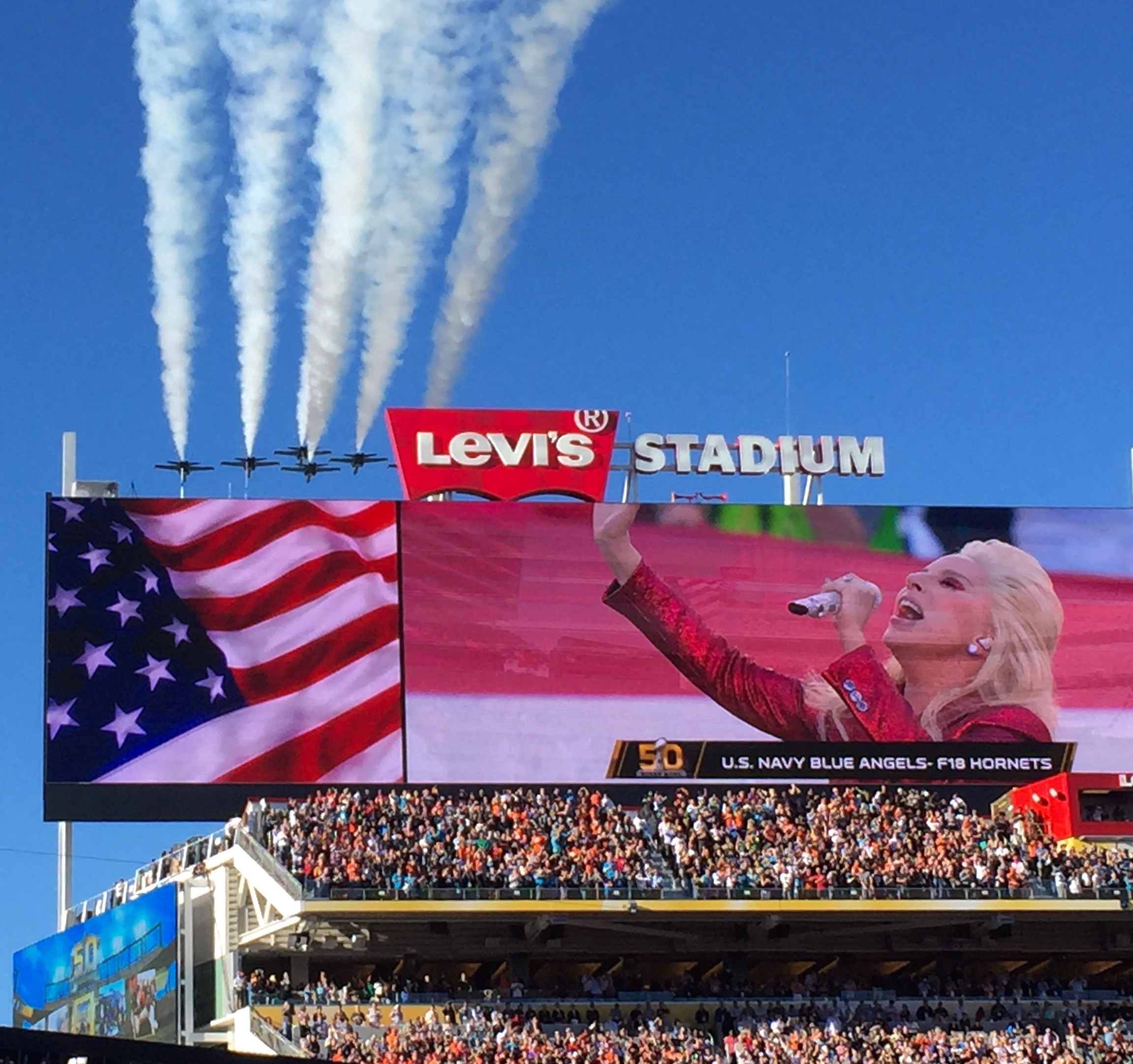
Lady Gaga and the Blue Angels at Super Bowl 50

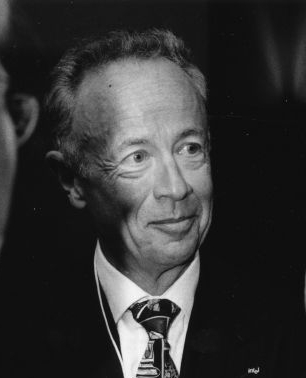
Andrew Grove

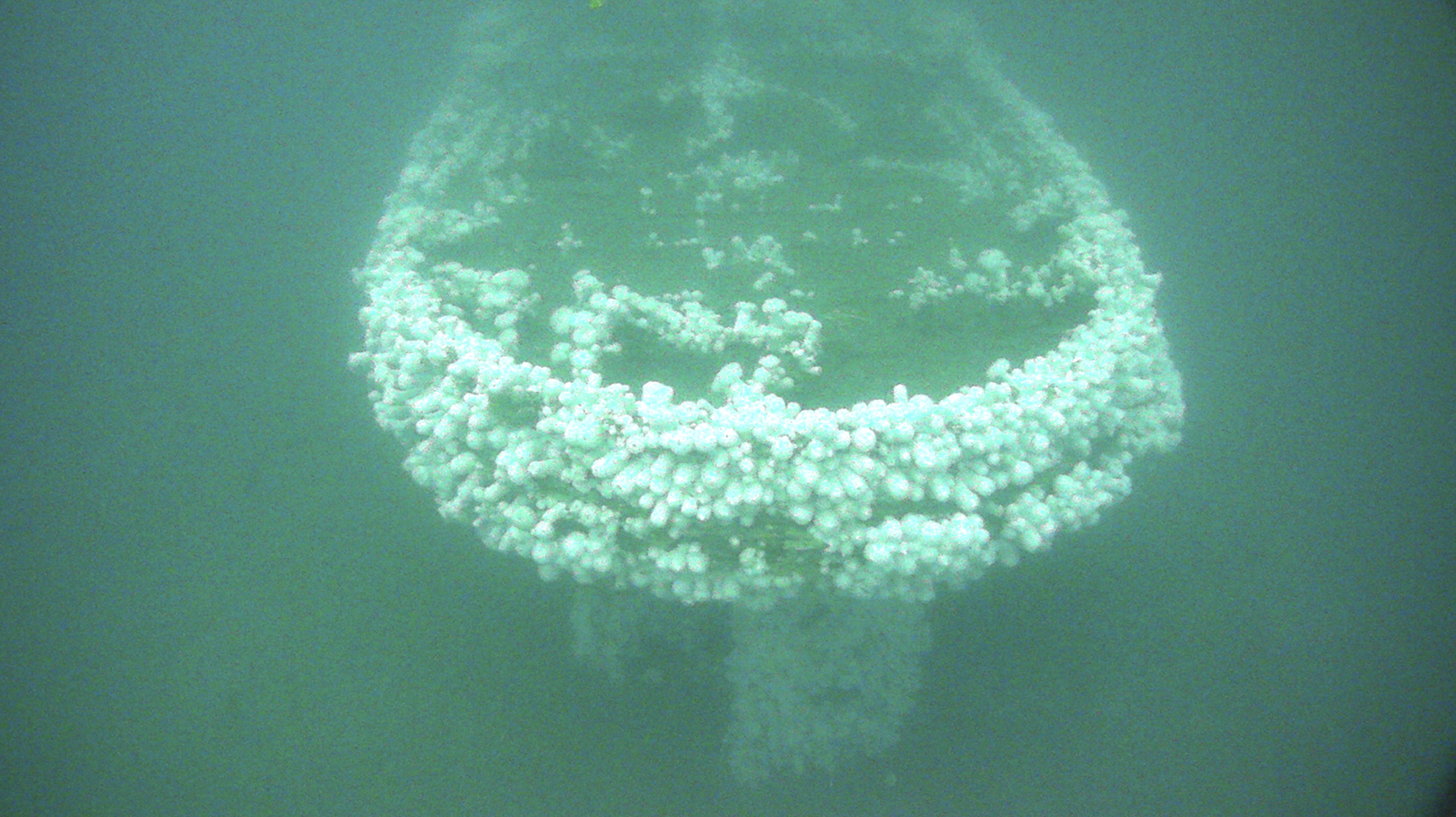
Wreck of the USS Conestoga

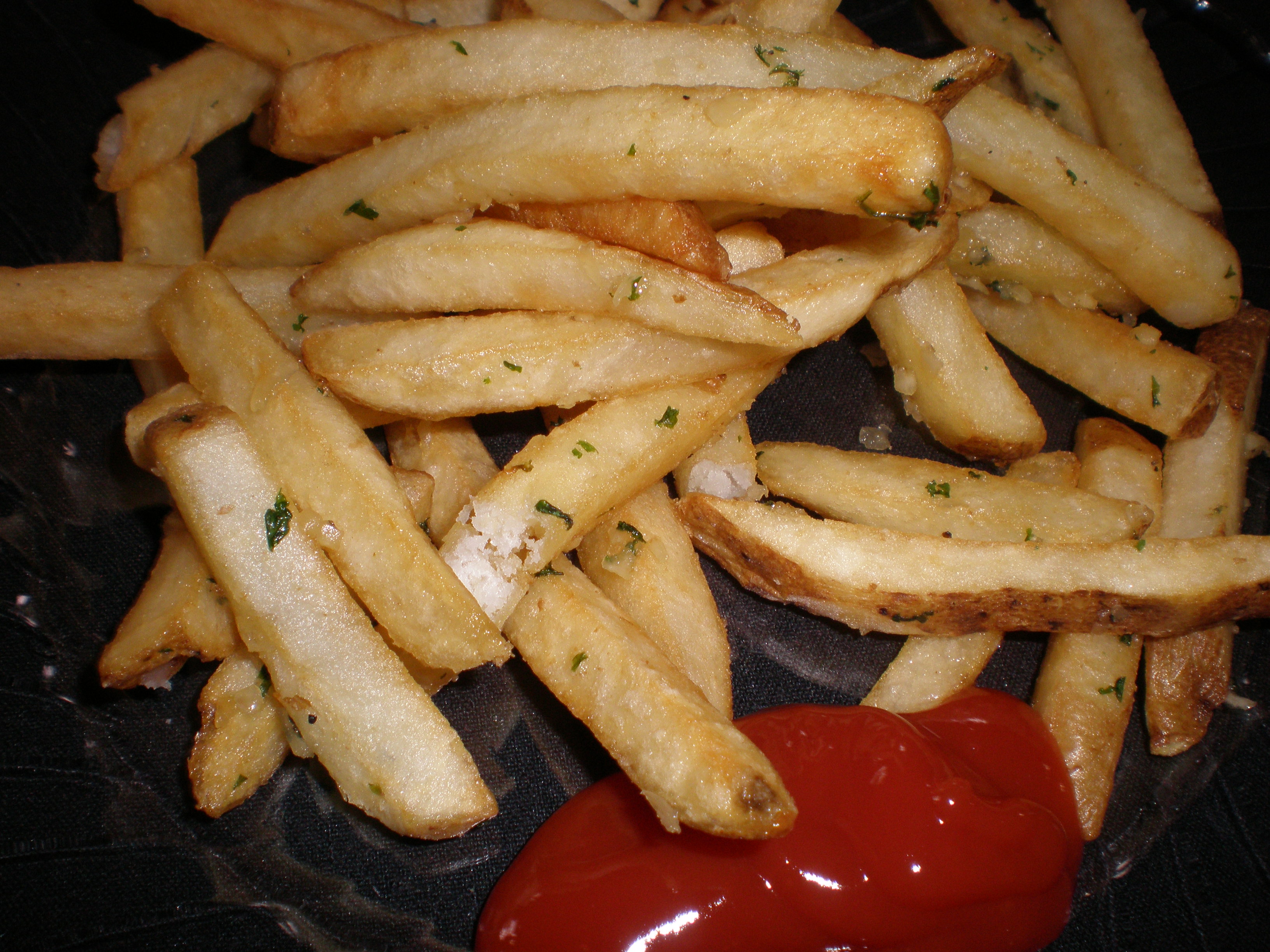
garlic fries at Gordon Biersch Brewing Company, originally based in San Jose

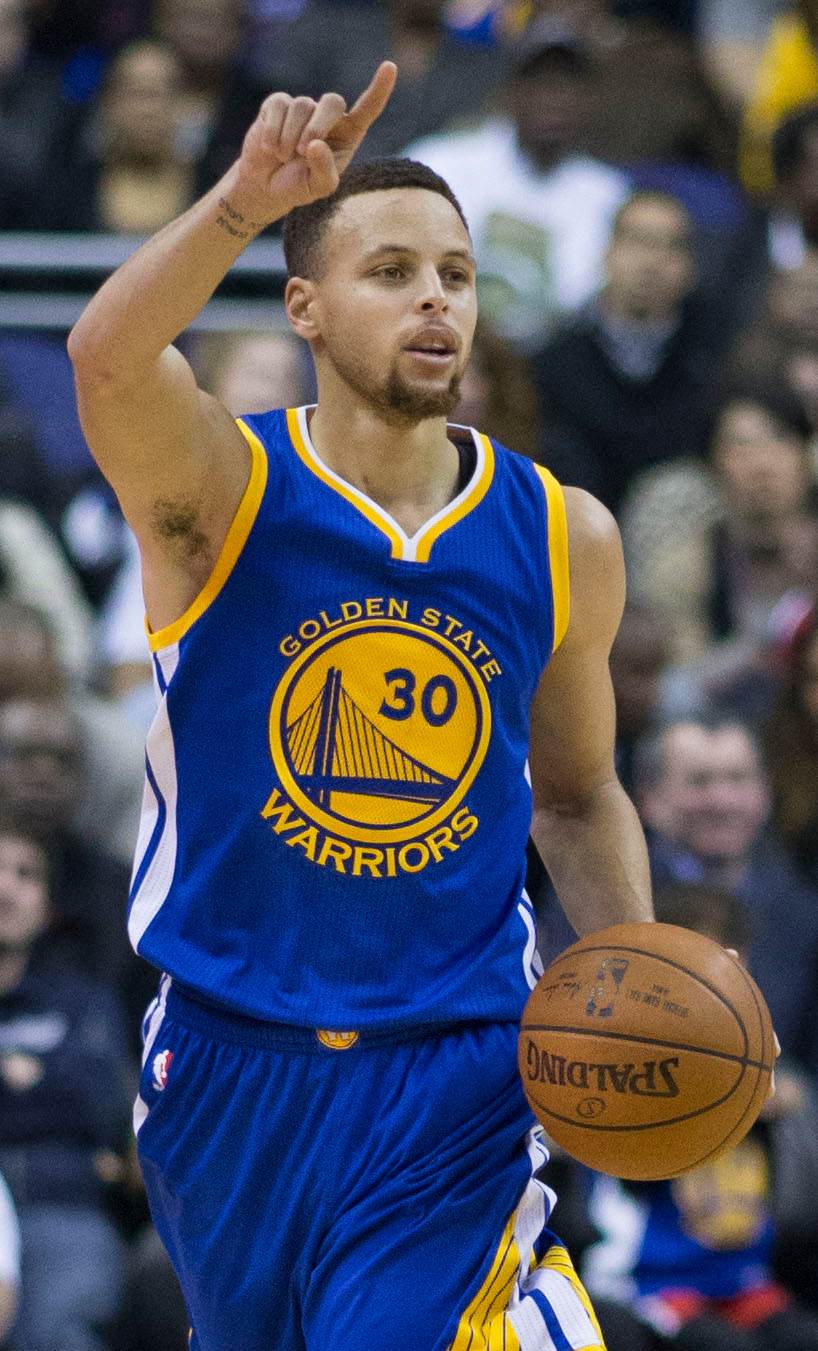
Stephen Curry

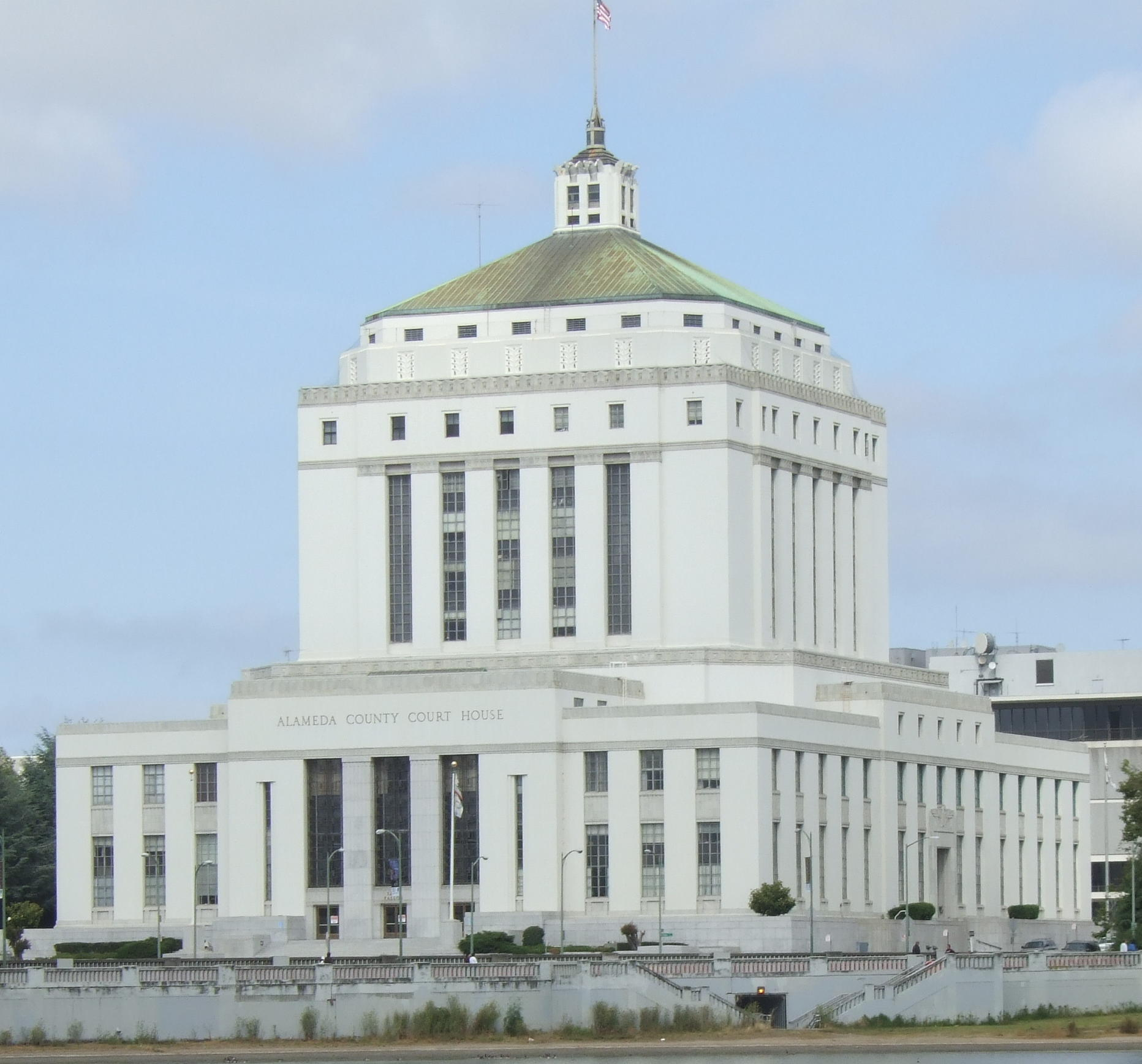
Renee Davidson Courthouse

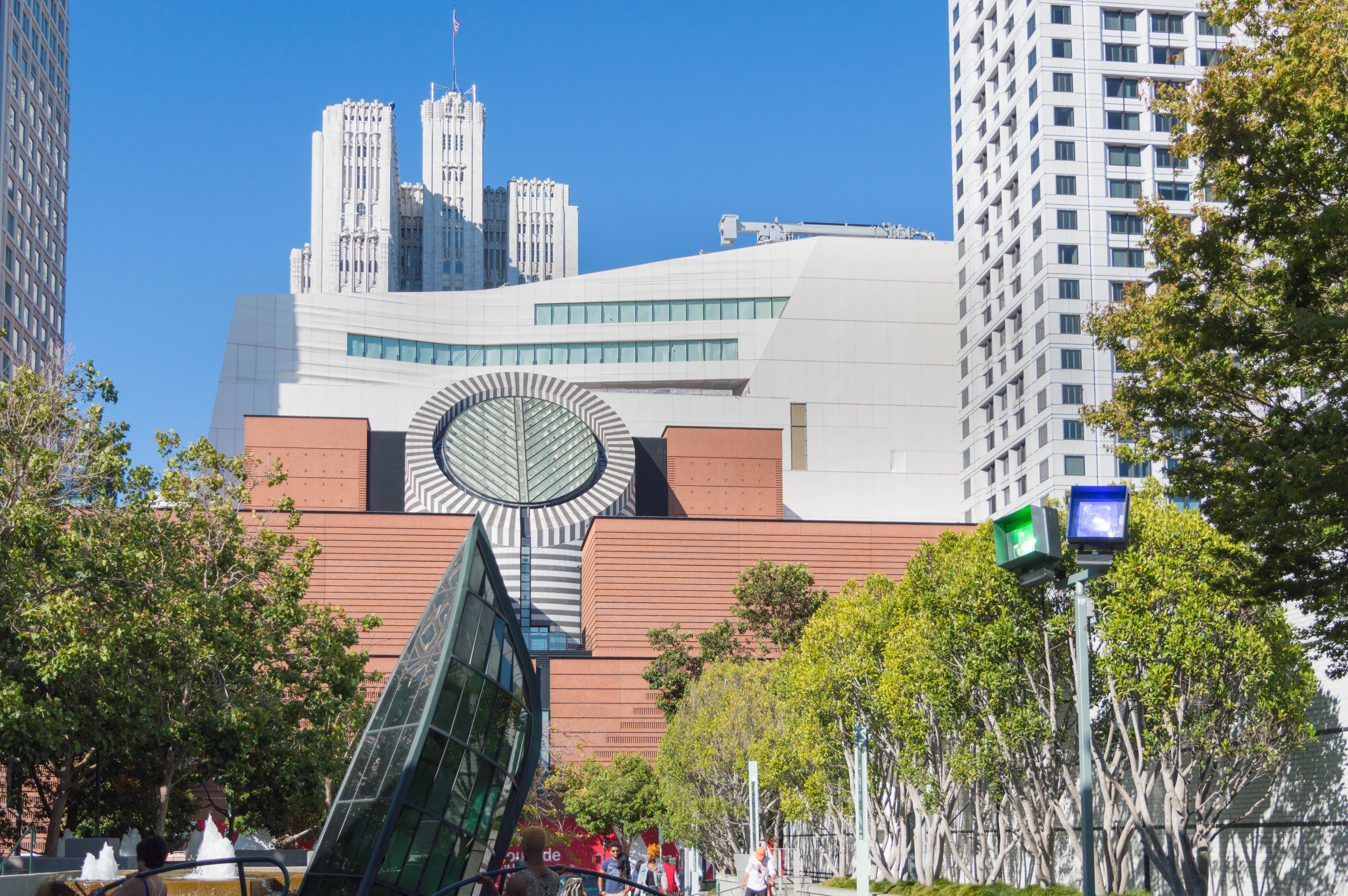
SFMOMA, with expansion

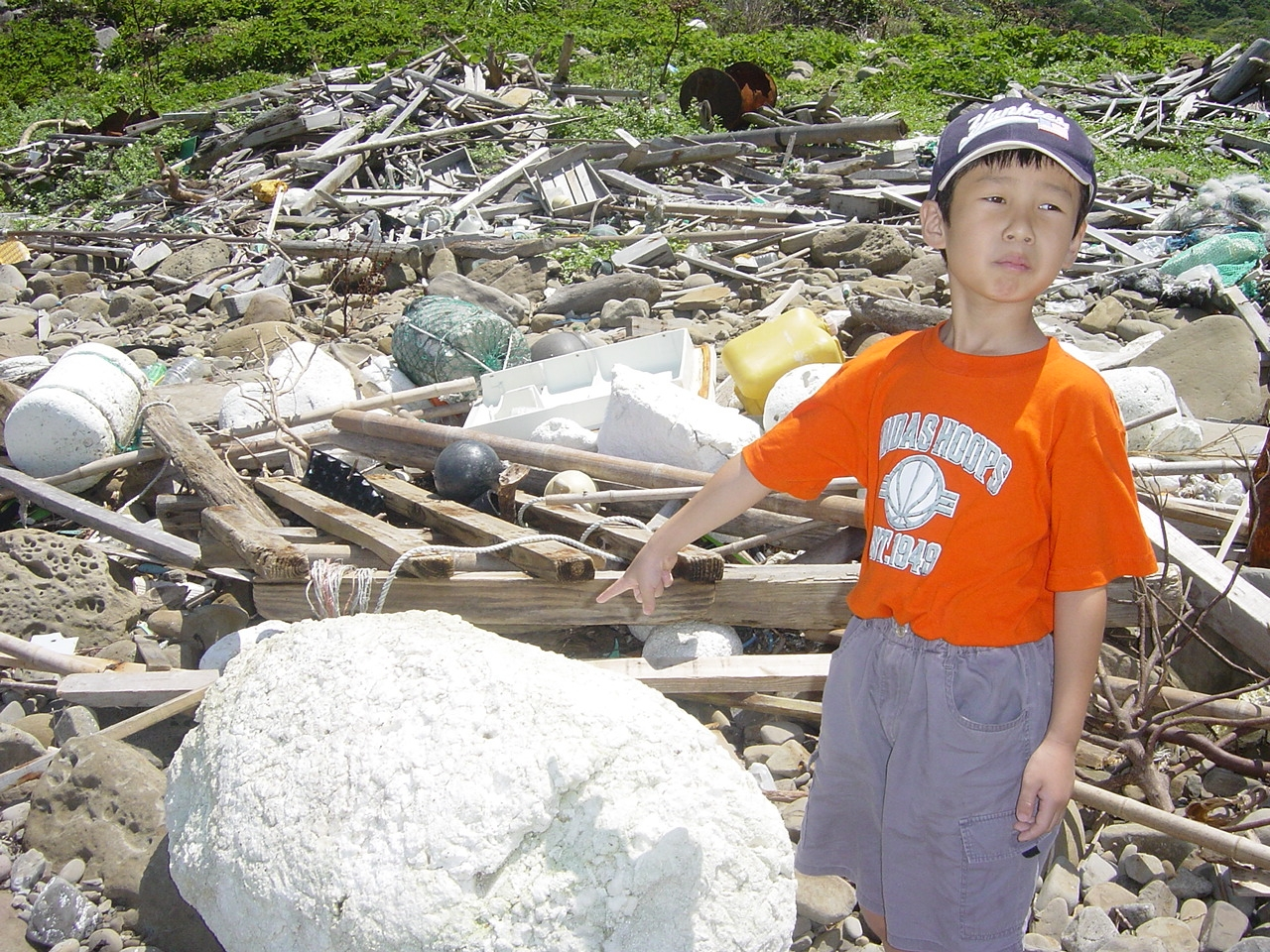
Styrofoam pollution, Japan

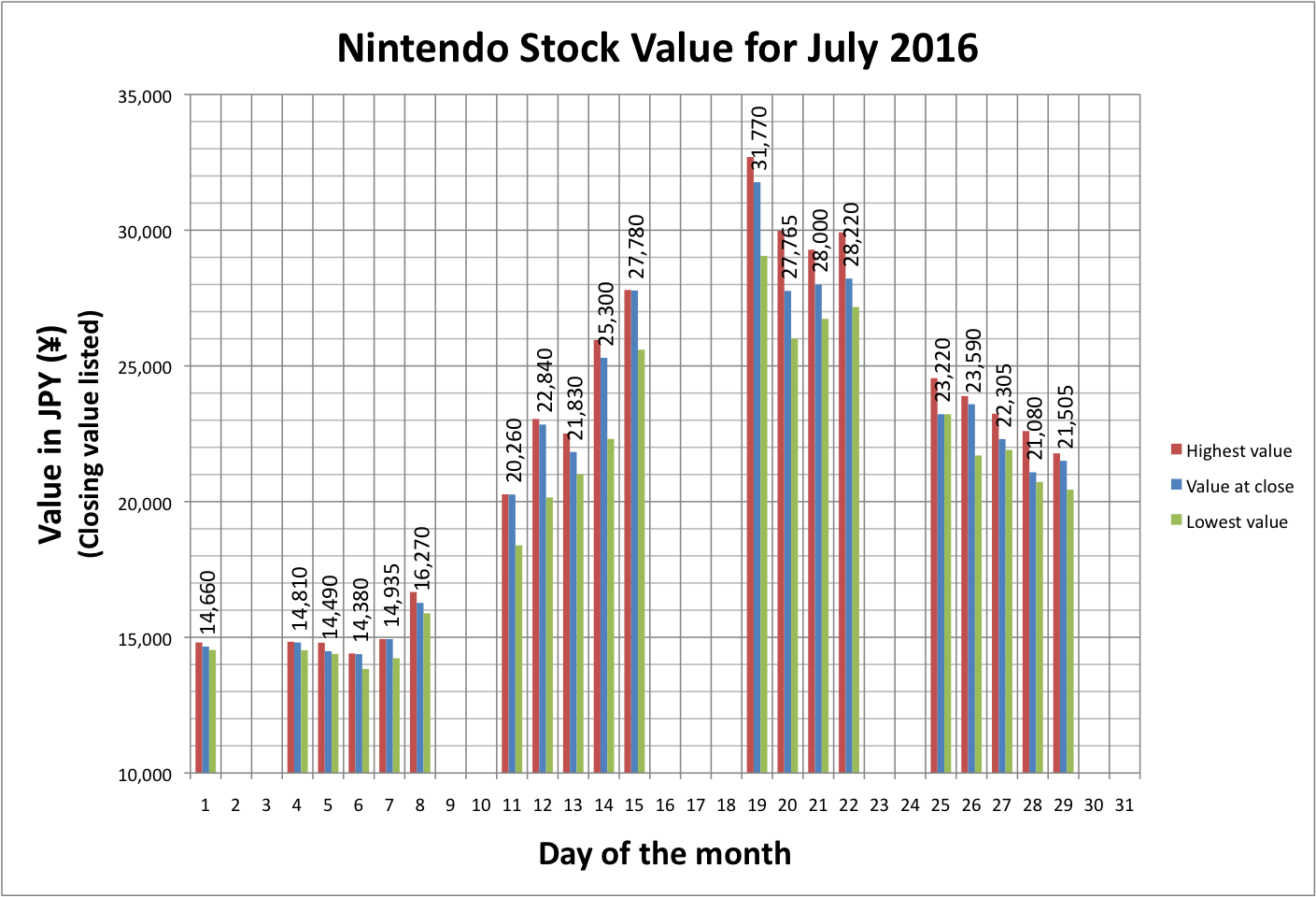
Stock value of Niantic during release of Pokémon GO

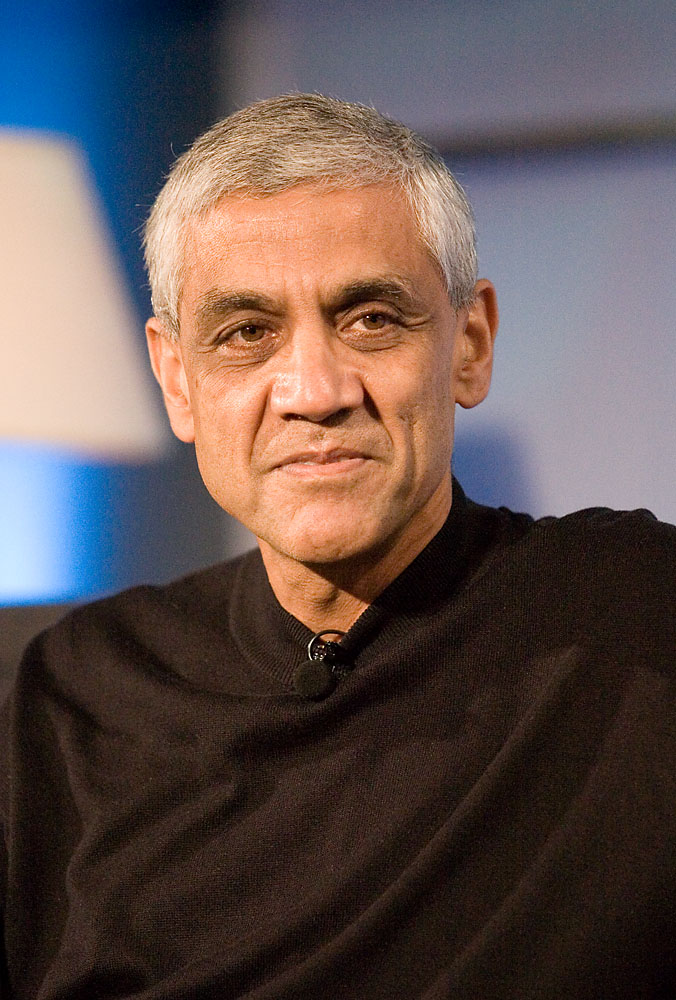
Vinod Khosla

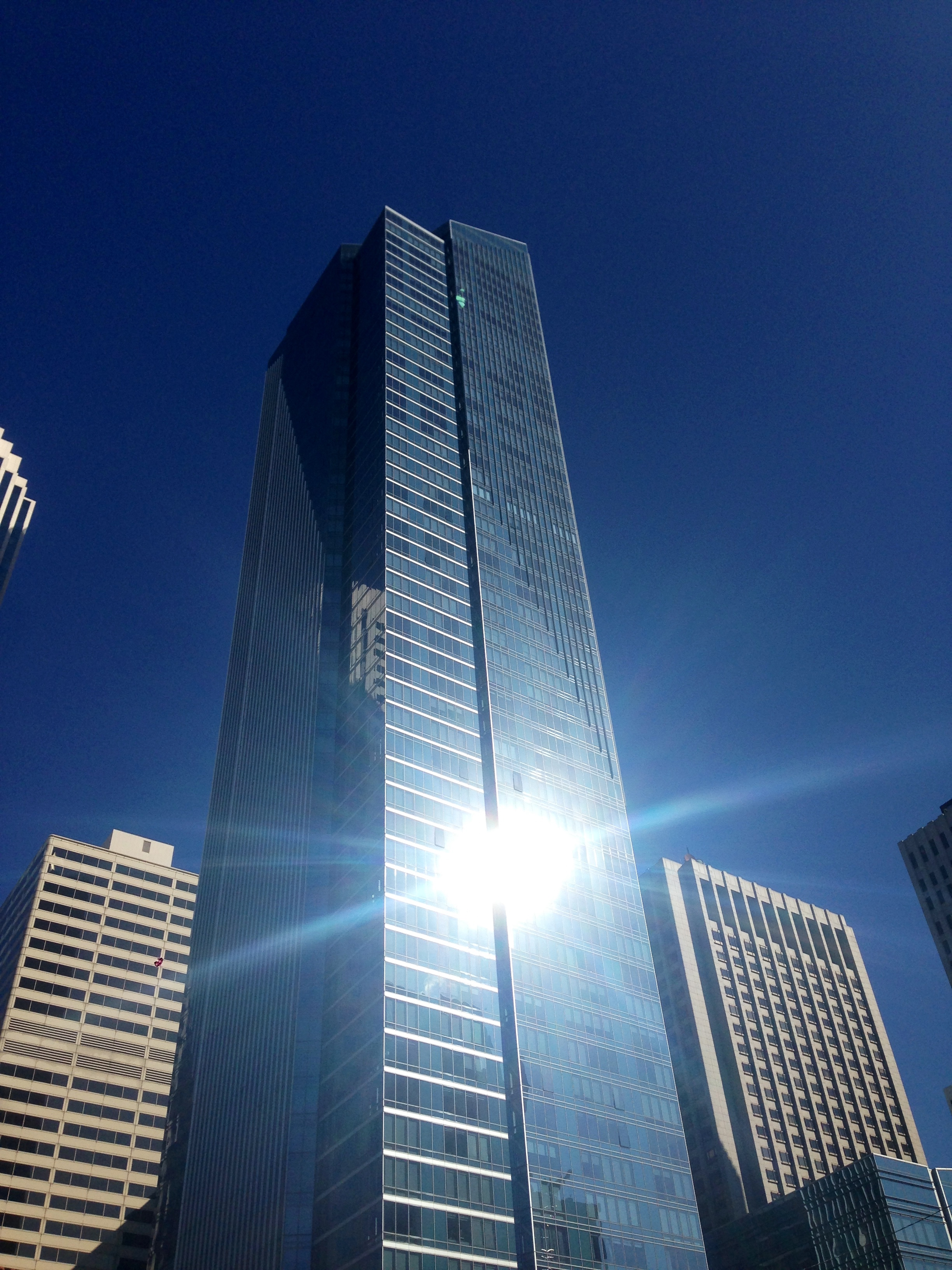
Millennium Tower, San Francisco

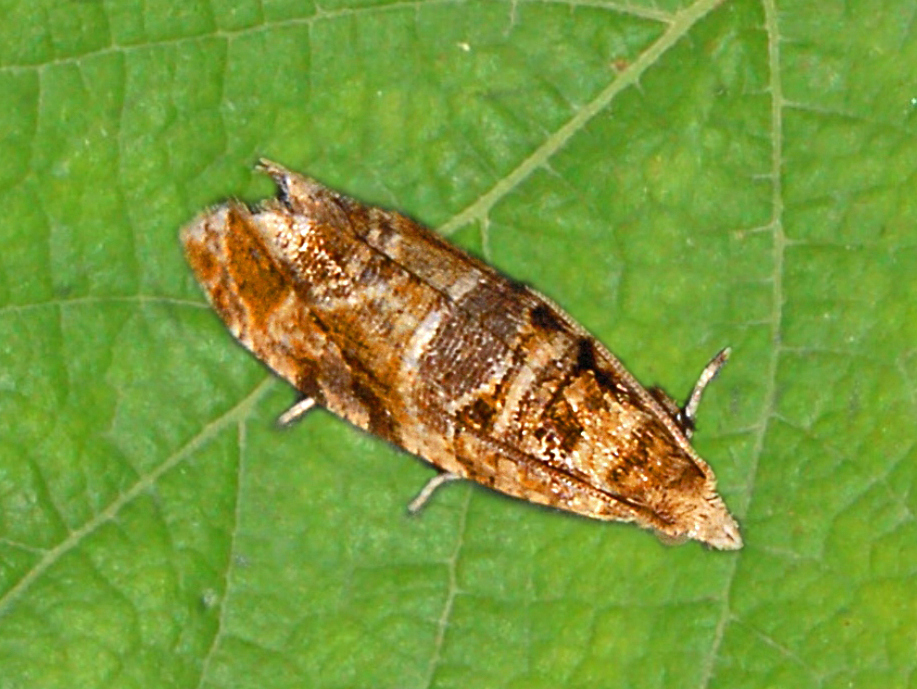
European grapevine moth

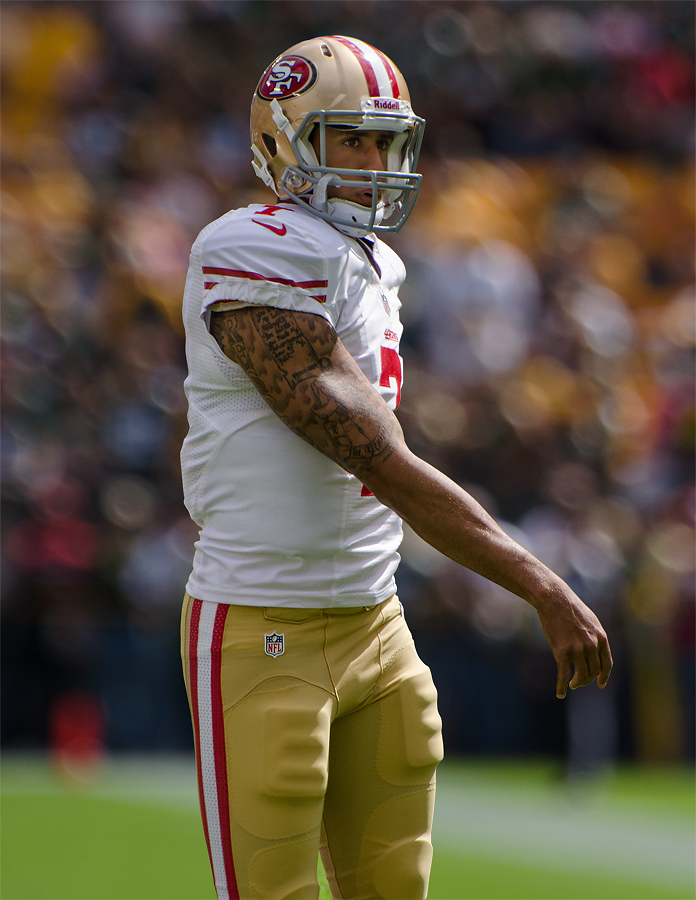
Colin Kaepernick

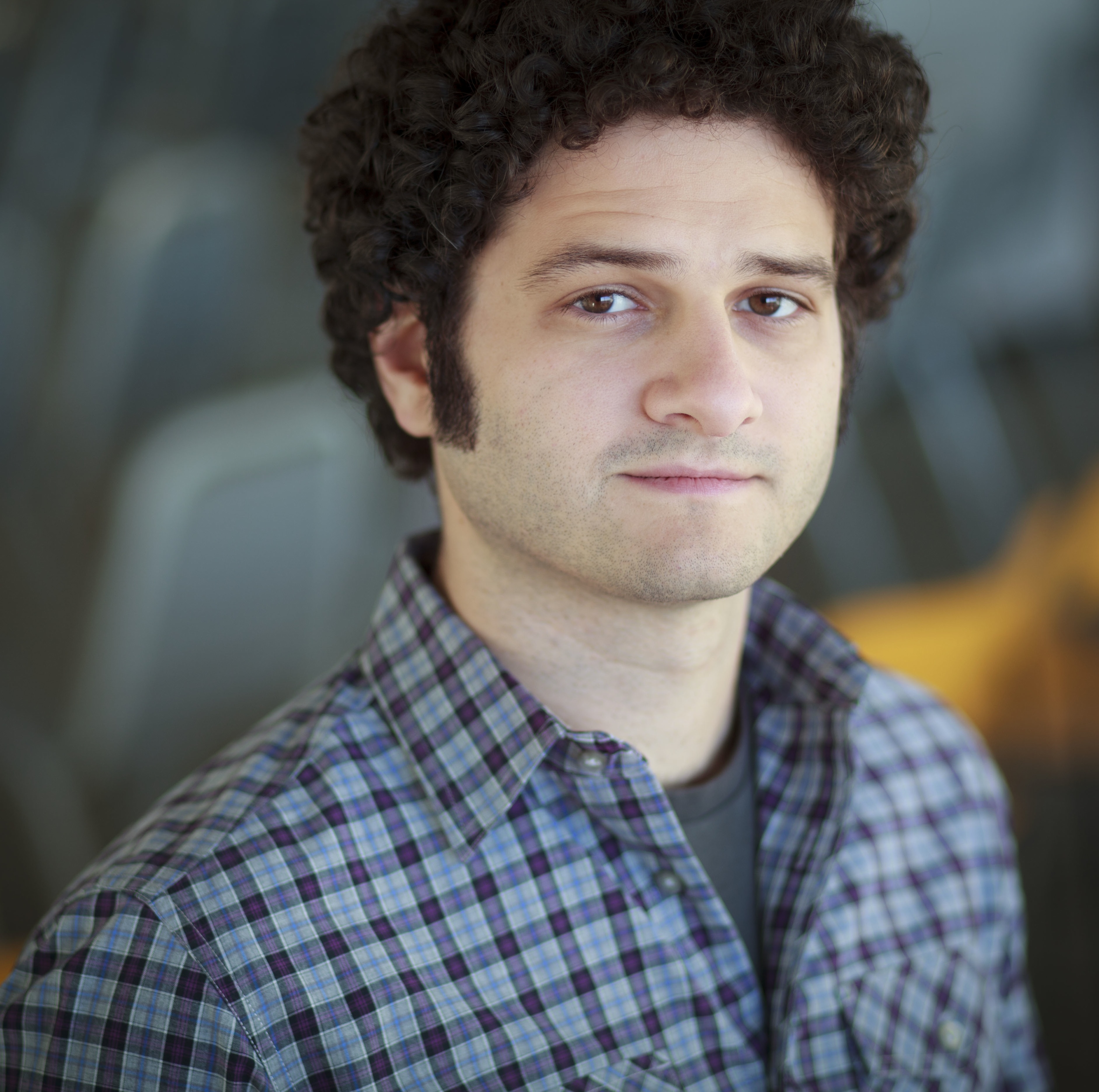
Dustin Moskovitz

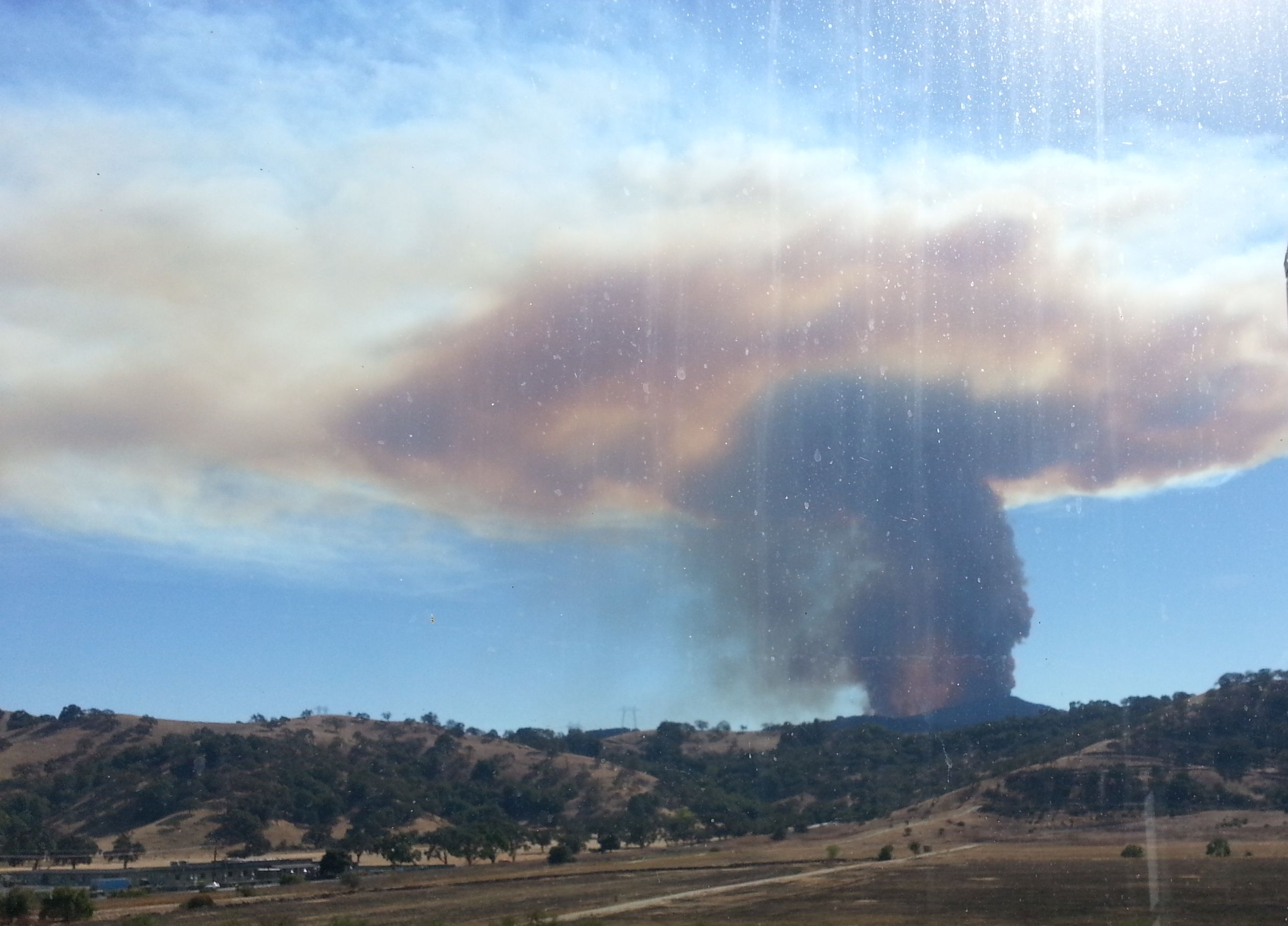
Loma Fire

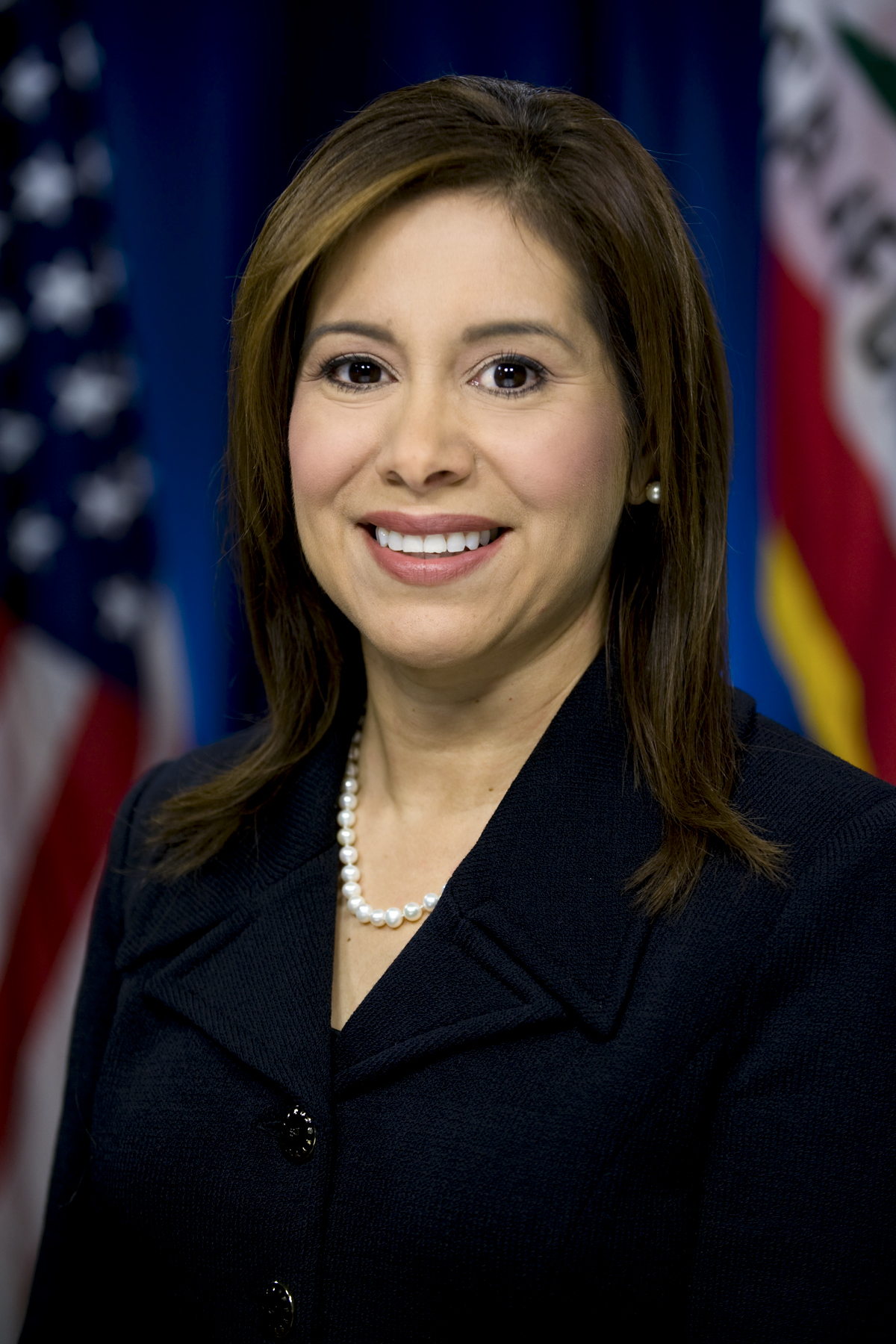
Nora Campos

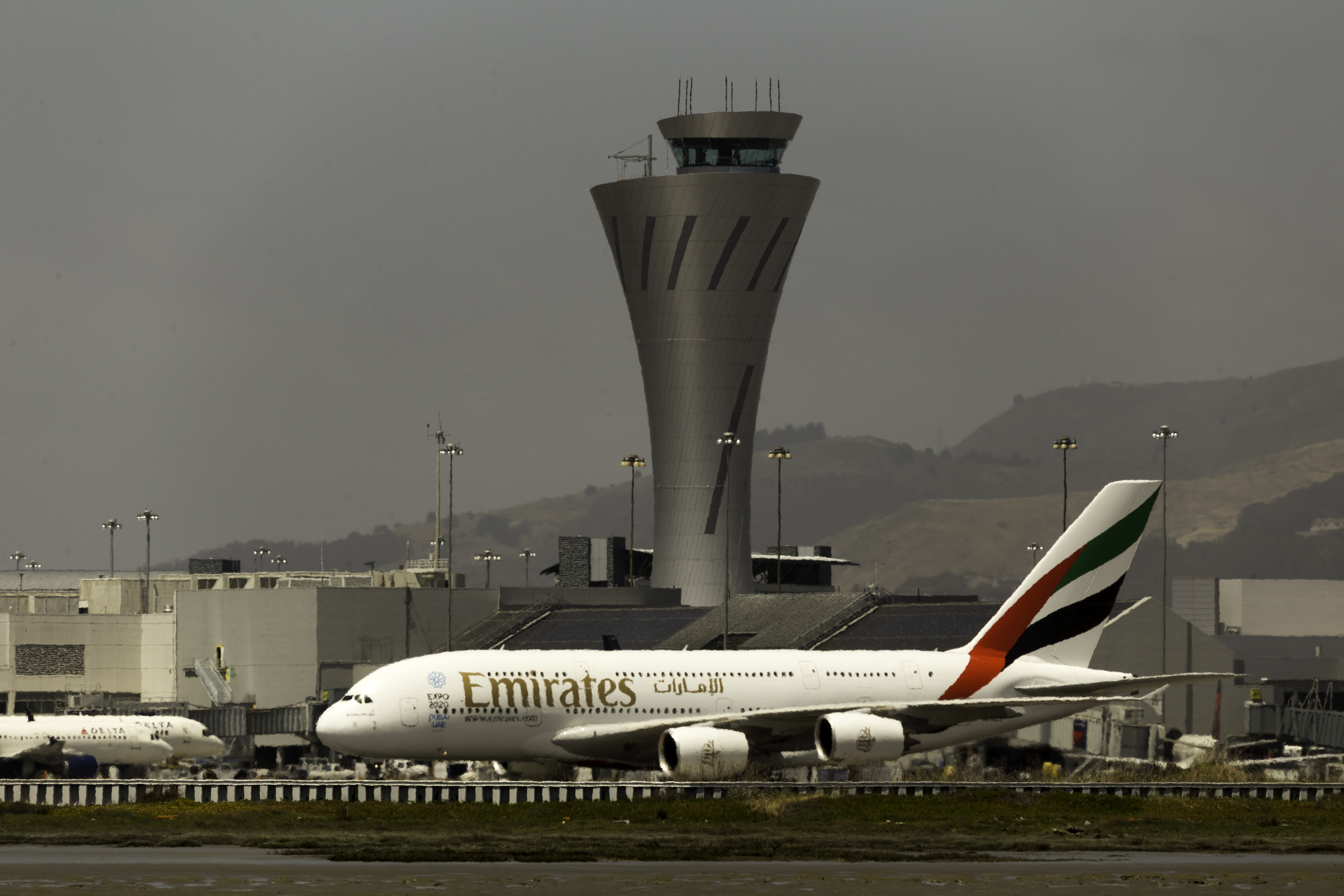
New control tower at SFO

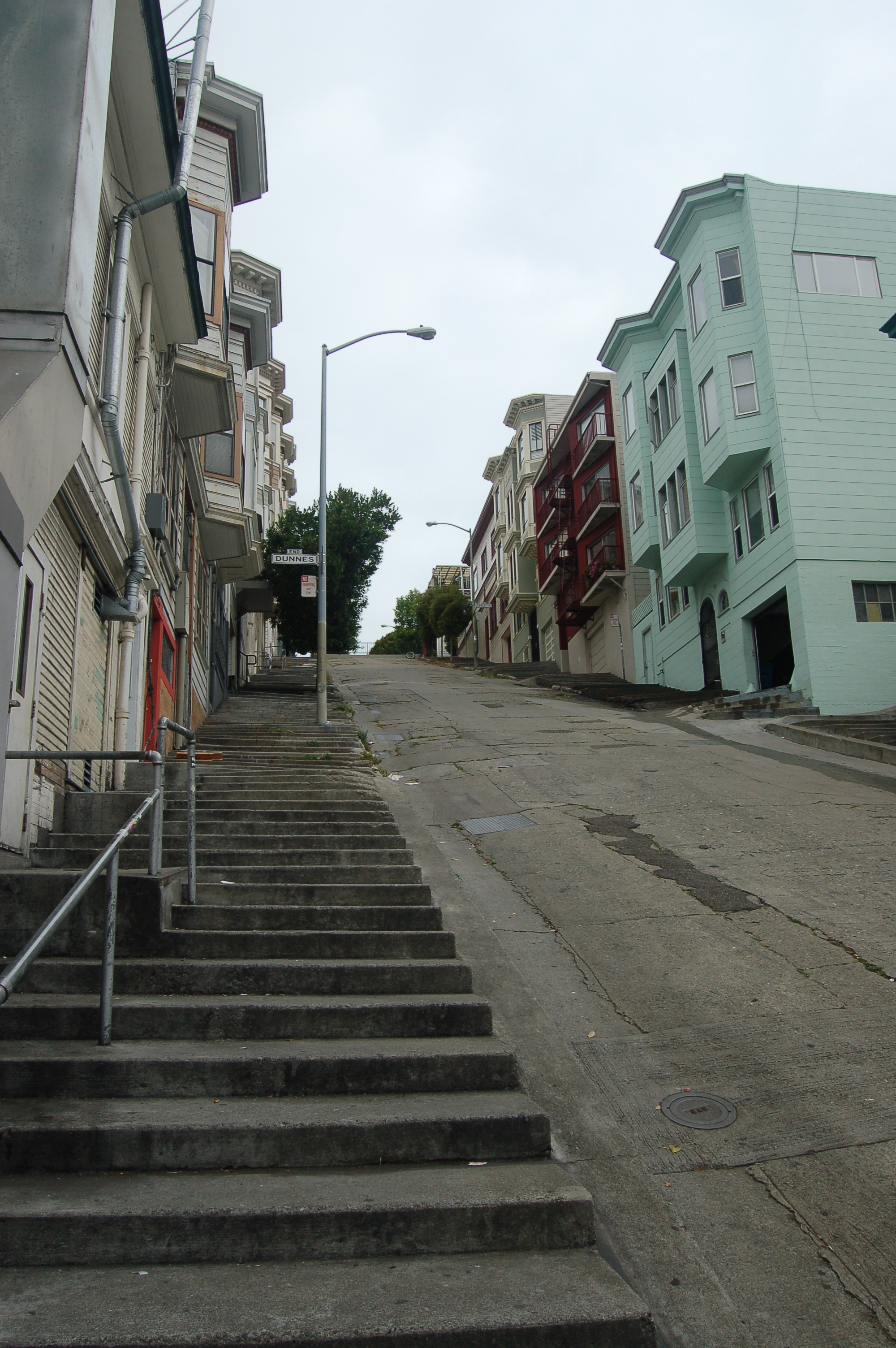
Kearny Street, San Francisco

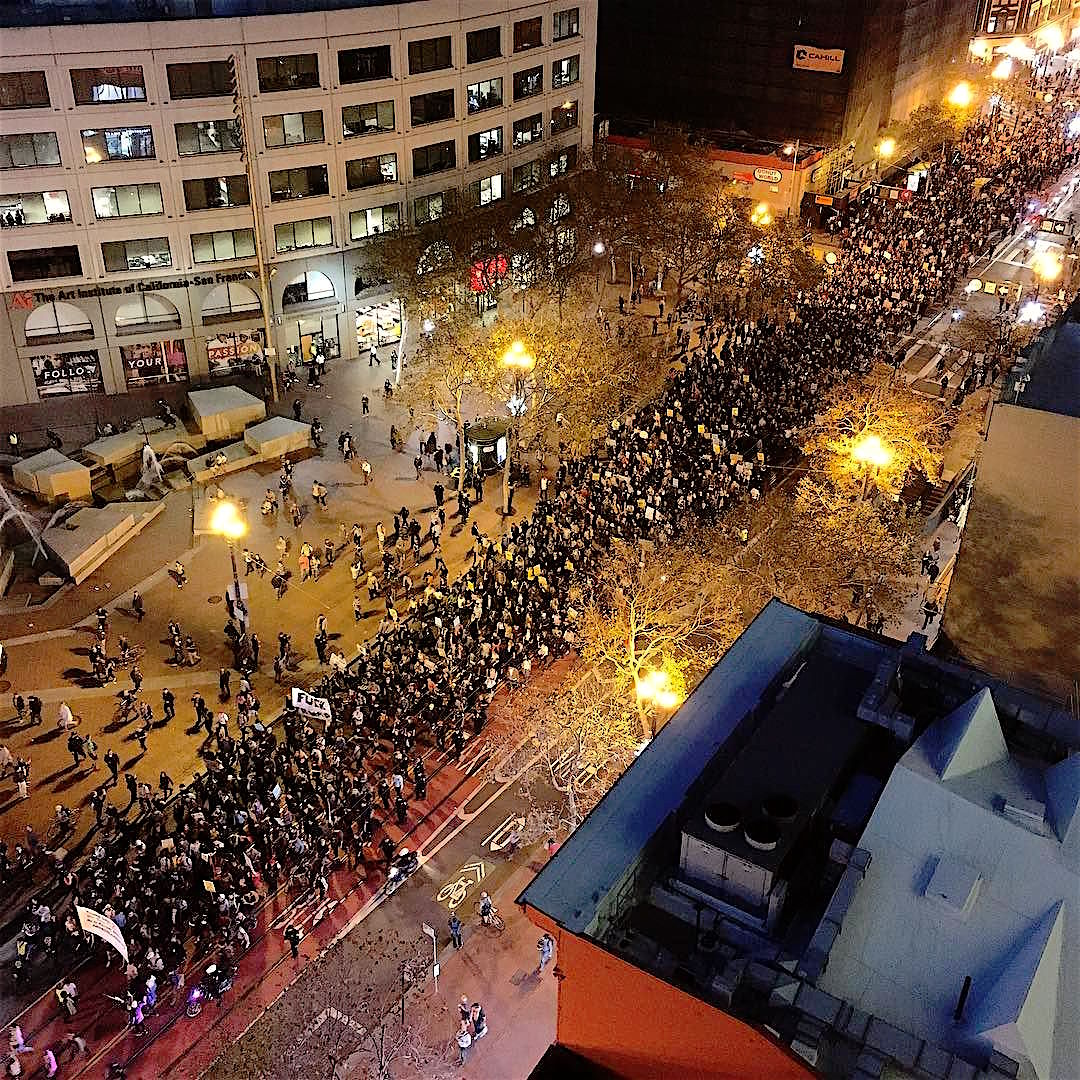
Protesters against Donald Trump, San Francisco

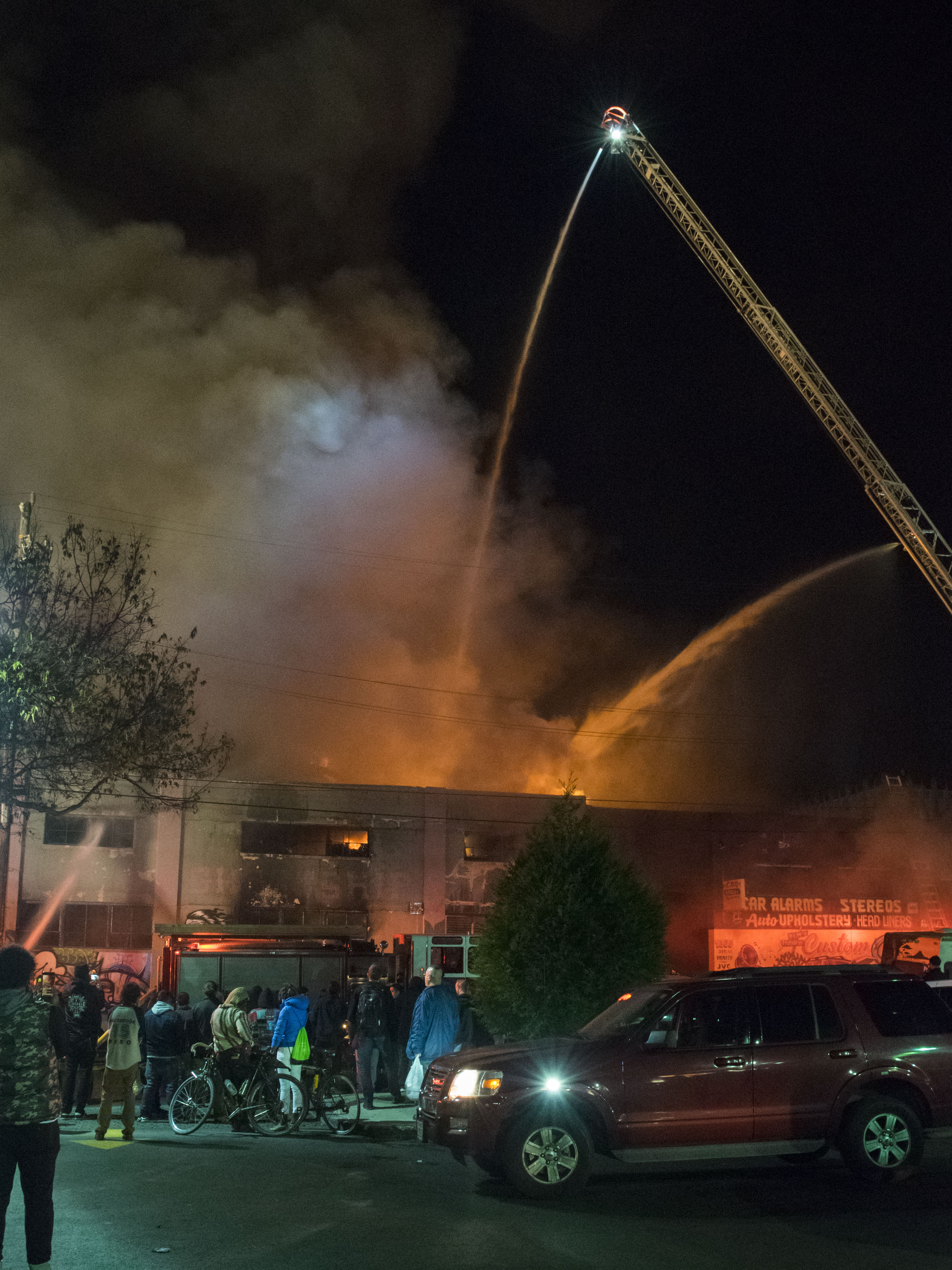
Oakland "Ghost Ship" warehouse fire

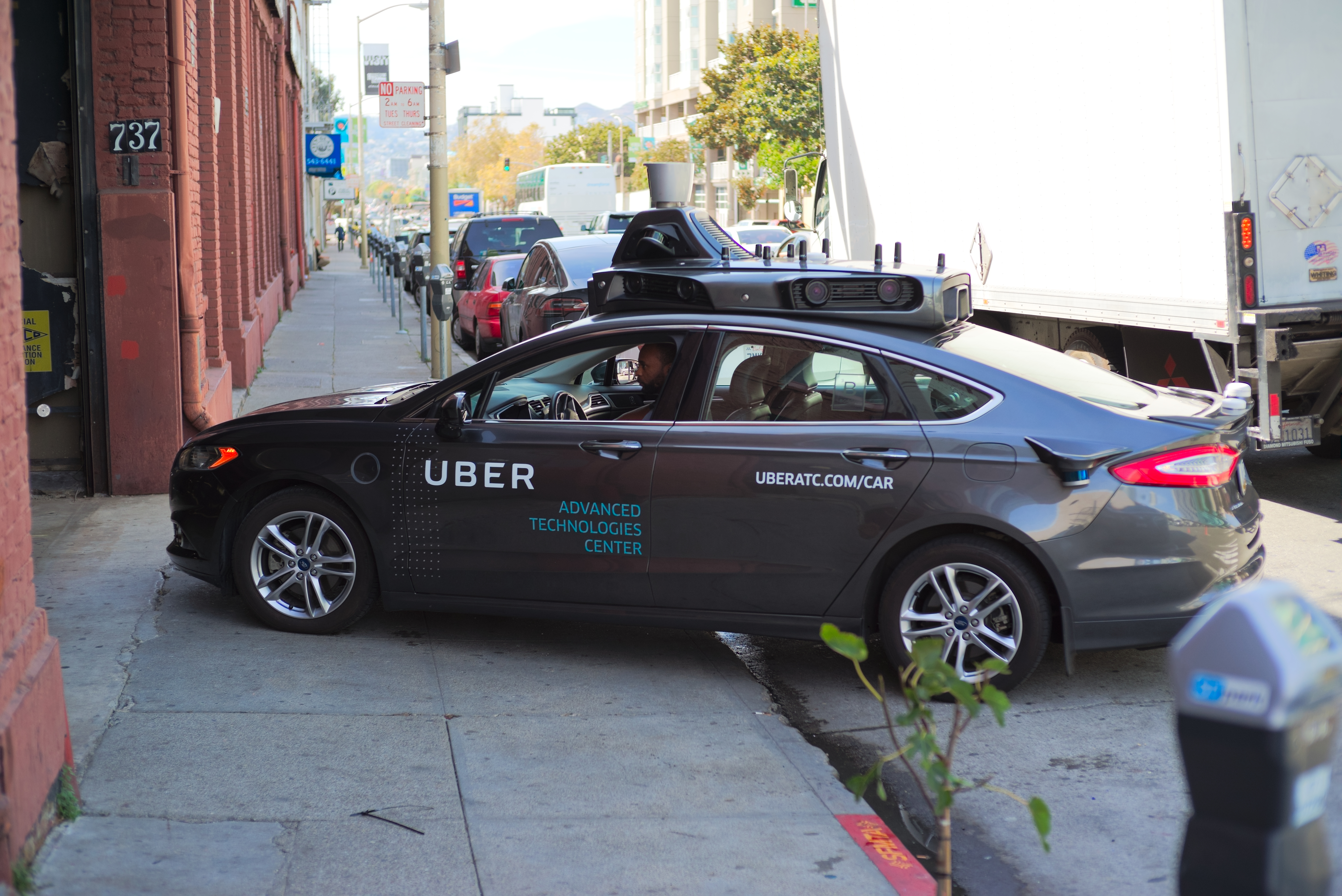
Uber self driving car (October 2016)

- January
  - Researchers at the Lawrence Berkeley National Laboratory, including Peidong Yang (pictured, above), announce they were able to induce Moorella thermoacetica to photosynthesize, despite its not being photosynthetic. It also synthesized semiconductor nanoparticles, thus using light to produce chemical products other than those produced in photosynthesis.
  - A federal court jury in San Francisco finds Raymond Chow Kwok-cheung guilty of all 162 charges against him, including murder, after a five year long undercover federal operation
  - William Del Monte, the last known survivor of the 1906 San Francisco earthquake, dies in Marin County at age 109
  - Paul Kantner (pictured), guitarist, vocalist and co-founder of Jefferson Airplane, dies in San Francisco
  - The Berkeley Art Museum and Pacific Film Archive opens its new building to the public (entrance pictured)
- February
  - The Denver Broncos beat the Carolina Panthers, in Super Bowl 50, held at Levi's Stadium (halftime show pictured)
  - Apple Inc says it will not comply with an FBI request to provide unblocking software for an IPhone owned by one of the perpetrators of the 2015 San Bernardino attack
- March
  - An Altamont Corridor Express train derails in Sunol
  - Ben Bagdikian, journalist, author, and dean emeritus at the University of California, Berkeley Graduate School of Journalism, dies in Berkeley
  - The first Silicon Valley Comic Con, organized by Steve Wozniak and Stan Lee, is held at the San Jose Convention Center
  - Former Intel CEO and chairman Andy Grove (pictured), one of the major figures in the growth of Silicon Valley, dies
  - The wreck of the USS Conestoga (pictured) is confirmed in the Greater Farallones National Marine Sanctuary, 95 years after it had gone missing
  - Tesla Motors announces the Model 3, pre-orders of which reach 115,000 within 4 hours of the announcement.
- April
  - The Oakland Tribune ceases publication after 142 years, and is replaced by the East Bay Times
  - Hundreds of pages of University of California, Berkeley records are released, showing a pattern of documented sexual harassment and firings of non-tenured staff
  - The San Francisco Board of Supervisors passes a parental leave law requiring employers to offer six weeks of fully paid leave for new parents, the first city in the US to do so.
  - The long closed UC Theatre in Berkeley, formerly a revival house movie theater, reopens as a music venue
  - The Golden State Warriors win against the Memphis Grizzlies, their 73rd win of the season, breaking the previous NBA record, held by the 1995–96 Chicago Bulls, for the most victories in a single season
  - Napster founder and philanthropist Sean Parker donates $250 million to create the Parker Institute for Cancer Immunotherapy, with funds going to over 300 scientists at 40 laboratories, in 6 institutions, including the University of California at San Francisco
  - The San Francisco Board of Supervisors passes a law requiring all new buildings below 10 stories to have rooftop solar panels, making it the first major US city to do so
  - Sanford and Joan Weill donate $185 million to the University of California, San Francisco to create the Weill Institute for Neurosciences
- May
  - A poll of 1,000 people, by the Bay Area Council, showed that 34 percent are considering leaving the area, due primarily to the high costs of living and housing, and traffic.
  - McDonald's tests garlic fries at four restaurants in the South Bay, using locally grown garlic from Gilroy (Gordon Biersch Brewing Company garlic fries pictured)
  - The Golden State Warriors' Stephen Curry (pictured) is named NBA MVP, in their first unanimous vote
  - It is revealed that the FBI hid microphones outside an Oakland Alameda County Superior Court building (pictured), between March 2010 and January 2011, as part of an investigation into bid rigging and fraud by Alameda and San Mateo County real estate investors, this done without a warrant
  - The San Francisco Museum of Modern Art (pictured) reopens after the completion of a two-and-a-half-year expansion, by architecture firm Snøhetta, more than doubling the gallery space
  - Pittsburg moves to install surveillance cameras along California State Route 4, in response to a series of 20 freeway shootings in the area that have taken the lives of six people, and injured 11, in the past year
  - Scientists find evidence of methane-producing microbes in water coming from underground at The Cedars, freshwater springs along Austin Creek in Sonoma County, the first time these methanogens that thrive in harsh environments have been discovered beyond the ocean floor
  - The San Jose Sharks win against the St. Louis Blues in the Stanley Cup ice hockey playoffs, advancing them to the Stanley Cup Finals, their first trip to the finals since their founding in 1991
  - San Francisco Police Chief Greg Suhr resigns after the officer-involved shooting death of a woman.
  - The Golden State Warriors beat Oklahoma City Thunder in the National Basketball Association Playoffs, and advance to the NBA Finals for the second consecutive year
- June
  - The San Francisco Bay Restoration Authority's ballot measure, the San Francisco Bay Clean Water, Pollution Prevention, and Habitat Restoration Program, passes with 2/3 of the vote in the 9 Bay Area counties, providing $500 million in funding for wetland restoration and other projects
  - Protesters attack Trump supporters at a Donald Trump campaign stop in San Jose, leaving one supporter bloodied after having their head bludgeoned
  - Public protest erupts over the sentencing of former Stanford University swimmer Brock Turner, convicted of three charges of felony sexual assault, to six months of jail and three years of probation, by Santa Clara County Superior Court judge Aaron Persky
  - Oakland Police Department chief Sean Whent steps down, while the department is being investigated for an alleged sex scandal possibly involving an underage girl, following the suicide of one officer associated with the scandal
  - Oakland mayor Libby Schaaf appoints City Administrator Sabrina Landreth as head of the Oakland Police Department, putting it under civilian control, after 3 police chiefs resign within 9 days, while the department is under multiple investigations
  - In San Francisco's highly volatile housing market, a North Beach resident's rent is increased by 344%, from $1,800 a month to $8,000, with him facing eviction for nonpayment
  - The Oakland City Council votes unanimously to ban the handling of coal and coke at the city's shipping and storage facilities, including the as yet unfinished Oakland Bulk and Oversized Terminal
  - Stanford University researchers, including study co-author Robert Jackson, find evidence for new groundwater in the California Central Valley, tripling the previous estimates for deep aquifer reserves in the region
  - The Sonoma Stompers professional baseball team add two female players to their roster, outfielder-pitcher Kelsie Whitmore and infielder Stacy Piagno, the first women to play professional baseball for a mixed-gender team in the US since the 1950s.
  - San Francisco bans the sale of products made from expanded polystyrene (typical pollution pictured), including packing material, buoys and cups, the most stringent ban on foam-type plastics in the US
- July
  - The augmented reality mobile game Pokémon GO, developed by San Francisco-based Niantic, Inc. (stock value at release pictured), is published by The Pokémon Company, reaching 15 million downloads within one week
  - More than 140 Silicon Valley technology figures, including Steve Wozniak, Vinod Khosla (pictured), and Twitter co-founder Evan Williams, sign a statement opposing Donald Trump's campaign for the presidency, saying it will potentially have a negative impact on innovation Silicon Valley Writes a Protest Letter Against Trump
  - Verizon Communications announces their intent to acquire Yahoo's internet business for US$4.8 billion
- August
  - The San Francisco Millennium Tower (pictured) is found to have sunk 16 inches since construction, and is tilting 2 inches towards the northwest
  - California declares that Napa County, and California, are free of the invasive species Lobesia botrana (pictured), known as the "European grapevine moth", with no moths found since June 2014
  - A statue of Tony Bennett is unveiled outside the Fairmont Hotel, the venue at which he first sang "I Left My Heart in San Francisco" in 1961
  - Governor Jerry Brown signs legislation banning the use of state transportation funds for new coal export terminals, in response to a developer's failed proposal to build a coal terminal at the Port of Oakland
  - San Francisco 49ers quarterback Colin Kaepernick (pictured) refuses to stand for the national anthem at a preseason football game, in protest of police brutality and racism in the United States
- September
  - Napa Valley's Margrit Mondavi, the widow of wine pioneer Robert Mondavi, and advocate for the culture of the region, dies at her home in Napa at age 91
  - Facebook co-founder Dustin Moskovitz (pictured) donates $20 million to a number of elections organizations, with the express purpose of supporting Democratic Party candidates and issues, and defeating Donald Trump, making him the 3rd largest donor in the 2016 campaigns
  - Discovery Bay former realtor Marco Gutierrez, the co-founder of Latinos for Trump, says to Joy Reid on MSNBC that Mexican culture in the US is "dominant" and that "If you don't do something about it, you're going to have taco trucks on every corner"
  - Influential San Francisco political activist and broker Rose Pak, an advocate for the Chinatown community, dies in San Francisco
  - The Chan Zuckerberg Initiative announces a new science program, Chan Zuckerberg Science, with $3 billion in investment over the next decade, with the goal of helping to cure, manage, or prevent all disease by the year 2100. $600 million is to be spent on Biohub, a location in San Francisco's Mission Bay District near the University of California, San Francisco
  - The Sawmill Fire breaks out in rural Cloverdale, near The Geysers, in Sonoma County, followed by the Loma Fire (pictured) in the Santa Cruz Mountains
  - The MacArthur "Genius" grant recipients are announced, including Stanford University bioengineering professor and inventor Manu Prakash, San Jose graphic novelist Gene Luen Yang, and San Francisco sculptor Vincent Fecteau
  - The San Francisco Board of Supervisors passes a law, authored by Scott Wiener, barring the city from doing business with companies that have a home base in states such as North Carolina, Tennessee, and Mississippi, that forbid civil rights protections for lesbian, gay, bisexual and transgender people
- October
  - Theranos announces it will close its laboratory operations, shutter its wellness centers and lay off around 40 percent of its work force, while focusing on an initiative to create miniature medical testing machines
  - Researchers led by Ali Javey at the Lawrence Berkeley National Laboratory announce the creation of a transistor with a working 1-nanometer gate, the smallest transistor reported to date
  - A new California law, authored by San Jose Assemblywoman Nora Campos (pictured), will allow San Jose to be the first California city to create "tiny homes" for the homeless, bypassing some state building codes
  - The new control tower (pictured) at San Francisco International Airport (SFO) begins operating
  - The US Justice Department's Office of Community Oriented Policing Services releases a 432-page report stating that the San Francisco Police Department stops and searches African Americans at a higher rate than other groups, and inadequately investigates officers use of force. The report details "numerous indicators of implicit and institutionalized bias against minority groups", with a large majority of suspects killed by police being people of color
  - Peninsula Clean Energy begins providing electricity to 20 percent of residential customers in San Mateo County, all municipalities, and all small- to mid-size businesses, as a Community Choice Aggregation program, an alternative to Pacific Gas and Electric
  - Wells Fargo chairman and CEO John Stumpf announces he will retire, shortly after the bank is issued $185 million in fines for creating over 1.5 million checking and savings accounts and 500,000 credit cards that its customers never authorized. This includes $100 million in fines from the Consumer Financial Protection Bureau, the largest in the agency's history.
  - Tesla Motors posts a profitable quarter, their first in 8 quarters, defying industry expectations
- November
  - The San Francisco – Oakland Metropolitan Region has the worst road conditions of any major US metropolitan area (71% rated "poor"), with the San Jose region rated third nationwide (59%) (street of San Francisco pictured)
  - The nine Bay Area counties all vote overwhelmingly for Hillary Clinton for president, from 62% (Solano County) to 85% (San Francisco)
  - Hundreds of people turn out in San Francisco (pictured), Oakland and Berkeley, protesting the election of Donald Trump to the presidency, blocking freeways, lighting fires and chanting, "Not our president" and "Fuck Trump"
  - Half the students at Berkeley High School, as well as students at Oakland Technical High School, Oakland's Bishop O'Dowd High School, and high schools in San Jose and Contra Costa County walk out of classes the morning after Donald Trump is elected president
  - The cities of San Francisco, Oakland and Albany pass 1 cent/ounce soda taxes, to combat health risks from excessive sugar consumption
  - Protesters against President-Elect Donald Trump join hands around Lake Merritt in Oakland
  - Mayor Ed Lee declares that San Francisco will remain a sanctuary city, in response to the election of Donald Trump as president, stating, "I know that there are a lot of people who are angry and frustrated and fearful, but our city's never been about that. We have been and always have been a city of refuge, a city of sanctuary, a city of love."
  - With the approval of both companies' shareholders, Tesla Motors will merge with SolarCity, which will expedite Elon Musk's plans to introduce solar roofing tiles to integrate with home automobile charging
  - An American-born, non-Muslim woman in Fremont, finds a note on her car, reading "Hijab wearing bitch this is our nation now get the fuck out", after making a peace walk to the top of Mission Peak, where presumably the note writer had observed her wearing a head scarf, which she wears to protect her scalp from the sun, due to having lupus. The incident is part of a wave of 437 incidents of hateful intimidation or harassment, since the presidential election, according to the Southern Poverty Law Center
  - During a concert at the SAP Center at San Jose, Kanye West is booed by shoe-throwing fans, as he goes on a political tirade, including stating that he had not voted in the presidential election, but that "If I would have voted, I would have voted for Trump"
  - San Jose teacher and transgender activist Dana Rivers (formerly David Warfield), who made headlines in 1999 for fighting unsuccessfully to keep a teaching position in Sacramento after sharing her transition with her high school students, is arrested in Oakland, charged with the murders of 3 acquaintances: married couple Patricia Wright and Charlotte Reed, and their 19-year-old son, Toto Diambu-Wright
  - Robert P. Goldman, professor of Sanskrit at the University of California, Berkeley, publishes the 7th and final volume of his translation of the critical edition of Valmikis epic poem, the Ramayana, one of the foundational texts in the history of India, with core themes dating back to the Vedic period
  - Copies of an anti-Muslim letter are sent to the Evergreen Islamic Center in San Jose, and Islamic Centers in Long Beach and Claremont, reading, in part, "Your day of reckoning has arrived, there's a new sheriff in town — President Donald Trump. He's going to cleanse America and make it shine again. And, he's going to start with you Muslims... [he is] going to do to you Muslims what Hitler did to the jews [sic]."
  - A liberal household in Concord is targeted at night by vandals, who plant 56 United States flags defaced with pro-Trump remarks such as "Build The Damn Wall" and "I Luv The Donald", and who then cut the house's power, causing a loud explosion
  - The San Francisco Municipal Transportation Agency is hit by hackers, using ransomware, demanding $70,000 in bitcoins, with fare machines reading "OUT OF SERVICE", resulting in passengers riding for free
  - Kuntzman, Gersh (November 29, 2016). "Donald Trump is a 'fascist,' says landmark Supreme Court case 'flag-burner' Gregory Lee Johnson". nydailynews.com. Archived from the original on November 30, 2016. San Francisco area activist Gregory Lee Johnson, the defendant in the landmark 1989 Supreme Court decision Texas v. Johnson abolishing laws against flag burning on free speech grounds, declares that Donald Trump is "using the bully pulpit for fascism and forced patriotism", after Trump tweets "Nobody should be allowed to burn the American flag — if they do, there must be consequences — perhaps loss of citizenship or year in jail!"
- December
  - A fire at an Oakland warehouse (pictured), which was hosting a music event, kills 36 people, the deadliest fire in Oakland history.
  - The Biomimetic Millisystems Lab at the University of California, Berkeley designs a wall-jumping robot, called Salto (Latin for jump), modelled after the galago, and which is described as the most vertically agile robot ever built
  - John Stewart, chief judge at the San Francisco Superior Court, discards 66,000 arrest warrants for criminal infractions, like sleeping on the sidewalk, public urination and public drunkenness, stating "You're putting somebody in jail because they're poor and can't pay a fine. We got a lot of criticism, but we thought it was the right thing to do."
  - More than 300 Silicon Valley technology company employees sign a letter declaring they will not help build a registry, for the upcoming Trump Administration, to be used to track Muslims in the United States, stating "We refuse to build a database of people based on their Constitutionally-protected religious beliefs. We refuse to facilitate mass deportations of people the government believes to be undesirable"
  - Uber rolled out self-driving cars (test vehicle pictured) in San Francisco, its headquarter city, and is almost immediately ordered to stop the service by the California Department of Motor Vehicles, which cited it as illegal until an autonomous vehicle testing permit is acquired
  - Yahoo reports that hackers had, in 2013, stolen data on more than 1 billion user accounts, the largest hack worldwide to date
  - Apple, Google, Uber and Twitter all took the Never Again pledge, declaring that they will not support the development of a registry of Muslims in the United States as proposed by President-Elect Donald Trump
  - Scientists at Stanford University and the SLAC National Accelerator Laboratory created the world's thinnest wire, 3 atoms thick, using diamondoids to aid the manufacturing process
2017

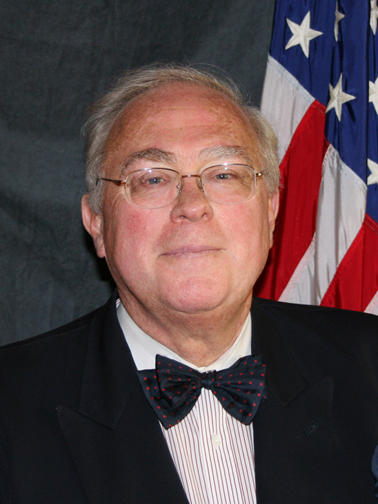
Kevin Starr

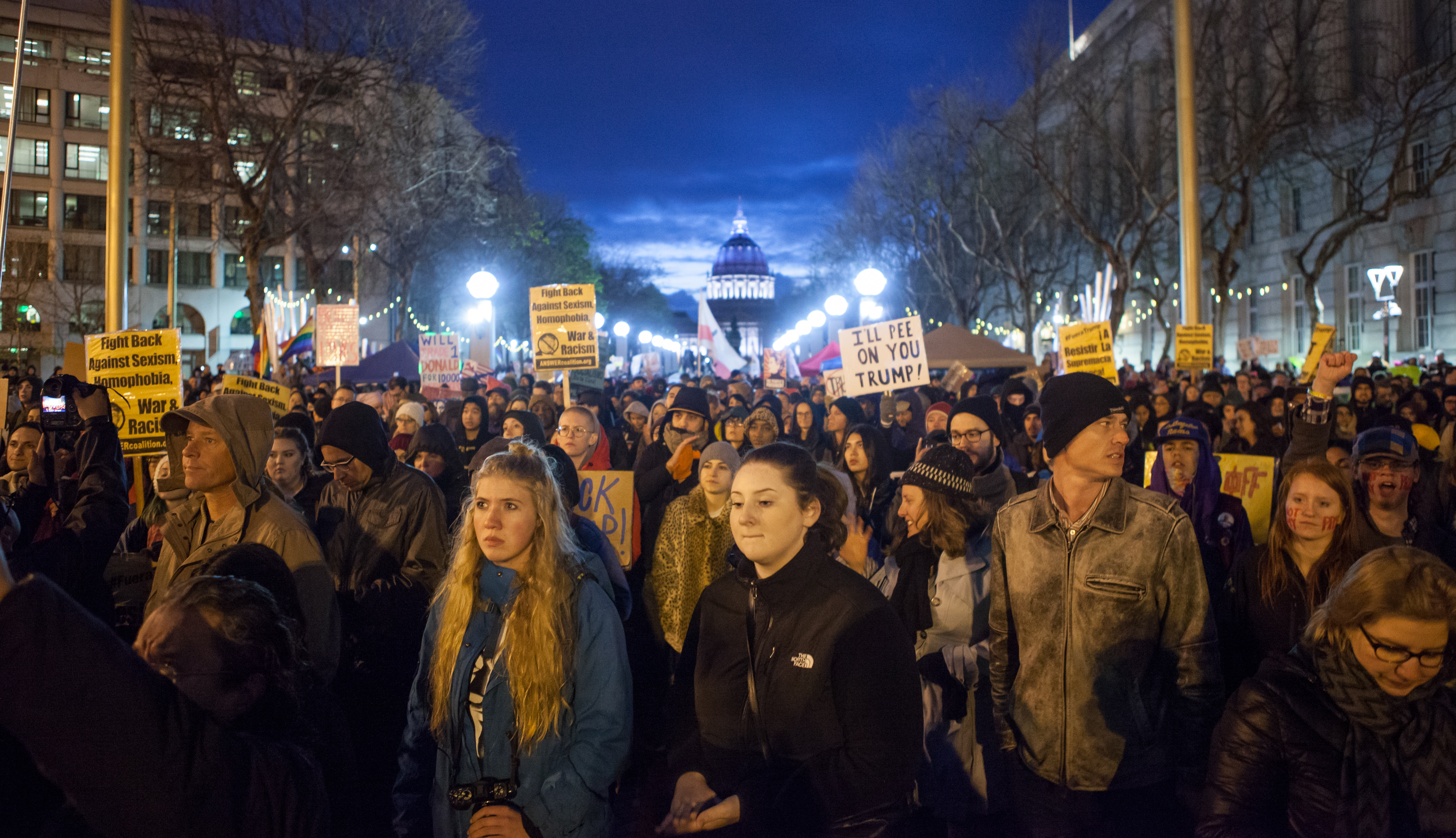
Trump inauguration protest SF Jan 20 2017 23

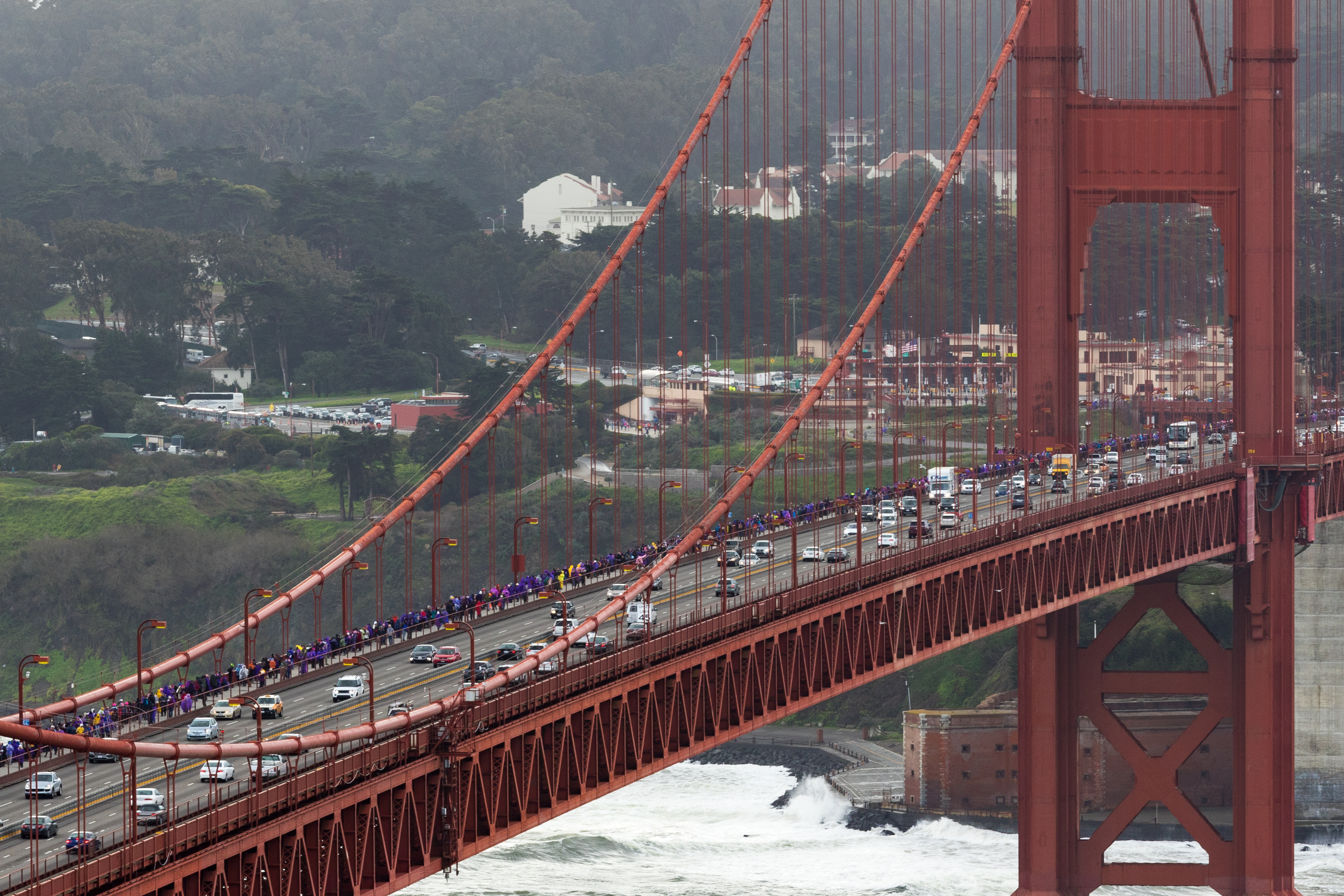
"Bridge Together Golden Gate"

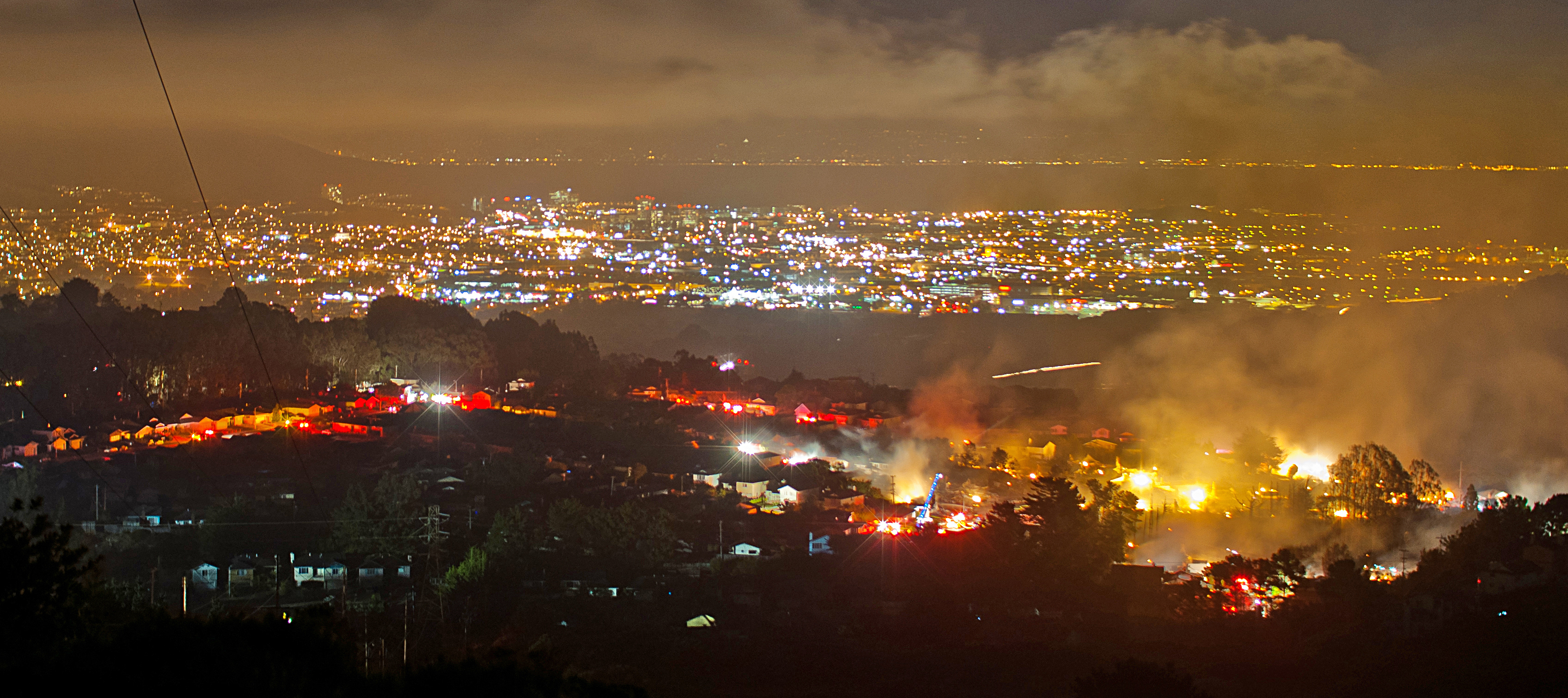
San Bruno explosion and fires, at night

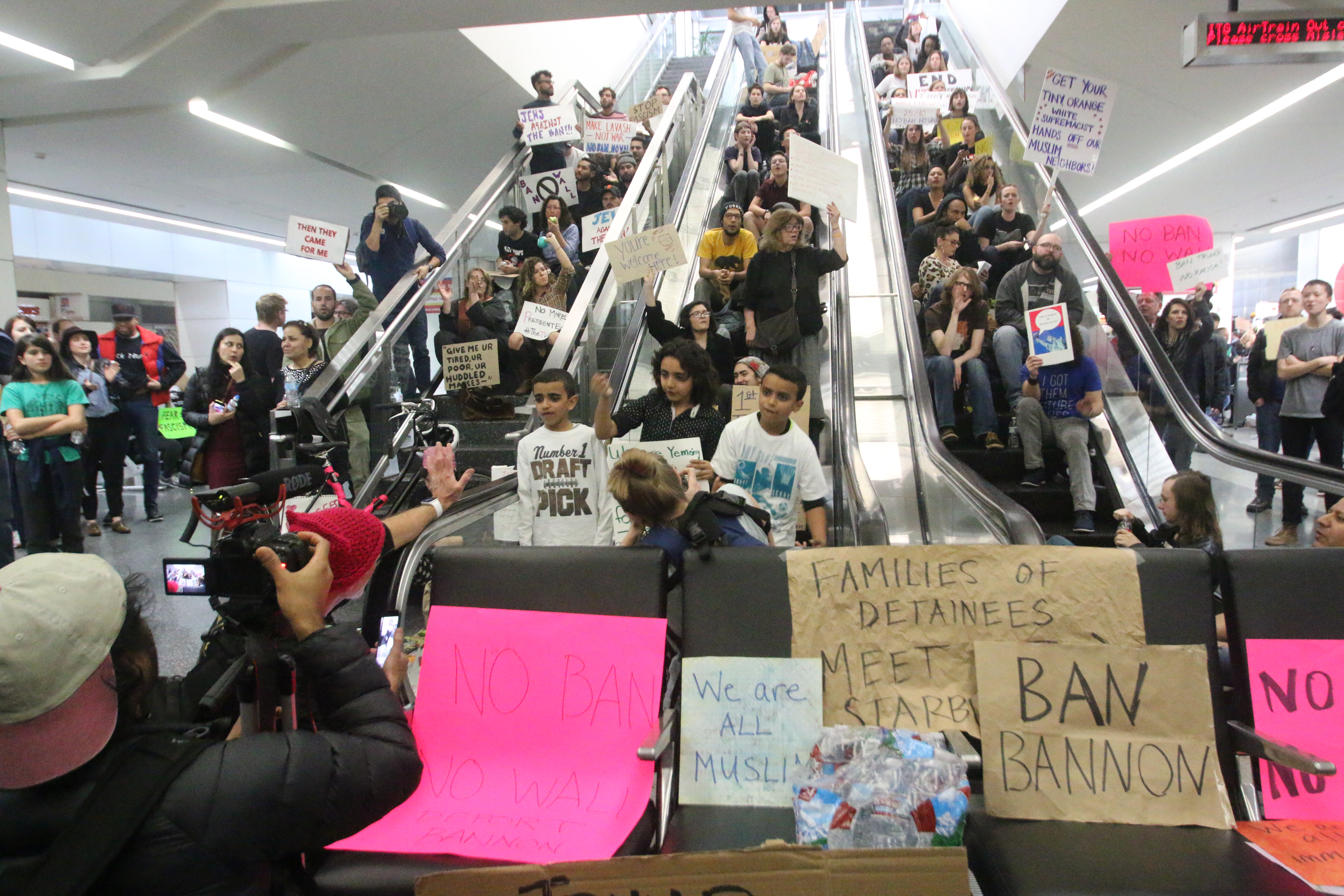
Protesters at San Francisco International Airport, 2017

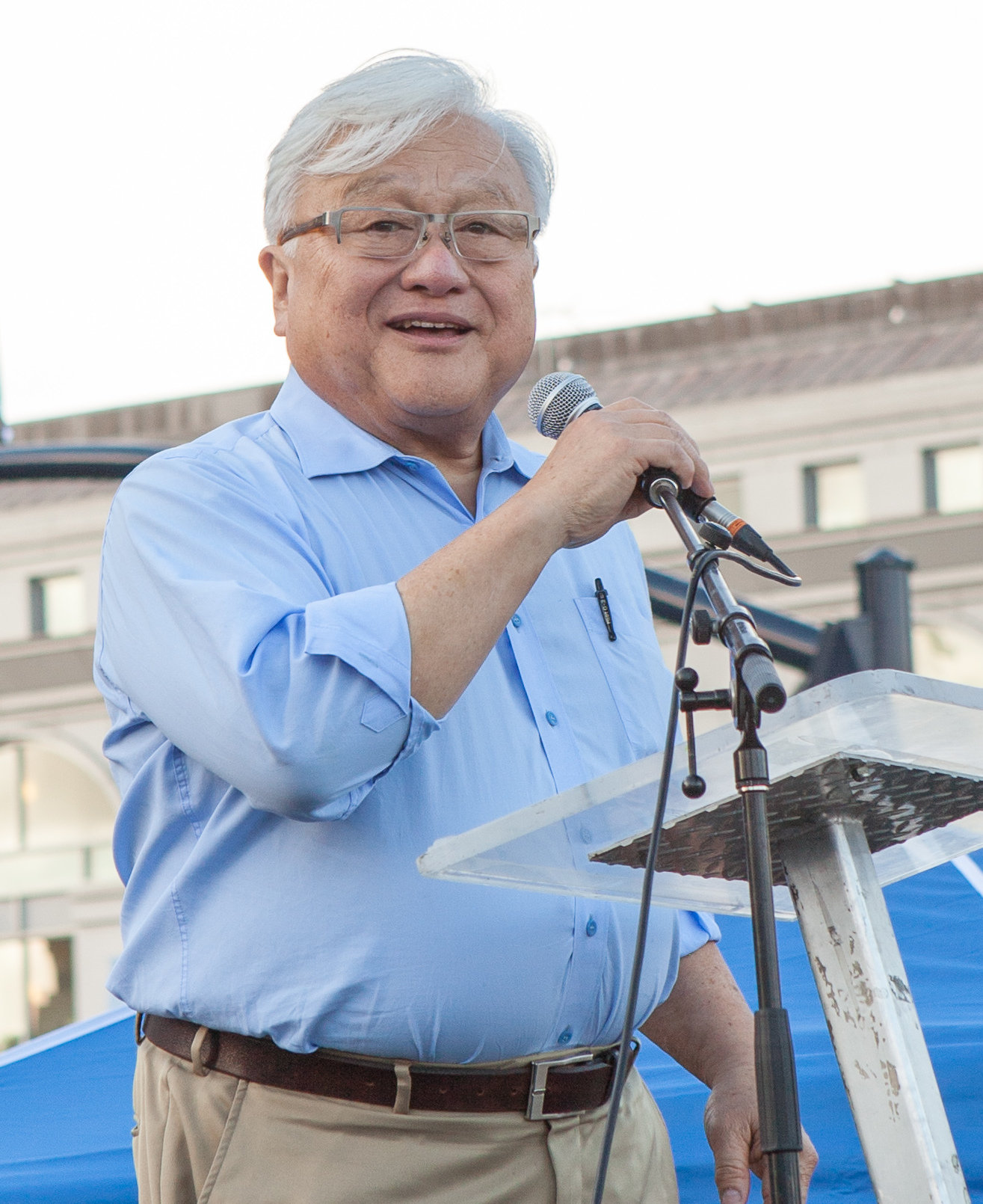
Representative Mike Honda speaks at a San Francisco protest of Executive_Order_13769 in February 2017

Series of Storms Battering California Tracked by NASA's AIRS Instrument

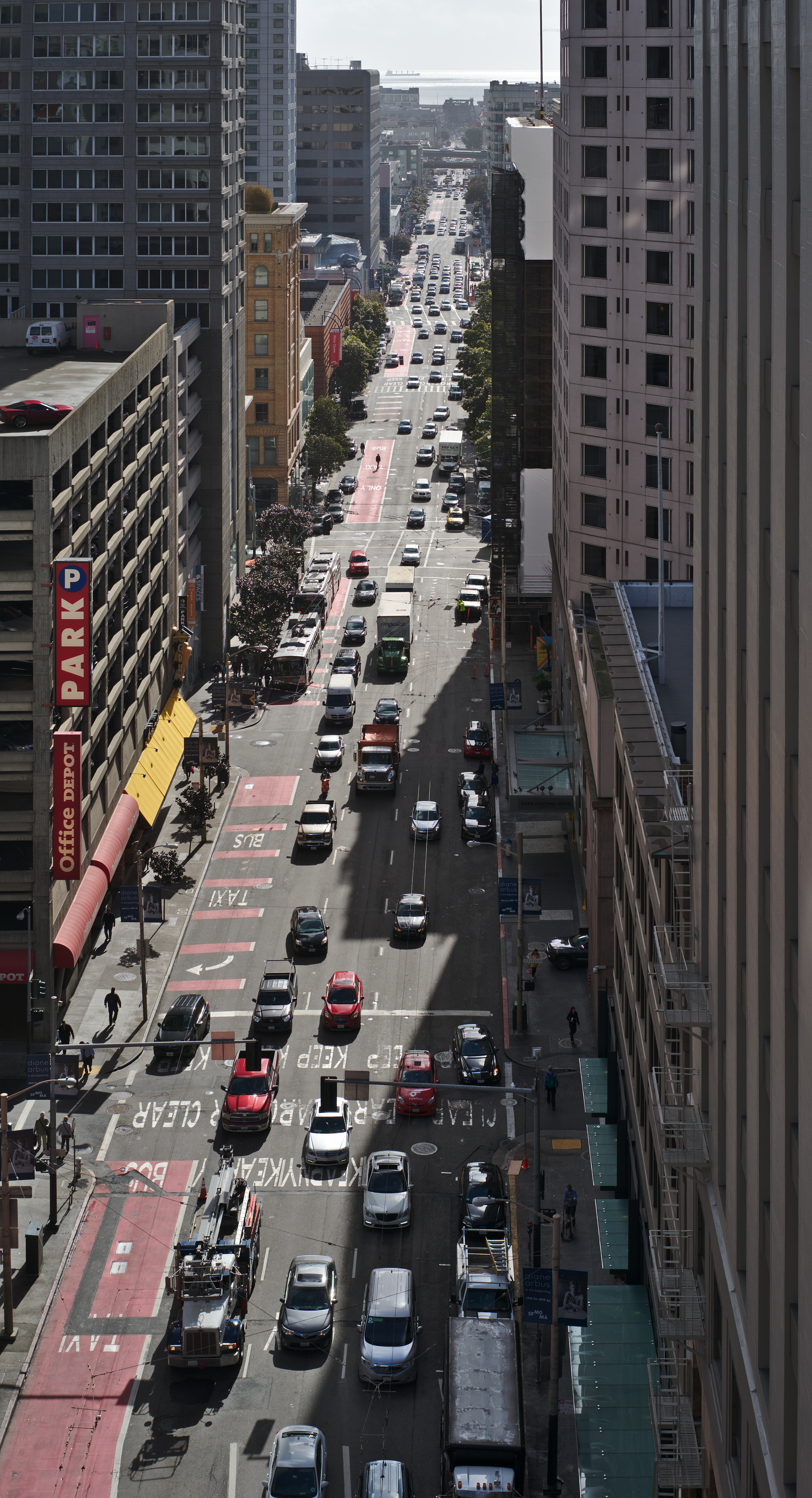
Third Street, San Francisco

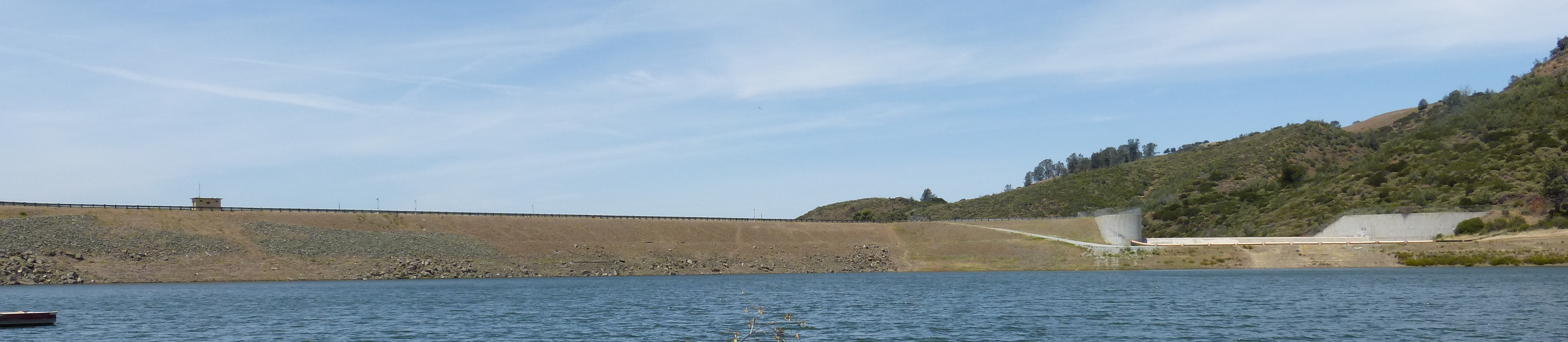
Anderson Lake dam and spillway

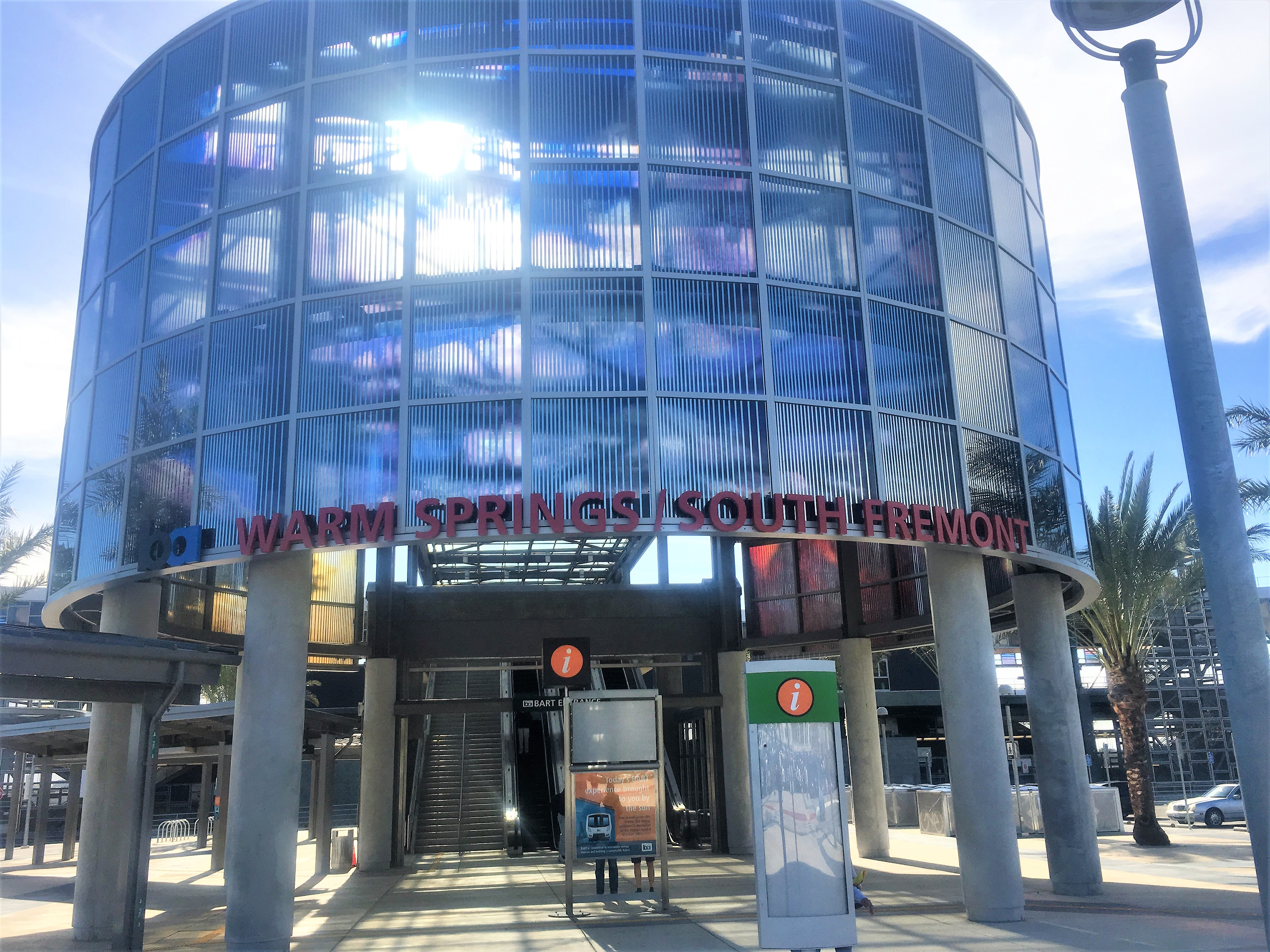
Warm Springs BART station on opening day

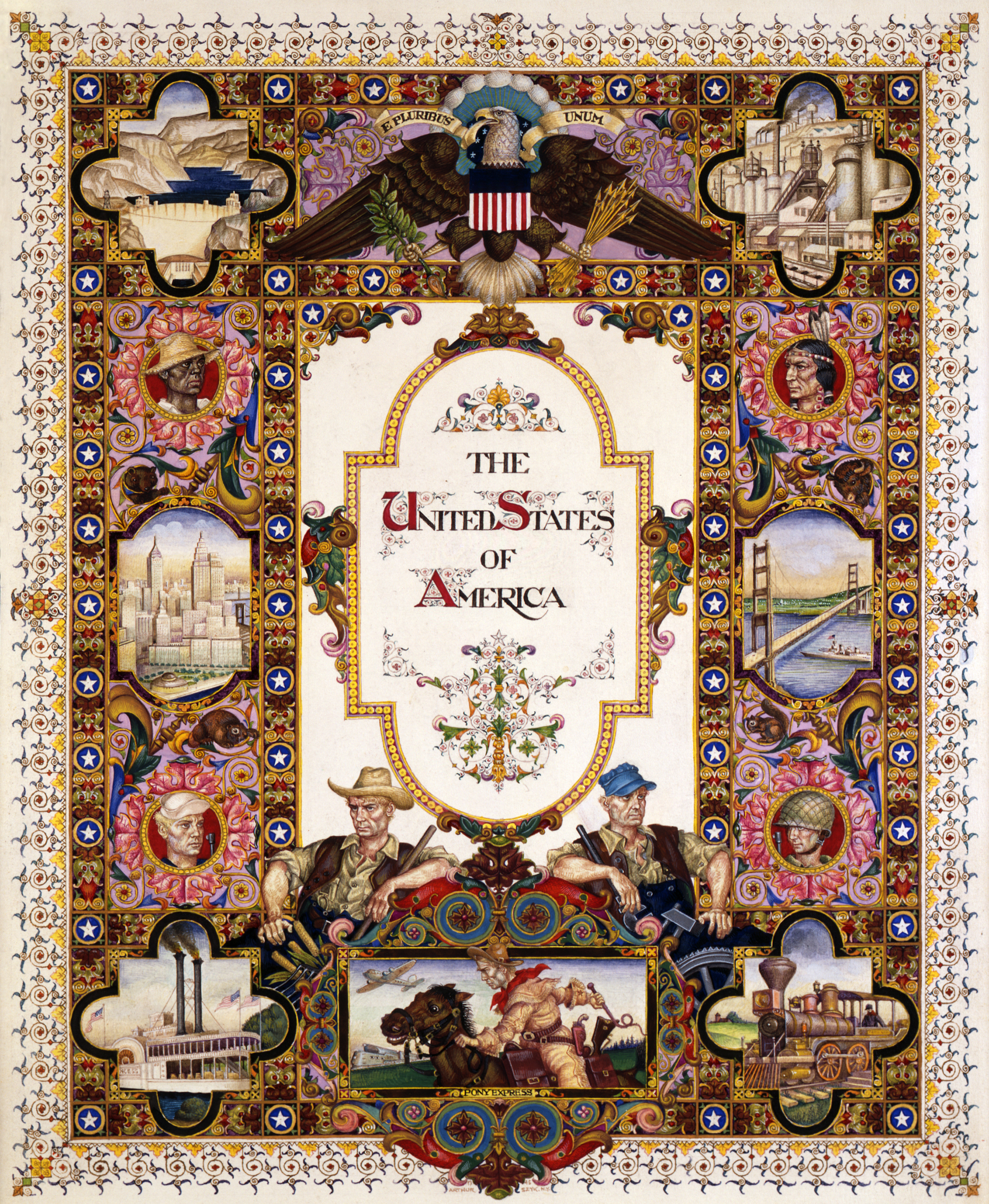
The United States of America, Arthur Szyk (1945)

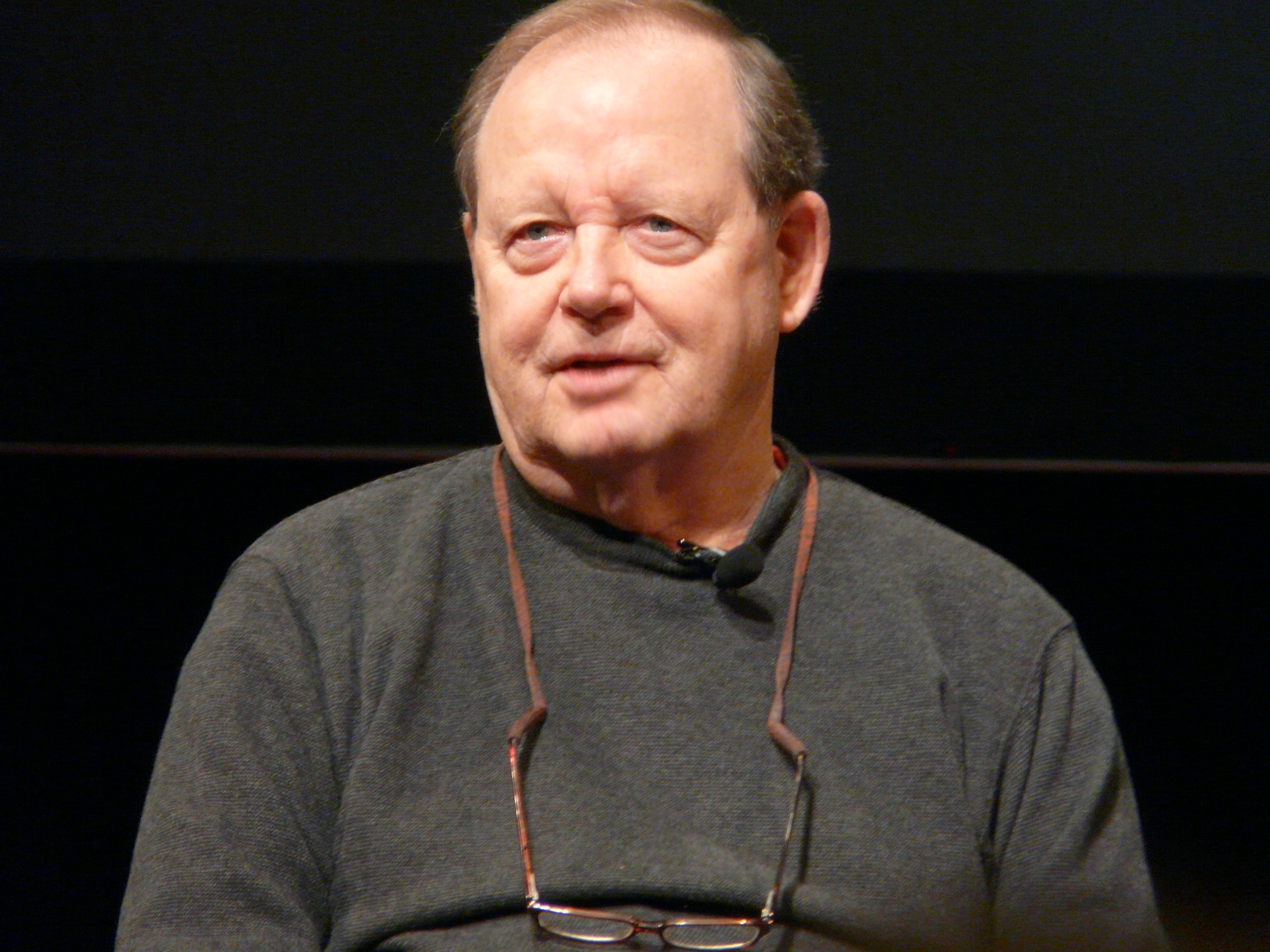
Robert Taylor in 2008

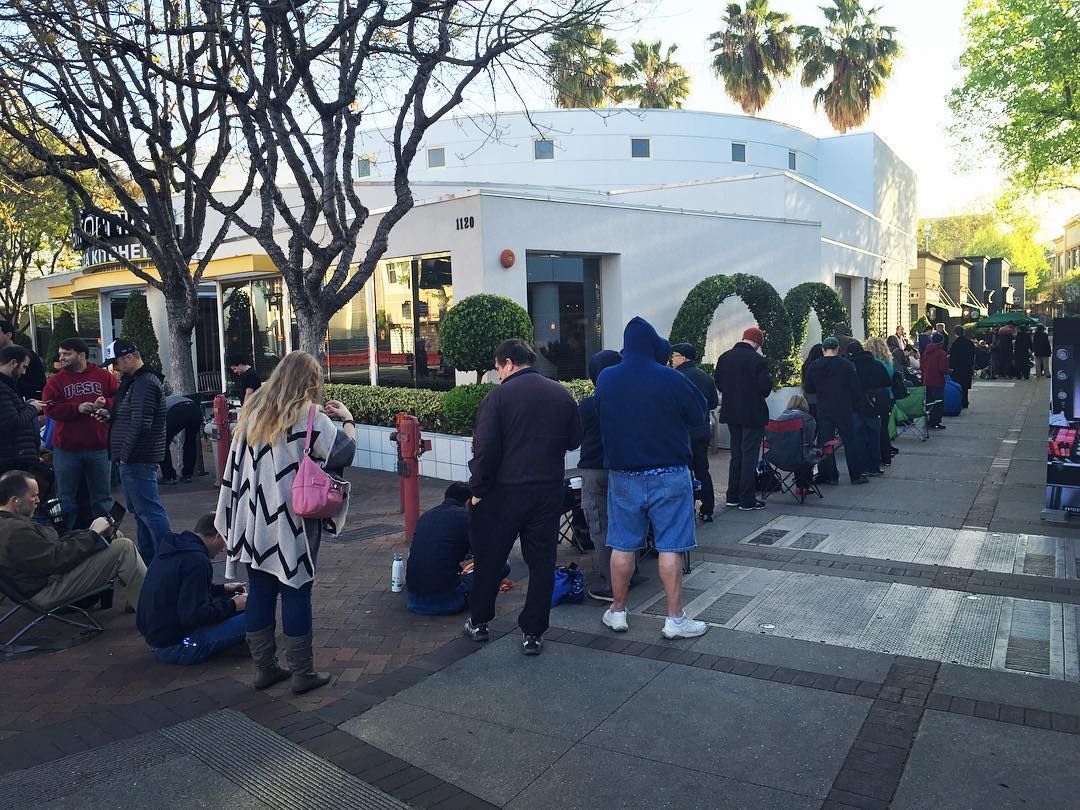
Customers waiting to purchase the Tesla 3 in Walnut Creek, California

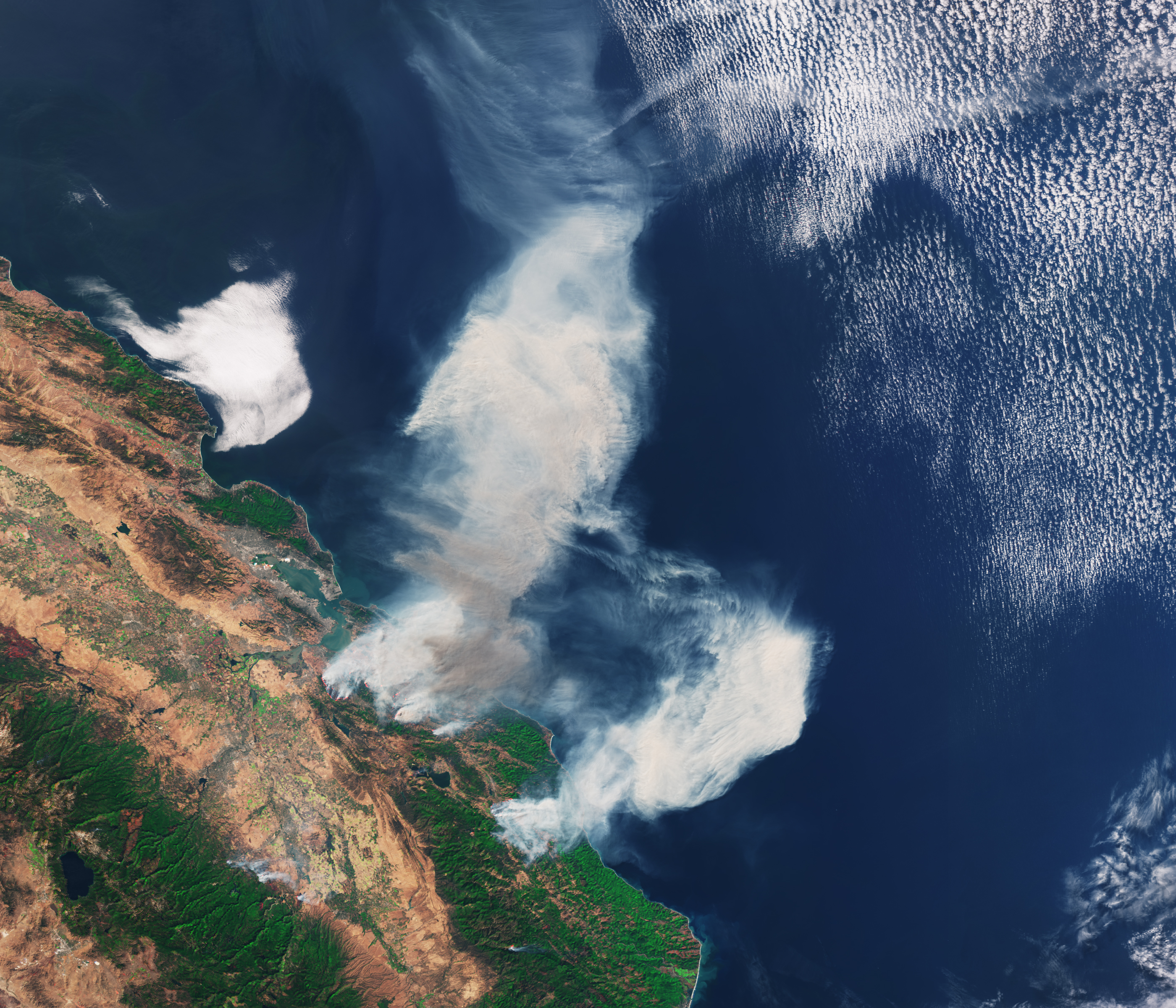
Satellite image of smoke from California wildfires

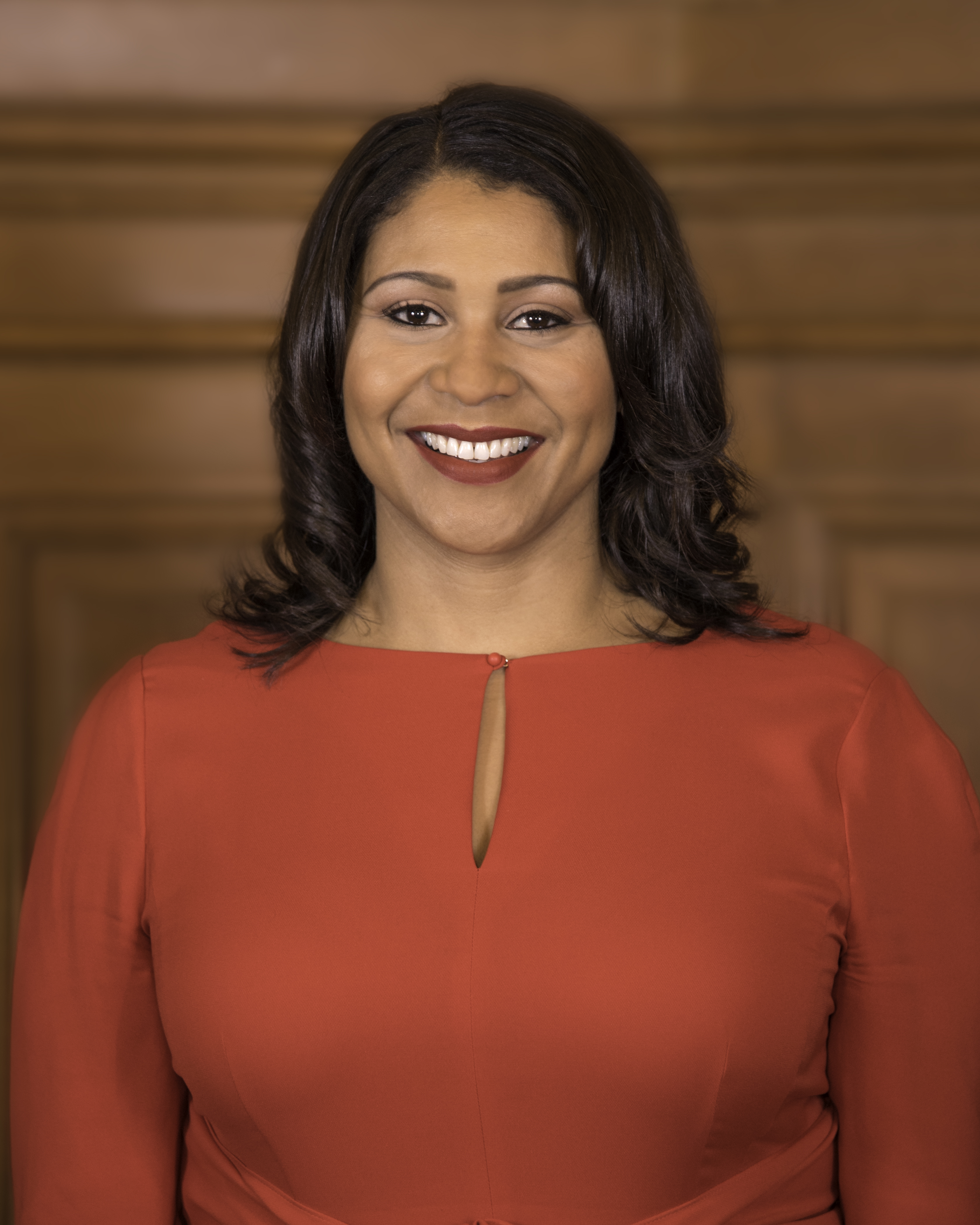
Acting San Francisco Mayor London Breed

- January
  - After a series of storms hit California, including January storms causing flooding on the Russian River, Northern California, including the Bay Area, is no longer in drought
  - The Land Trust of Napa County, with The Trust for Public Land, secures the largest conservation easement in its history, 7,260 acres northeast of Calistoga known as Montesol Ranch, near Mount St. Helena, and contiguous to Robert Louis Stevenson State Park
  - Kevin Starr (pictured), American historian and California's State Librarian, best known for his multi-volume series on the history of California, collectively called "Americans and the California Dream", dies in San Francisco, the home of his birth as a seventh-generation Californian
  - Protests of the presidential inauguration of Donald Trump occur in cities across the Bay Area (SF protest pictured), including local versions of the Women's March on Washington, a human chain along the span of the Golden Gate Bridge (pictured), and a 90% no show of dockworkers at the Port of Oakland
  - Due to severe storms, Governor Jerry Brown declares states of emergency in multiple counties, including all nine Bay Area counties: Alameda, Contra Costa, Marin, Napa, San Francisco, San Mateo, Santa Clara, Solano, and Sonoma counties
  - The cities of Oakland, San Francisco, San Jose, and Berkeley affirm their formal (for San Jose, informal) status as Sanctuary cities, after a Trump Administration executive order is issued that will require cities to cooperate with Immigration and Customs Enforcement orders, or face cuts to federal spending, more than $1 billion in the Bay Area alone
  - Pacific Gas and Electric is ordered by U.S. District Judge Thelton Henderson to publicly advertise its guilt in violating pipeline safety laws, and obstruction of justice, in the 2010 San Bruno explosion (fires that night pictured), pay $3 million in fines, and make its employees perform 10,000 hours of community service, including at least 2,000 hours by high-level officials
  - Google, Inc. recalls all staff travelling overseas who may be affected by President Trump's executive order suspending all entry of citizens from certain Middle Eastern nations, out of concern they may be barred from re-entry to the US
  - Protesters of the executive order suspending entry of certain foreign nationals are joined at San Francisco International Airport by Sergey Brin, Google co-founder and president of Alphabet, who states "I'm here because I'm a refugee", while the airport issues a statement in support of the protesters, saying "We share [[their]] concerns deeply, as our highest obligation is to the millions of people from around the world whom we serve. Although Customs and Border Protection services are strictly federal and operate outside the jurisdiction of all U.S. airports, including SFO, we have requested a full briefing from this agency to ensure our customers remain the top priority. We are also making supplies available to travelers affected by this Executive Order, as well as to the members of the public who have so bravely taken a stand against this action by speaking publicly in our facilities." (protesters pictured)
  - San Francisco becomes the first city to sue the Trump Administration over his executive order to deny federal funds to sanctuary cities, joining 2 states that have sued
- February
  - The University of California, Berkeley cancels a talk by inflammatory speaker and Breitbart writer Milo Yiannopoulos, and puts the campus on lockdown, due to massive protests, violence, property destruction and fire-setting
  - Berkeley mayor Jesse Arreguín receives thousands of hateful, racist, abusive and threatening messages, including death threats, following his criticism of Milo Yiannopoulos' attempted talk at UC Berkeley, initially describing him as a white nationalist, then apologizing and changing the description to "alt-rightist"
  - Thousands attend a protest at Civic Center, San Francisco to protest the immigration/travel ban on seven majority-Muslim nations (US Representative Mike Honda, pictured at event), one of a number of nationwide protests against the ban
  - In San Francisco, three judges on the 9th Circuit Court of Appeals unanimously reject the US Government argument that a stay of the executive order barring nationals from seven majority-Muslim nations should be lifted, stating that any argument limiting or dismissing the courts ability to serve as a check on Executive Branch power "runs contrary to the fundamental structure of our constitutional democracy"
  - Historically strong Pineapple Express storms bring flooding and mudslides to the Bay Area, destroying homes and closing numerous roads, including State Route 17, State Route 35, State Route 37, Interstate 80, State Route 12, State Route 1, State Route 84, State Route 9, and State Route 152 (storm systems pictured)
  - California Governor Jerry Brown requests a Presidential Major Disaster Declaration from President Donald Trump, following a series of storms that hit California, including the Bay Area
  - The Kunal Patel San Francisco Open has its first tournament, at the Bay Club SF Tennis Center, part of the ATP Challenger Tour
  - The United States Patent Office rules that the Broad Institute's patent claims on the CRISPR gene manipulation technology are valid for Eukaryotic cells (plants and animals), ruling against claims made by the University of California, Berkeley, and granting UC Berkeley a patent limited to its use on Prokaryotic cells (bacteria)
  - Thousands gather at Ocean Beach in San Francisco, to stand together in protest against Donald Trump and spell out the word "Resist !!", with overflow crowds creating an underline
  - A Day without Immigrants, modeled on the Great American Boycott of 2006, protesting the Trump Administration immigration policy, has businesses across the Bay Area closing in solidarity with the nationwide day of action
  - San Francisco is ranked third in traffic congestion of all major US cities, according to the traffic and driver analytics company INRIX (Third Street congestion pictured)
  - More than 200 residents are rescued by boat, in the Rocksprings neighborhood of San Jose, due to flooding at Coyote Creek from storm water released at Anderson Lake (dam and spillway pictured) Over 14,000 households are subject to mandatory evacuation due to widespread flooding that exceeds the 100-year flood zone
  - Richmond is the first city in the United States to pass a resolution calling on the United States Congress to investigate, and if necessary, impeach, President Donald Trump, for violating the Foreign Emoluments Clause of the United States Constitution in his international business relations
  - Santa Clara County is the first county in the nation to file a motion requesting that a Federal judge halt implementation of the Trump Administration's executive order withholding federal funding for sanctuary cities
  - The Jewish Anti-Defamation League offices in San Francisco receive two consecutive bomb threats, as do other Bay Area Jewish community centers, part of a widespread wave of over 100 threats and criminal actions directed against the US Jewish community in 2017
- March
  - House Minority Leader Nancy Pelosi, from California's 12th congressional district in San Francisco, and other senior Democratic congressional leaders, call on United States Attorney General Jeff Sessions to resign, following reports that he had lied under oath to Congress about phone contacts he had had with Russian officials prior to taking his post, and during the presidential campaign of Donald Trump, for who he campaigned
  - Violence at a Berkeley March 4 Trump rally results in injuries to 7, and the arrests of 10 people
  - The Warm Springs / South Fremont Bay Area Rapid Transit station (pictured) begins operating in Fremont
  - Berkeley is the first city in the US to declare they will refuse to conduct business with companies that are involved with the US/Mexico border wall proposed by President Trump, and will move to divest from those companies that they have investments in
  - The National Football League approves the Oakland Raiders move from Oakland to Las Vegas, Nevada, once a new stadium is constructed there, despite efforts by Oakland Mayor Libby Schaaf to create financing for a new stadium complex in Oakland
- April
  - A collection of the works of Arthur Szyk (work pictured), consisting of 450 paintings, drawings and sketches owned by Burlingame Rabbi Irvin Ungar, is purchased for $10.1 million by the University of California, Berkeley's Magnes Collection of Jewish Art and Life, through a donation by Taube Philanthropies, the largest single monetary gift to acquire art in UC Berkeley history
  - Santa Clara County and San Francisco ask U.S. District Judge William Orrick to block an executive order by President Donald Trump that threatens to deny federal funding to sanctuary cities and counties, arguing that it violates the Constitution and federal laws
  - Suicide barriers begin to be installed under the Golden Gate Bridge after years of debate and delays.
  - At least 21 people are arrested, and 7 hospitalized, at a clash between approximately 200 Pro-Trump and Anti-Trump demonstrators in Berkeley, at Martin Luther King Jr. Civic Center Park, during which numerous fights broke out, with reports of the use of firecrackers and pepper spray
  - Computer scientist Robert W. Taylor (pictured), who was integral in the development of the Internet, and who founded the Digital Equipment Corporation Systems Research Center in Palo Alto, dies at his home in Woodside
  - Women's clothing retailer Bebe begins closing all 175 of its stores, to become an exclusively online retailer
  - The area's first officially sanctioned "Weed Day" takes place in San Francisco's Golden Gate Park
  - Tens of thousands turn out in San Francisco on Earth Day at the local March for Science, to protest federal budget cuts to science research, with MythBusters host Adam Savage saying "The enemy of science isn't politics or a party or an ideology or a law — it is bias, and bias is everywhere. Science is the rigorous elimination of bias. That is a good thing."
  - In response to requests by Santa Clara County and San Francisco, U.S. District Judge William Orrick temporarily blocks Executive Order 13768, which had threatened to deny federal funding to sanctuary cities, writing "The statements of the President, his press secretary and the Attorney General belie the Government's argument in the briefing that the Order does not change the law. They have repeatedly indicated an intent to defund sanctuary jurisdictions in compliance with the Executive Order."..."The threat of the Order and the uncertainty it is causing impermissibly interferes with the Counties' ability to operate, to provide key services, to plan for the future, and to budget."
- May
  - At least 80 leopard sharks wash up dead on the shores of San Francisco Bay, possibly due to a fungal infection, with likely as many as 1,000 dying and sinking since early March
- June
  - The Golden State Warriors become NBA champions over the Cleveland Cavaliers, with Kevin Durant earning the Bill Russell M.V.P. Award, with coach Steve Kerr joking, "We have very little talent, actually, it was most coaching"
  - A gunman kills 3 people at a San Francisco UPS facility before killing himself
- July
  - The Tesla Model 3 electric car begins production at the Fremont Tesla Factory (customers pictured)
  - Air Canada Flight 759 narrowly misses a runway incursion at San Francisco International Airport that one retired pilot called "close to the greatest aviation disaster in history".
- August
  - Bay Area rapper Keak Da Sneak is shot and critically injured in Richmond, in a targeted attack
  - The Consulate-General of Russia in San Francisco is ordered to close by the Trump Administration, in retaliation to Russia ordering staff reductions at the US Embassies there
- September
  - San Francisco reaches a daytime temperature of 106 degrees Fahrenheit, its highest recorded temperature since record keeping began in 1874.
  - Hiking and mountain bike trails open to the peak of Mount Umunhum in San Mateo County, a spur of the Bay Area Ridge Trail
- October
  - Fourteen large wildfires, including the Atlas and Tubbs Fires, spread over a 200-mile region north of San Francisco, in Napa, Sonoma and Yuba counties, kill at least 10 people and destroy over 1,500 structures (smoke from fires pictured)
- November
  - A rare mountain lion spotted in San Francisco is tranquilized and released into the wild, far south of the city
  - The La Honda Creek Open Space Preserve, a 6,142-acre open space reserve in San Mateo County, California, part of the Midpeninsula Regional Open Space District, opens to the public
  - Jose Ines Garcia Zarate, an undocumented immigrant, is found not guilty of murder for the 2015 shooting of Kathryn Steinle on a San Francisco pier, in a case that had touched off a national immigration debate. San Francisco pier shooting jury ends Day 5 without verdict - The Washington Post
- December
  - A data breach at Stanford University reveals that the university secretly ranked fellowship applicants on their potential value to the university, rather than the university's publicly stated method of by need
  - Silicon Valley software engineer Susan Fowler and San Francisco lobbyist Adama Iwu are featured, with other women, on the cover of Time's 2017 Person of the Year issue, this year given to "The Silence Breakers", people who spoke out against sexual abuse and harassment
  - San Francisco Mayor Ed Lee, the city's first Asian-American mayor, dies from a heart attack, with San Francisco Board of Supervisors president London Breed (pictured) sworn in as acting mayor
  - Senator Dianne Feinstein formally asks Immigration and Customs Enforcement to investigate the West County Detention Center, where multiple federal detainees have stated that they were not allowed to use restrooms. Feinstein wrote, "It has been reported that the conditions are so deplorable that detainees are requesting deportation over pursuing claims in immigration court"
  - Buddy's Cannabis Shop, in San Jose, is the first California business to obtain a state Marijuana Micro-Business License, which, along with a city business license, will make it the first fully licensed recreational marijuana shop in California, when it becomes legal on 1 January 2018
  - Everitt Aaron Jameson, a 25-year-old former marine, is arrested by the FBI on suspicion of planning a terror attack in the Pier 39 area of San Francisco over Christmas.
2018

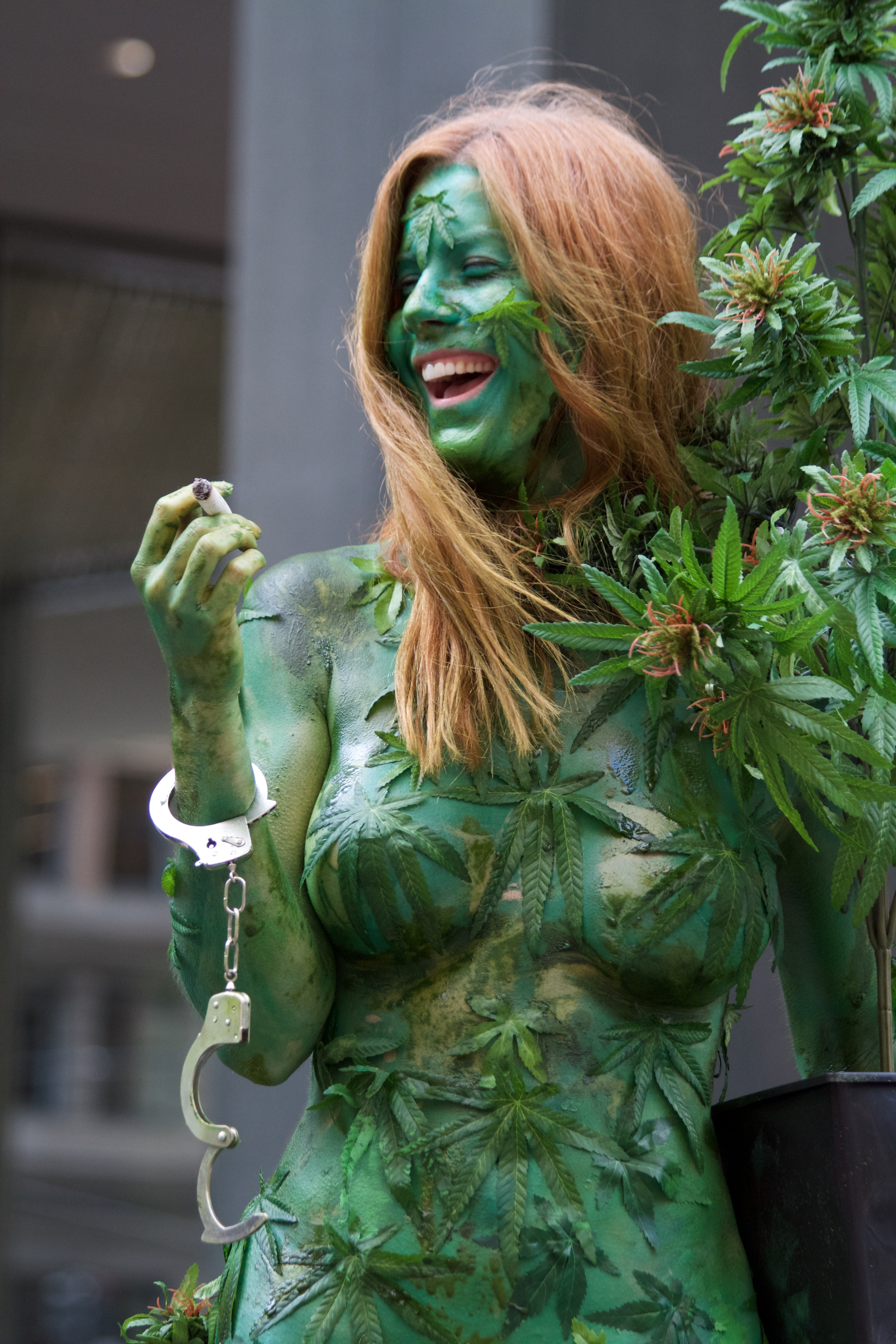
Performance art, 2016, San Francisco

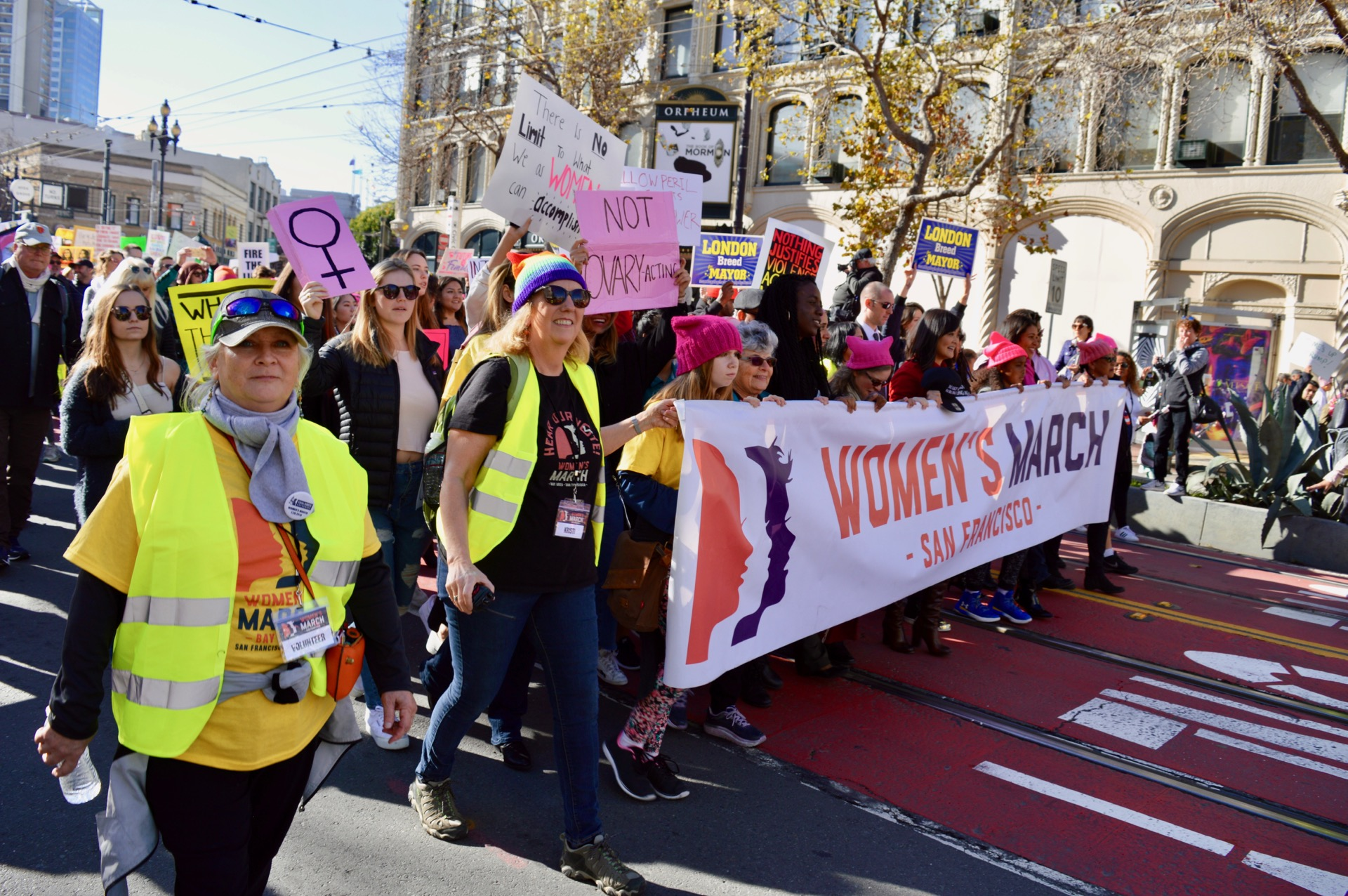
Women's March, 2018

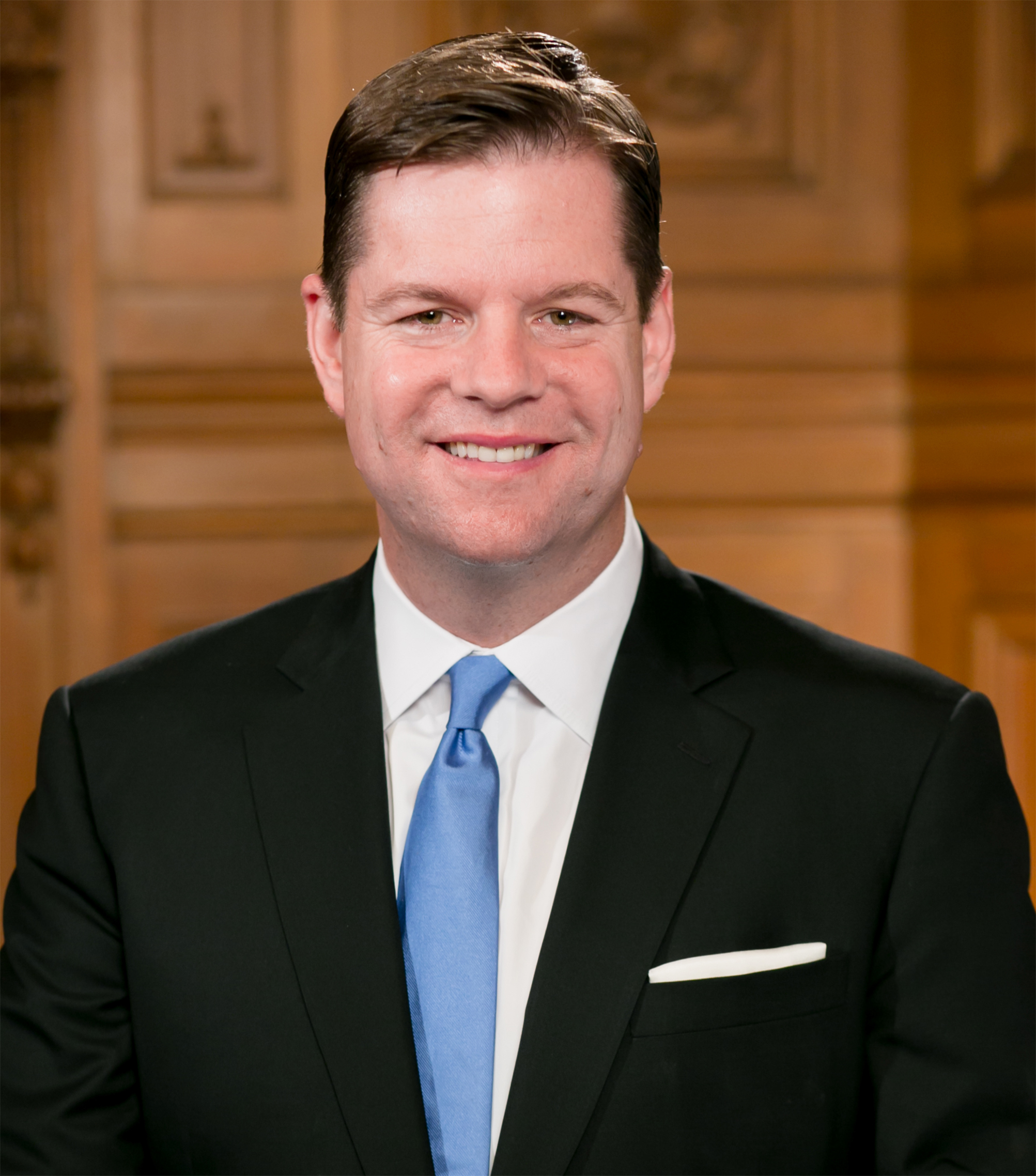
San Francisco interim Mayor Mark Farrell

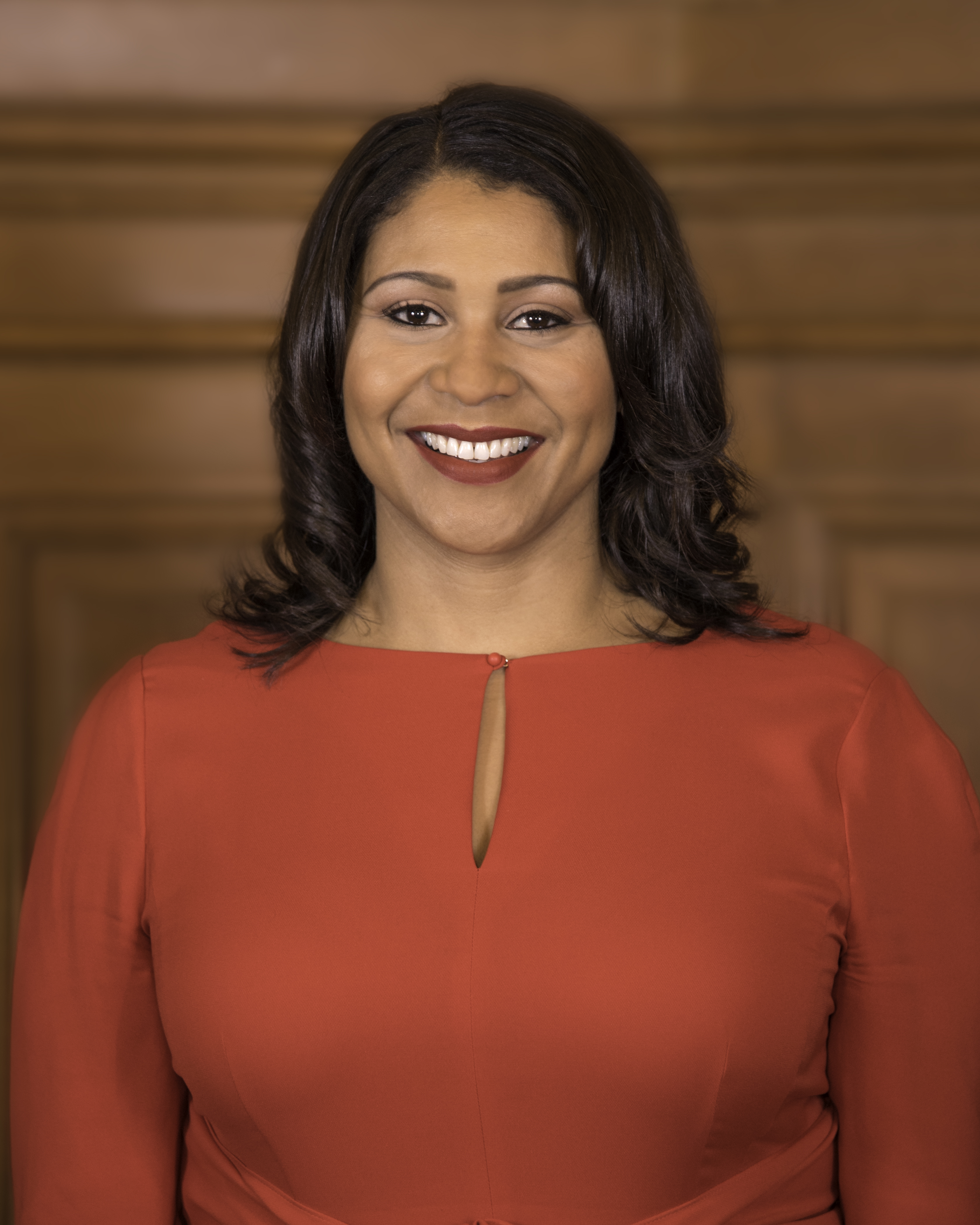
London Breed

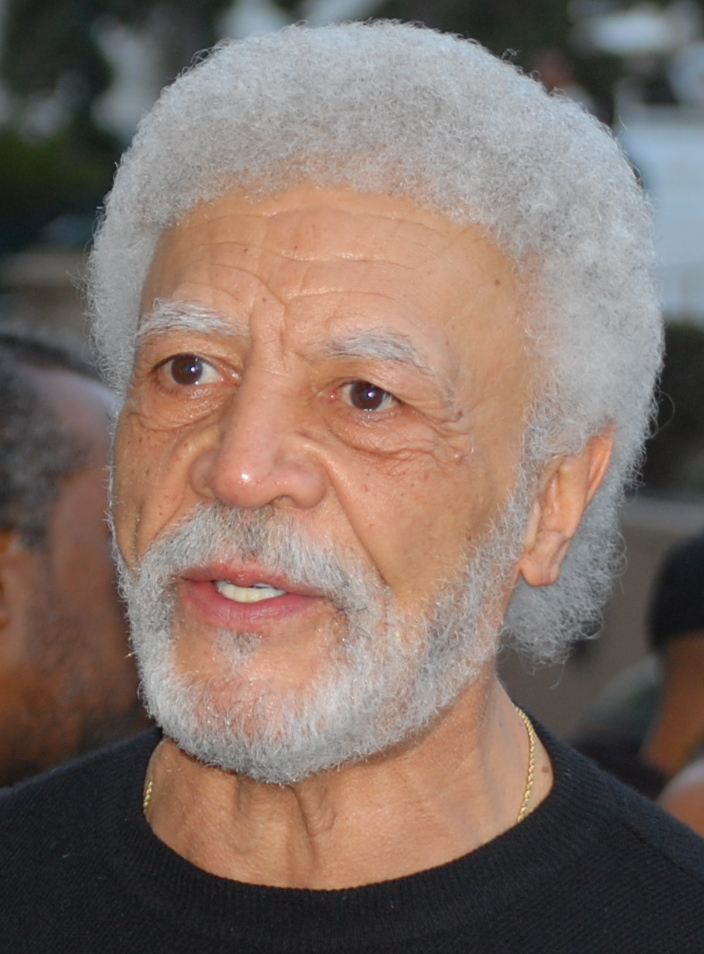
Ron Dellums

- January
  - Starting January 1, with the Adult Use of Marijuana Act going into effect statewide, Harborside Health Center, Berkeley Patients Group, and many other Marijuana dispensaries in the Bay Area begin retail sales of Marijuana to the general public (public performer on 2016 Independence Day pictured)
  - Parks in the Golden Gate National Recreation Area, including Muir Woods National Monument and Fort Point National Historic Site, experience partial or total closure, due to the January 2018 United States federal government shutdown
  - More than 150,000 people attend 2018 Women's March protests across the Bay Area, adding the #MeToo and #TimesUp movements to the protests against President Donald Trump (San Francisco event pictured) Bay Area women take to the streets in second annual march
  - The San Francisco Board of Supervisors votes to replace acting mayor London Breed with an interim mayor, former supervisor Mark Farrell (pictured), amid accusations of racism Political Uproar as Mark Farrell Replaces London Breed as S.F. Mayor
  - San Jose mayor Sam Liccardo resigns from the Federal Communications Commission Broadband Advisory Board, citing undue influence from telecommunications companies San Jose Mayor Sam Liccardo quits FCC broadband advisory board
  - San Francisco District Attorney George Gascón announces his department will begin to retroactively apply Proposition 64, the Adult Use of Marijuana Act, which legalized the possession and recreational use of marijuana for adults ages 21 years or older, to misdemeanor and felony convictions dating back to 1975, recalling and re-sentencing up to 4,940 felony marijuana convictions and dismissing and sealing 3,038 misdemeanors
- February
  - The Berkeley City Council declares Berkeley a "sanctuary city" for recreational cannabis sales, prohibiting the use of city resources to assist in enforcing federal marijuana laws or providing information on legal cannabis sales, the first city in California to do so
  - Marin County is ranked worst among all California counties in racial disparity, according to Race Counts and Advancement Project California, with a spokesperson for the groups stating, "We were surprised, and were not expecting Marin to be the number-one county in terms of disparity...It's not that progressive counties have it all figured out"
  - Alameda County District Attorney Nancy O'Malley announces that her office will review thousands of marijuana convictions, dating back to 1974, for possible dismissal under Proposition 64, the Adult Use of Marijuana Act, guidelines, following closely after San Francisco announced a similar plan (above)
  - Oakland Mayor Libby Schaaf alerts city residents to imminent Immigration and Customs Enforcement (ICE) raids, earning criticism from some federal authorities. She responds, "I was sharing information in a way that was legal and was not obstructing justice, and it was an opportunity to ensure that people were aware of their rights."
- March
  - A man with a rifle enters the Veterans Home of California Yountville, the largest veterans home in the United States, holds employees hostage, and is found dead, along with 3 hostages
- May
  - Two studies conclude that the housing crisis in the Bay Area and California is reaching emergency proportions, with one study estimating that two counties alone, Santa Clara and Alameda, will need more than 50,000 new homes to meet the demand for affordable housing for lower-income residents, while homelessness increased by 36% in Alameda County from 2016-2017
  - The father of some of the ten children that were removed from a home in Fairfield, where they were living in conditions of severe neglect and abuse, is arrested and booked on seven counts of torture and nine counts of felony child abuse
  - A nine-story electronic sculpture, "Day for Night", created by artist Jim Campbell, that features low resolution, abstract videos of San Francisco, debuts at the top of Salesforce Tower
- June
  - San Francisco voters pass an ordinance banning the sale of flavored tobacco products, due in part to concerns that candy-flavored products may lure teenagers into nicotine addiction
  - Santa Clara County voters remove Santa Clara County Superior Court judge Aaron Persky, who came to national attention in 2016 when he sentenced a Stanford University student to just six months in jail for sexually assaulting an unconscious woman
  - London Breed (pictured) is elected Mayor of San Francisco in a special election, defeating close rival Mark Leno
  - Theranos founder and CEO Elizabeth Holmes, and former president and COO Ramesh Balwani are indicted on charges of wire fraud, accused of carrying out a multi-million dollar scheme to defraud investors, doctors and patients. Theranos announced that Holmes would resign as CEO, but retain her position as chairwoman of the board
  - Hanabiko "Koko", a female western lowland gorilla born at the San Francisco Zoo, who was known for having learned a large number of hand signs from a modified version of American Sign Language. dies at her home in Woodside, California
- July
  - The West County Detention Center severs ties with Immigration and Customs Enforcement, and will no longer incarcerate undocumented migrants at the Contra Costa County facility.
  - Nia Wilson, an African American woman, is killed while exiting MacArthur BART station, when a white male attacked her and one of her two sisters with her, with strong suspicions that this was a racially motivated hate crime
  - Ron Dellums (pictured), former East Bay US Representative and mayor of Oakland, known for his fiery anti-Vietnam War oratory and progressive politics, dies at his home in Washington, D.C.
- August
  - Apple Inc becomes the first company in history to reach $1,000,000,000,000 in value
  - The Salesforce Transit Center opens in San Francisco, initially as a hub for bus lines including MUNI and AC Transit, and eventually nearly a dozen other transit agencies, including BART and Caltrain
  - A study by the California Association of Realtors shows that only about 1 in 5 Bay Area residents can afford the median purchase price for a home, with state home affordability rates at a 10 year low
  - A jury in San Francisco awards 46-year-old former school groundskeeper Dewayne Johnson US$289m in damages against Monsanto, after alleging that it had spent decades hiding the cancer-causing dangers of its Roundup herbicides.
- September
  - The US Court of Appeals for the Federal Circuit upholds a patent filed by the Broad Institute of the Massachusetts Institute of Technology and Harvard University involving Crispr Cas-9 gene-editing, ruling that the patent didn't infringe on another patent filed two years prior by the University of California, Berkeley, where the technique was first developed
  - The Global Climate Action Summit convenes in San Francisco, hosted by California governor Jerry Brown, who pledges to uphold state environmental guidelines despite moves by the United States to roll them back
  - San Francisco businessman and co-founder of Salesforce.com, Marc Benioff, and his wife, Lynn Benioff, purchase Time magazine for $190 million Time Magazine Sold to Salesforce Founder Marc Benioff for $190 Million
  - Psychologist and Palo Alto University statistics professor Christine Blasey Ford accuses Supreme Court nominee Brett Kavanaugh of sexually assaulting her in 1982
2019
- January
  - Pacific Gas and Electric Company files for Chapter 11 bankruptcy for its recent roles in the California wildfires.
- February
  - Oakland teachers go on strike.
  - Elected San Francisco Public Defender Jeff Adachi dies at the age of 59.
  - Rainstorms cause the Russian River to flood, engulfing the town of Guerneville in the highest floodwaters in 25 years
- March
  - California governor Gavin Newsom declares a moratorium on the death penalty in California, and orders the gas chamber at San Quentin State Prison, the state's only site for the administration of capital punishment, to be dismantled and closed
- April
  - East Bay congressperson Eric Swalwell announces his candidacy for President of the United States in the 2020 election
  - A Google, Inc offshoot company, Wing, becomes the first drone delivery service to receive Air Carrier Certification from the Federal Aviation Administration (FAA).
- June
  - Oakland becomes the second city in the United States to decriminalize some entheogens, including "Magic Mushrooms"
2020
- March
  - During the week of March 16, in response to the COVID-19 pandemic in the United States across San Francisco Bay Area, all 9 Bay Area counties issued directives for residents to shelter-in-place until at least April 7.
- May
  - George Floyd protests in the San Francisco Bay Area begin.
2021
- May
  - On May 26, 2021, a mass shooting occurred at a Santa Clara Valley Transportation Authority (VTA) rail yard in San Jose. Ten people were killed during the shooting, including the gunman, a VTA employee who then committed suicide. It is the deadliest mass shooting in the Bay Area's history.
2022
2023
2024

== See also ==
- Bibliography of California history

=== Cities in California ===
- Timeline of Fresno, California
- Timeline of Los Angeles
- Timeline of Mountain View, California
- Timeline of Oakland, California
- Timeline of Riverside, California
- Timeline of Sacramento, California
- Timeline of San Bernardino, California
- Timeline of San Diego
- Timeline of San Francisco
- Timeline of San Jose, California
