= Nike Missile Site SF-88L =

Air defense missile site in California, US

Nike missile site SF-88L
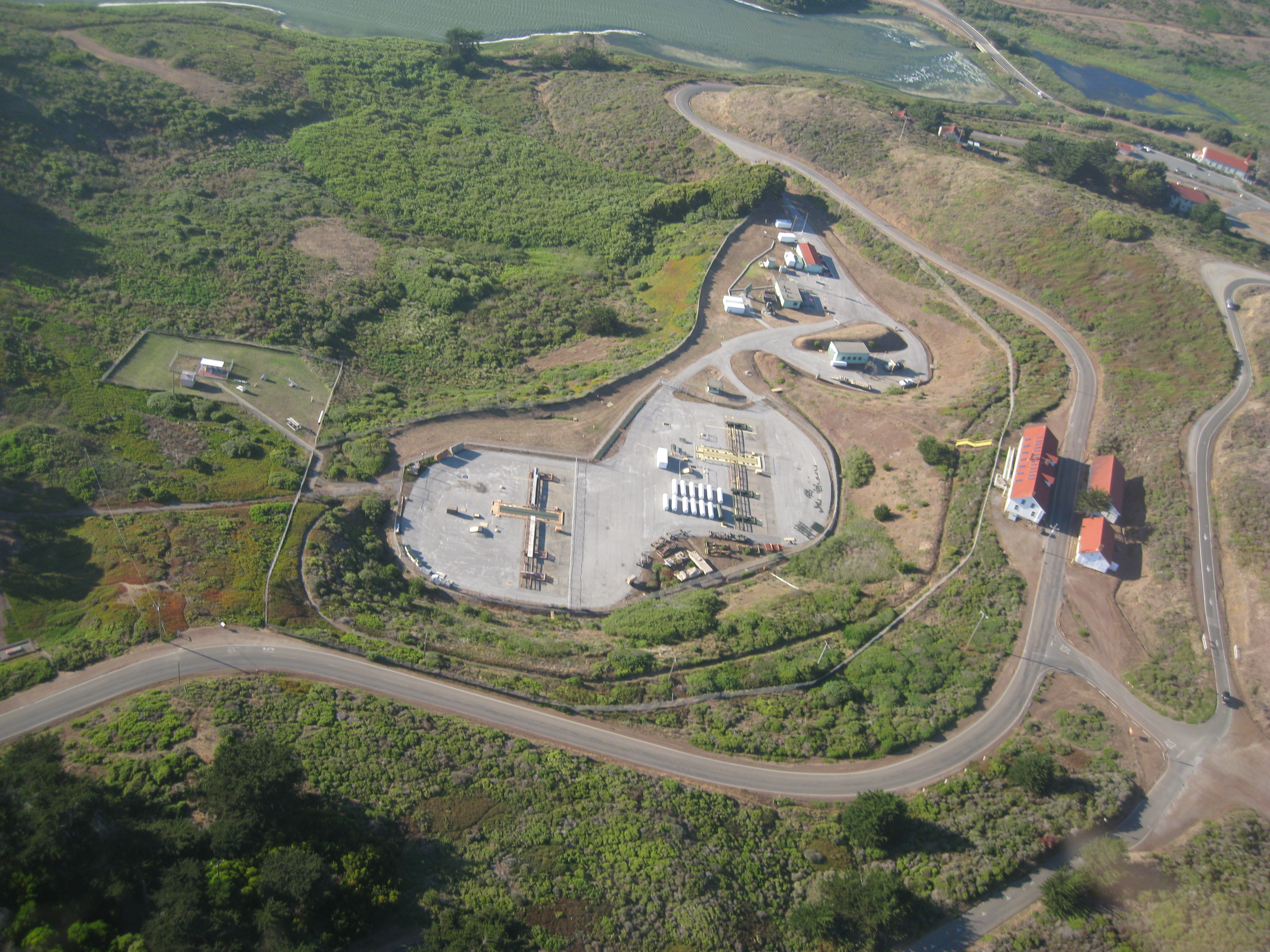
- Aerial view of SF-88L, facing north

- Location within San Francisco Bay Area
- Coordinates: 37°49′37″N 122°31′40″W
- Public transit access: Line 76X
- Website: www.nps.gov/goga/nike-missile-site.htm

SF-88L is a former Nike Missile launch site at Fort Barry, in the Marin Headlands to the north of San Francisco, California, United States. Opened in 1954, the site was intended to protect the population and military installations of the San Francisco Bay Area during the Cold War, specifically from attack by Soviet bomber aircraft.

The site was originally armed with Nike Ajax missiles, and modifications were made to the site in 1958 to allow it to also be armed with Nike Hercules missiles. In 1974, SF-88L was closed but was not demolished. It is now part of the Golden Gate National Recreation Area and is open to visitors. Visiting day is the first Saturday of each month, 12:30 - 3:30 PM, with formal tours occurring every 45 minutes. A special open house day with Nike veterans occurs on the first Saturday of each month. Restoration work to the site is done on remaining Saturdays by volunteers.

SF-88C, the integrated fire control area west on Wolf Ridge, was also closed in 1974. It was not restored and has been partially deconstructed. It is not a part of any tours or open visits.

== History ==
Construction of SF-88 was already under way by July 7, 1954, when the San Francisco Chronicle reported that four Nike launching sites were being built in the area: near Lake Chabot (SF-31) and at Forts Baker (SF-89), Barry (SF-88), and Cronkhite (SF-87). Captain Henry Paine assumed command of Battery A of the newly renamed 9th Antiaircraft Artillery Guided Missile Battalion of the 30th Antiaircraft Artillery Group on October 1, 1954, and the first temporary emplacements were ready for service by October 28, 1954. The Nike-Ajax missiles were removed and replaced with Nike-Hercules missiles in November 1958.

SF-88 was inactivated in 1974 as part of the general continental United States phase-out of the Nike project. As part of SALT I, one missile site each could be retained by the United States and the Soviet Union for historical purposes, and SF-88 was chosen as the historical missile site in the United States. The Army agreed, and the land occupied by SF-88 was transferred to the National Park Service in 1974, to be retained as a "Historic Memorial to Air Defense – NIKE Hercules" with "Army technicians to remain on site to explain and demonstrate NIKE operation until replaced by Golden Gate National Recreation Area personnel." One caveat was that no explosives or classified information would accompany the transfer of SF-88, although the plan was to hold classified information at Fort Bliss until they were declassified. Final transfer to the National Park Service occurred on February 12, 1976.

A local chapter of the Military Vehicles Collectors Club started to restore the base in the early 1980s, beginning by pumping out water from the underground missile magazine. Another group of volunteers, led by retired COL Bud Halsey, took over restoration work in the mid-80s, cleaning up rust and retrieving parts and equipment, including enough missile parts (which had cost $30 million when new) to reconstruct the 5-ton missiles. The volunteer group started to conduct tours in early 1995, on the first Sunday of each month.

The present area open for tours is the launch area, SF-88L. The integrated fire control area, SF-88C, was part of the land transferred to the National Park Service but it has not been restored as SF-88L has due to the remote location and inclement weather at SF-88C. SF-88C lies on Wolf Ridge and can be accessed by foot from Fort Cronkhite. A High Power Acquisition Radar (HIPAR) was added to SF-88C in the early 1960s, resulting in the construction of a 50-foot (15 m) tall tower and dome which was the most striking aspect of SF-88C. The dome and tower have been removed, but the gravel pad remains. Other target tracking radar towers remain, albeit in a deteriorated condition, with the steel platforms collapsed and/or removed in the last ten years.

== Gallery ==
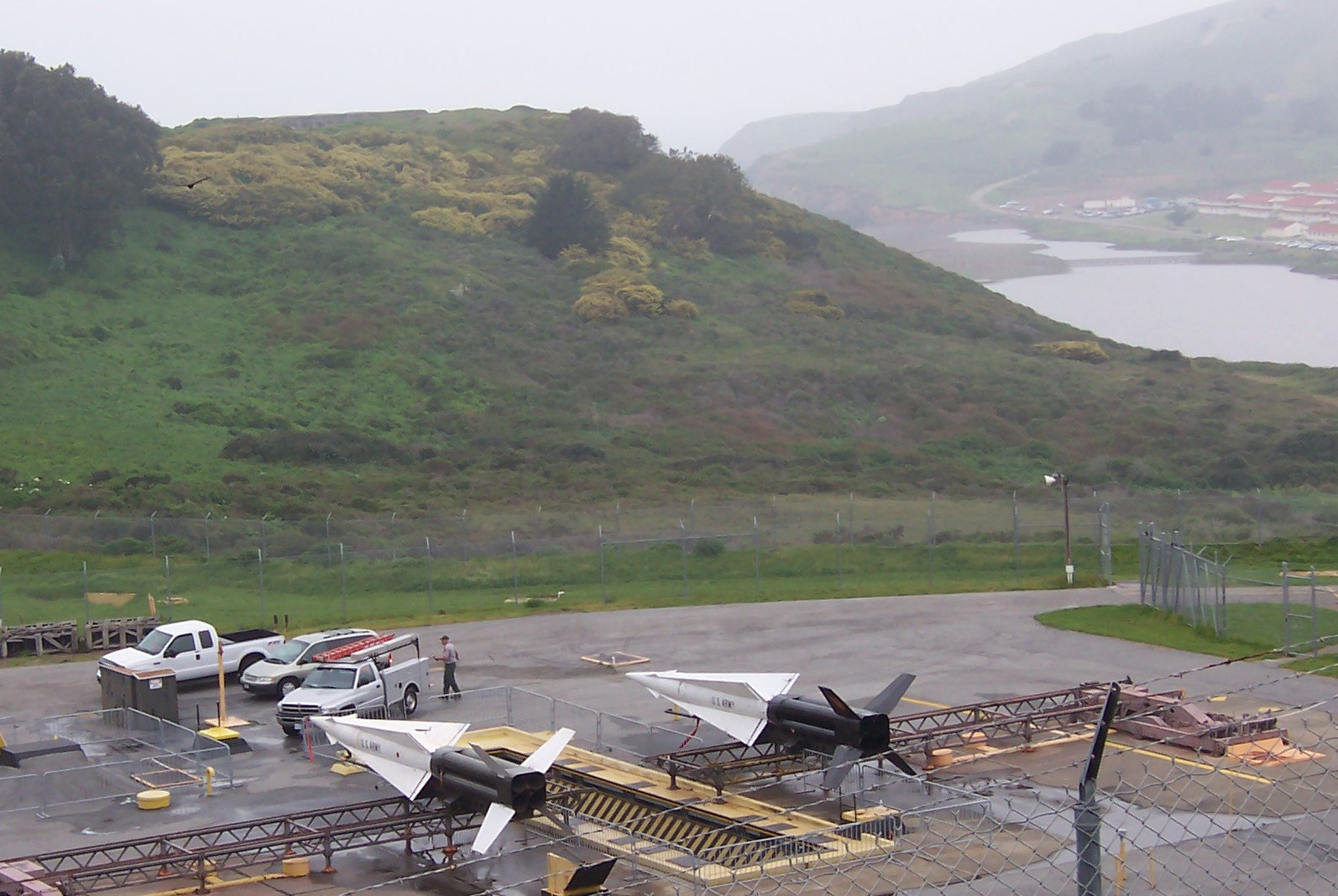
Overlooking the launch site at the former Fort Barry with Fort Cronkhite visible across Rodeo Lagoon

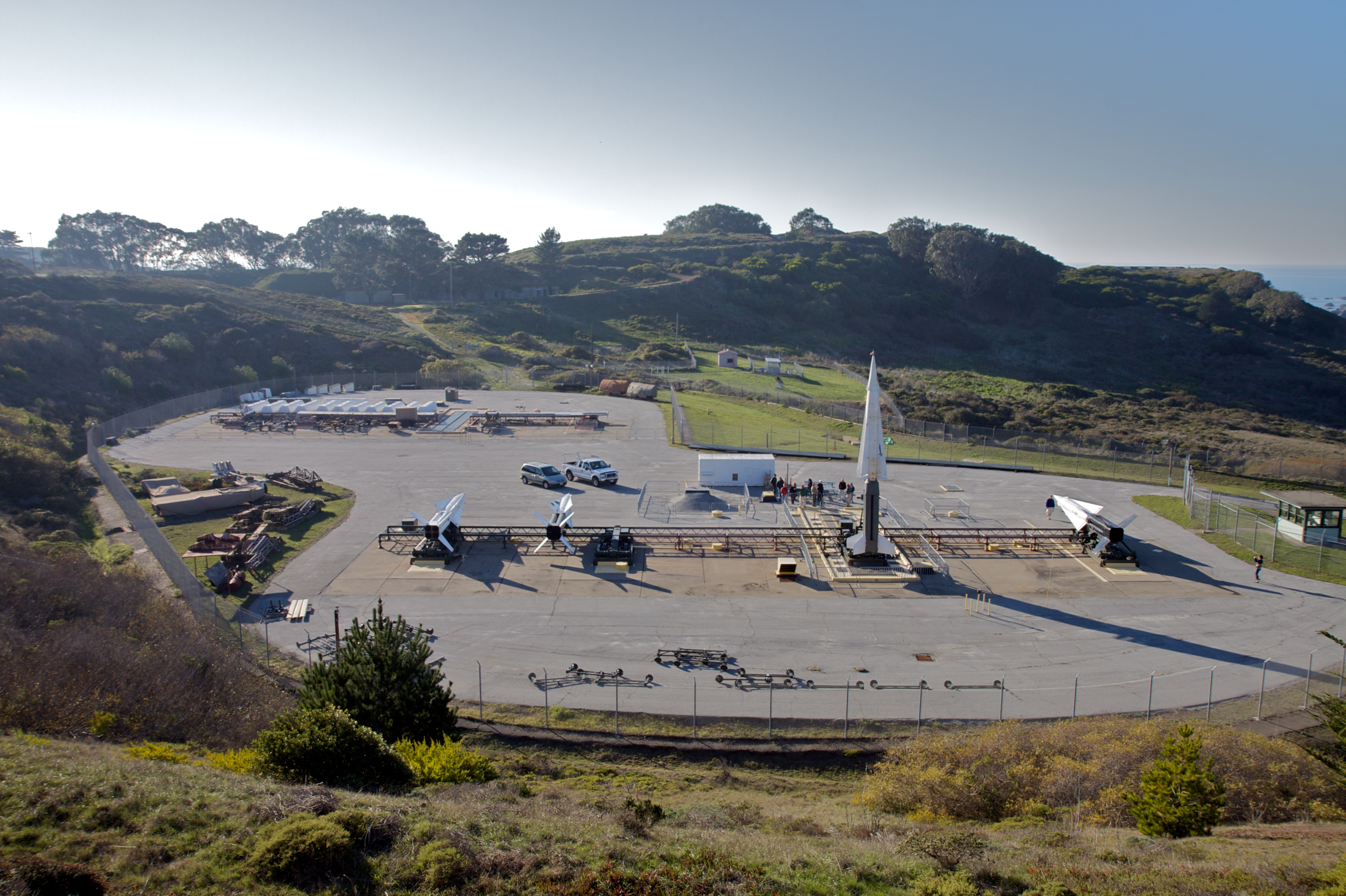
View of launch area

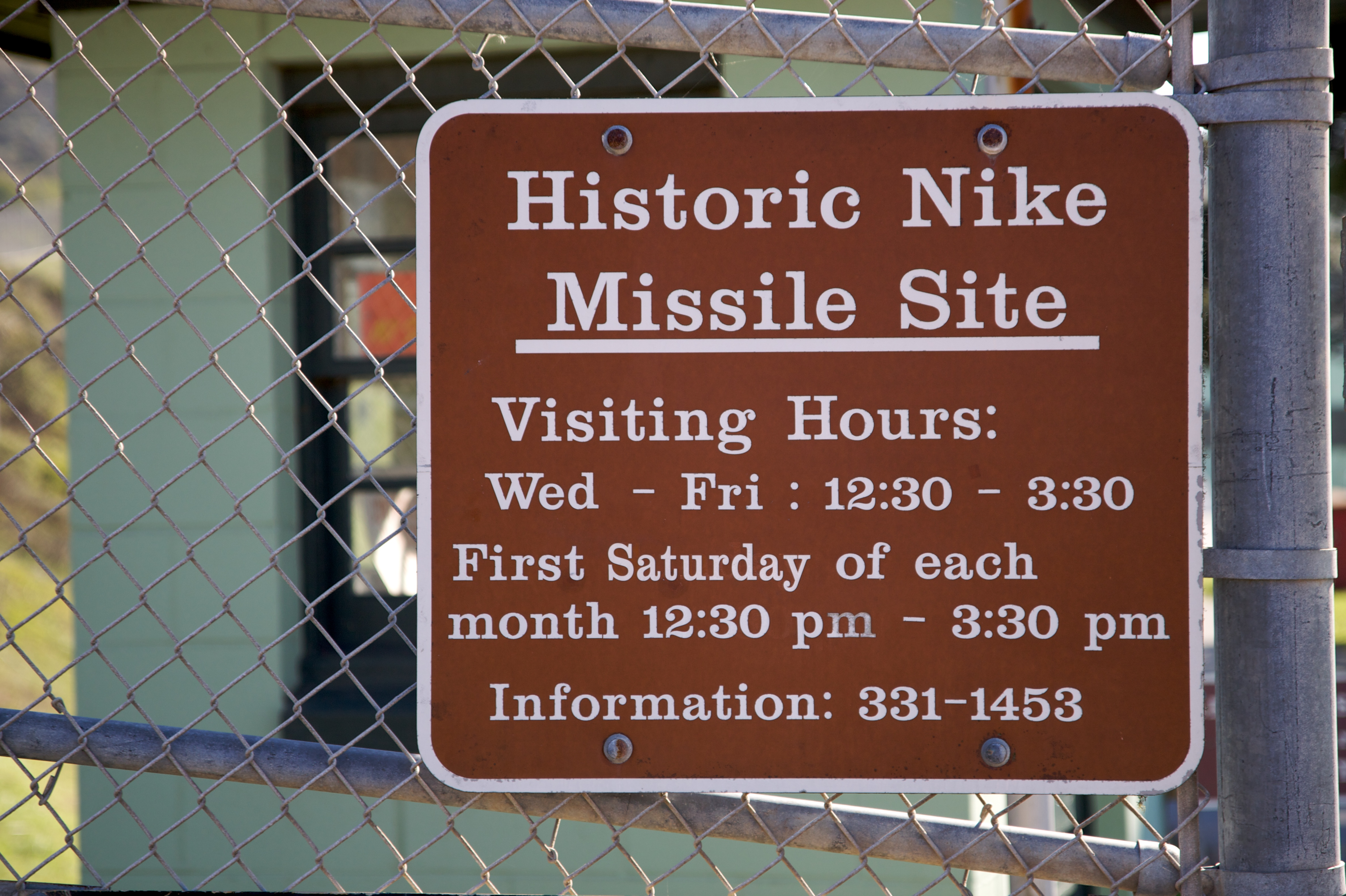
Museum opening hours

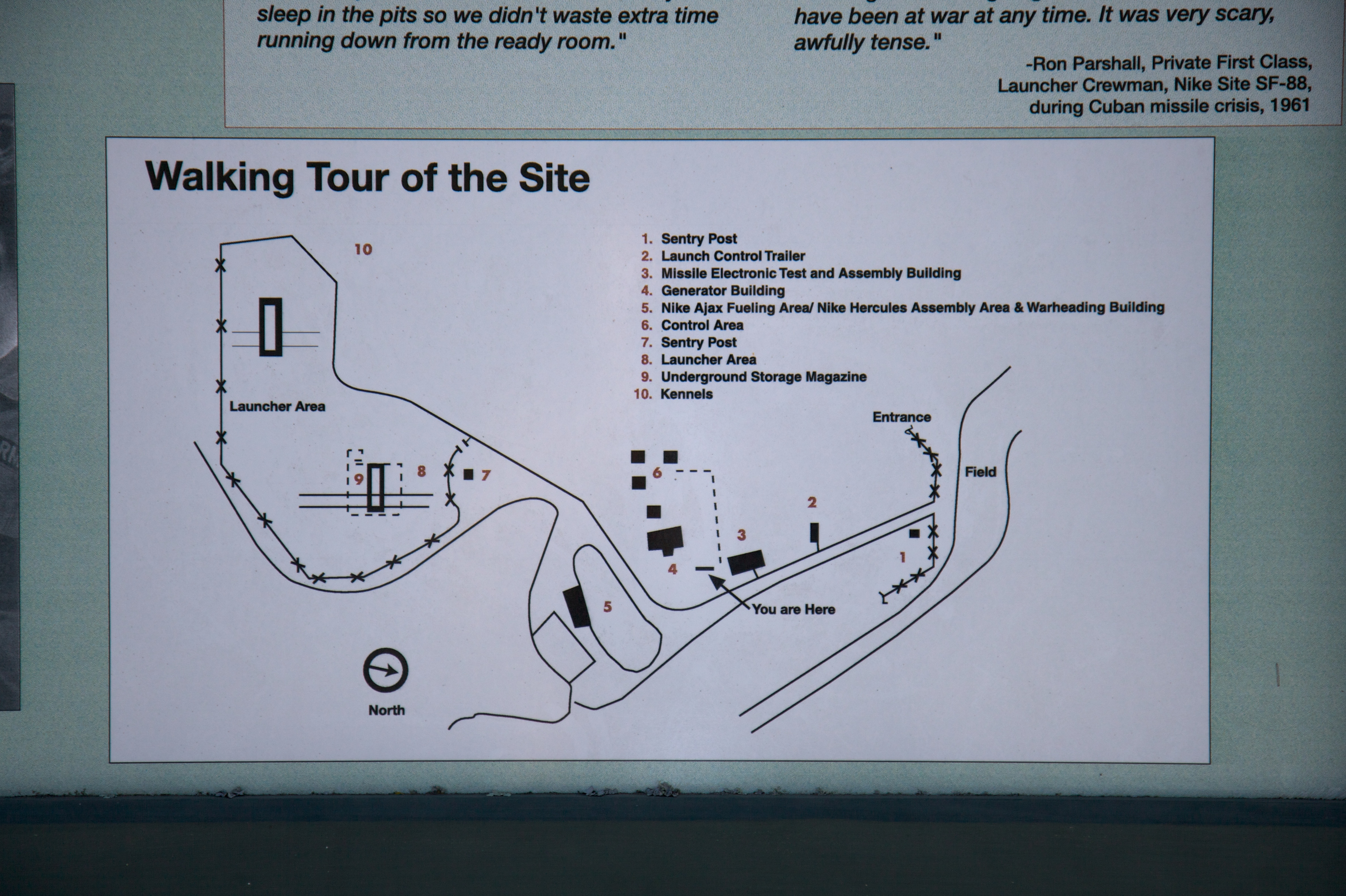
Site map

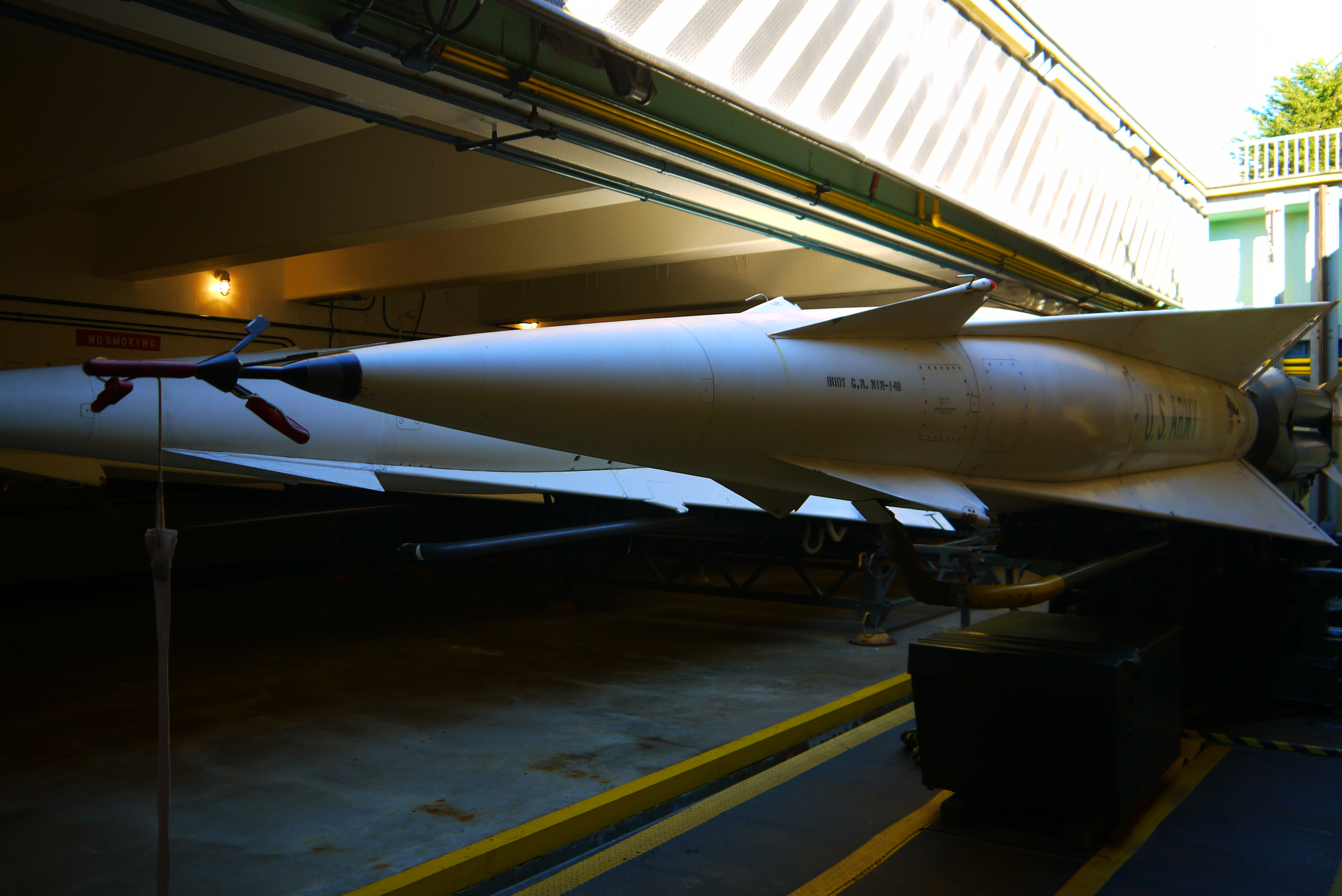
Underground storage

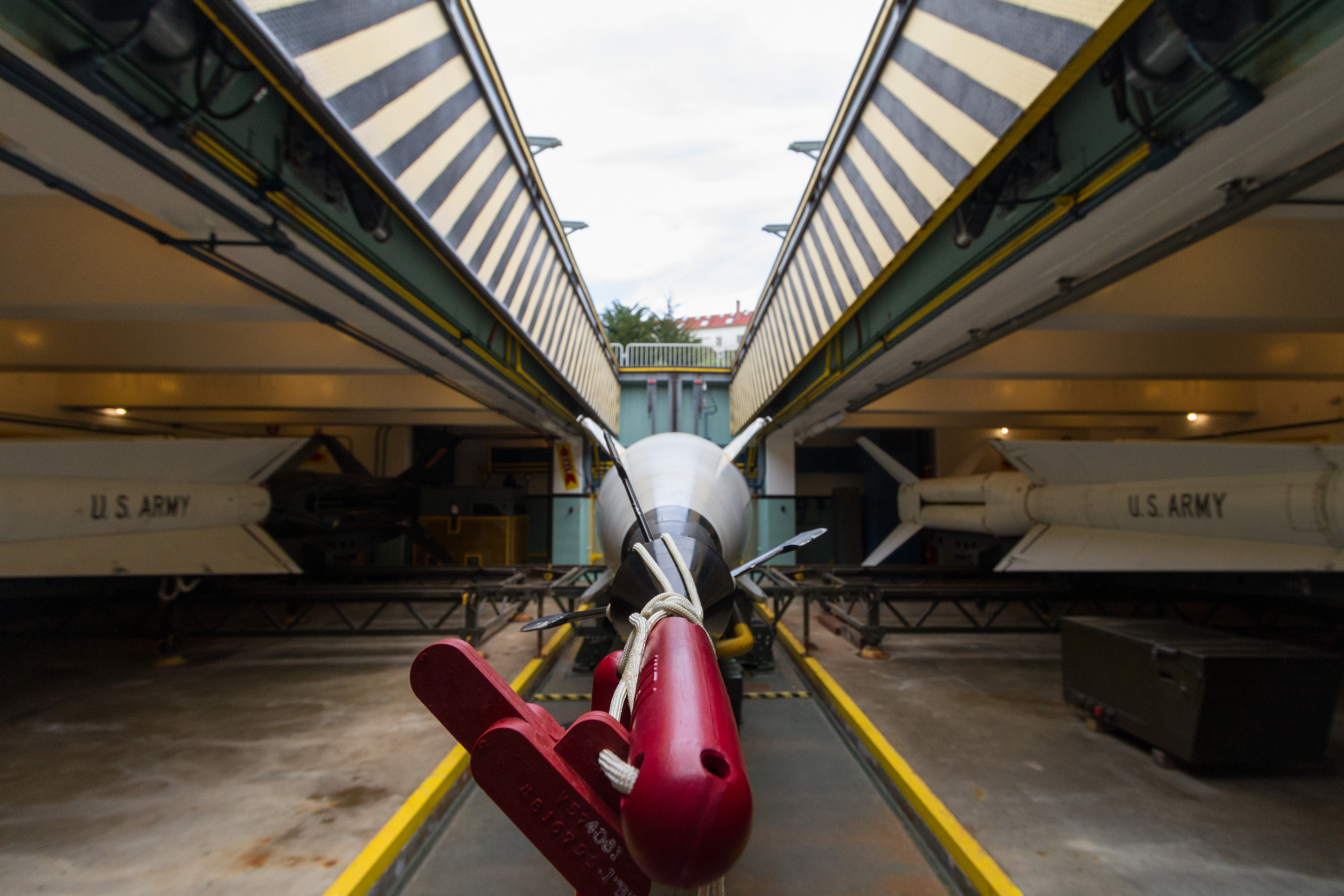
Missiles in underground storage with elevator doors open

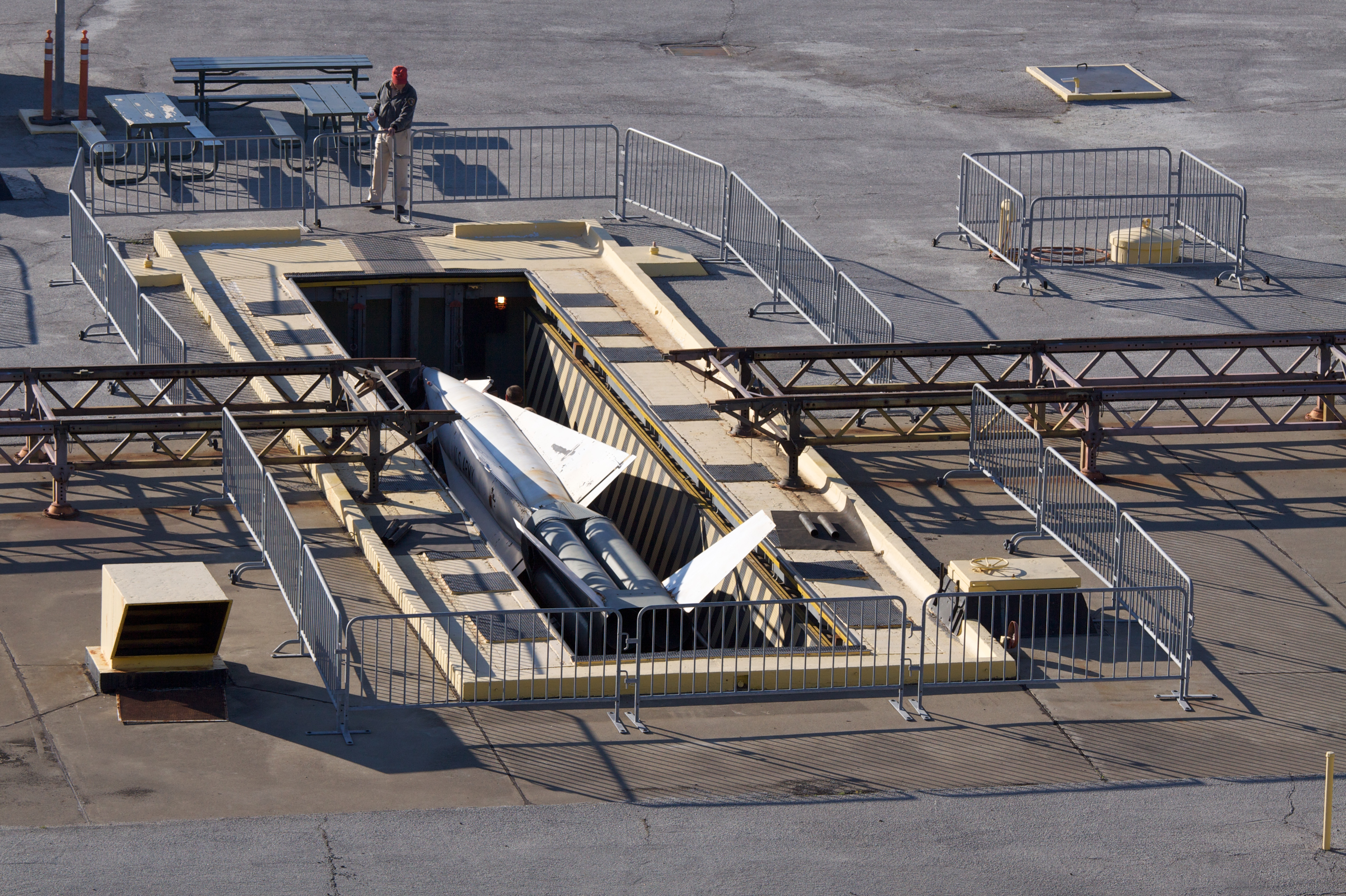
Missile emerging from underground storage

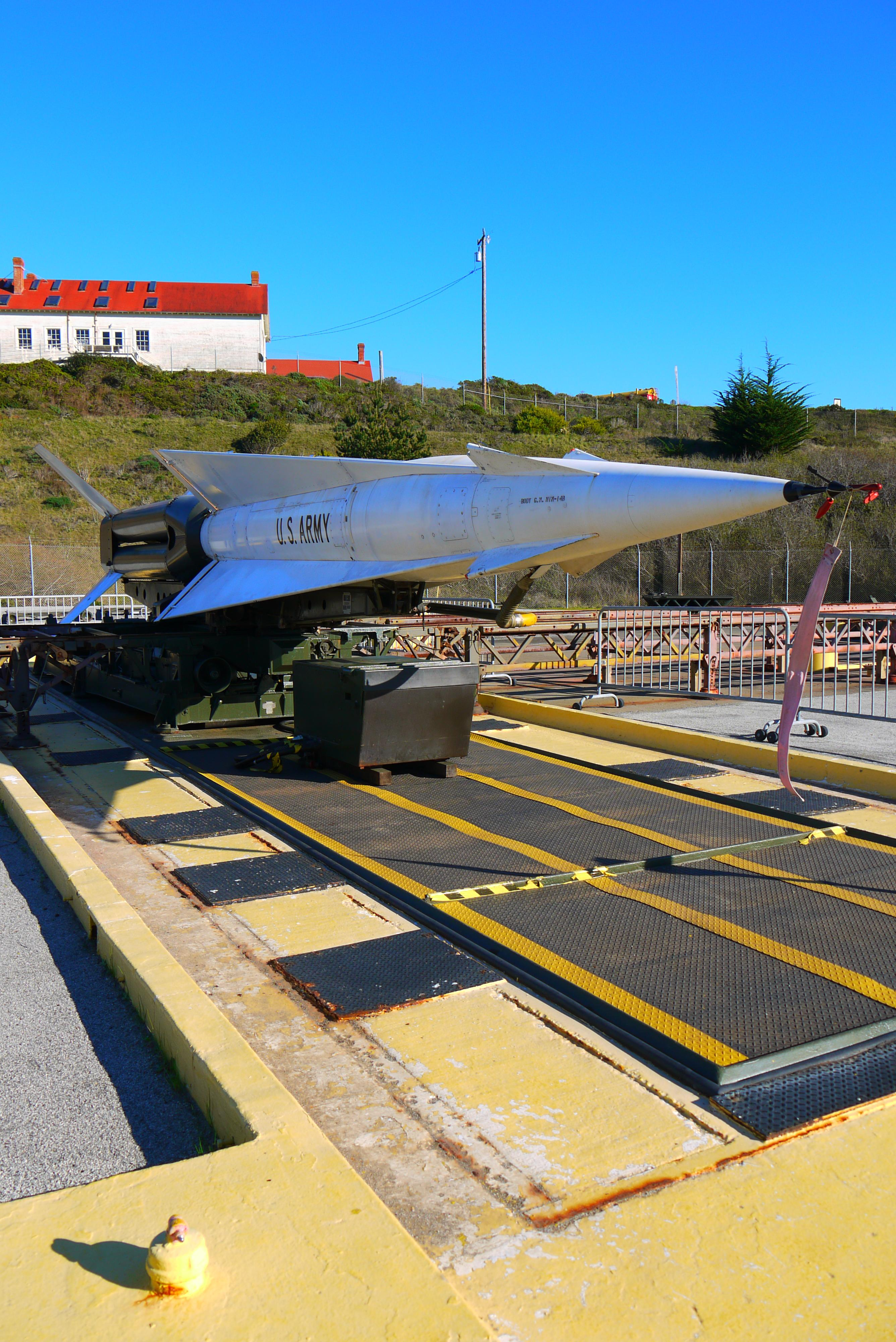
Missile raised from elevators

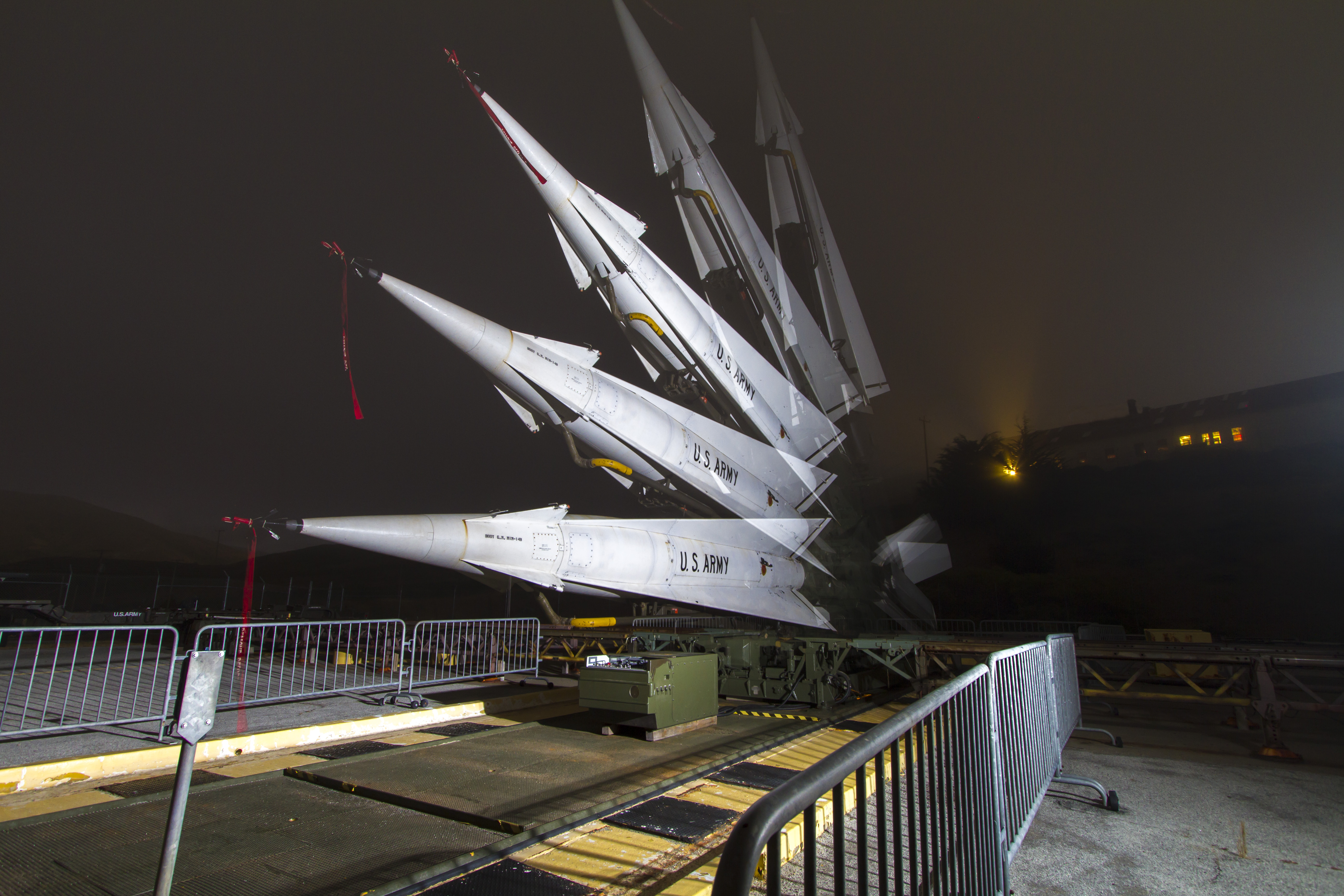
Time-lapse erection sequence

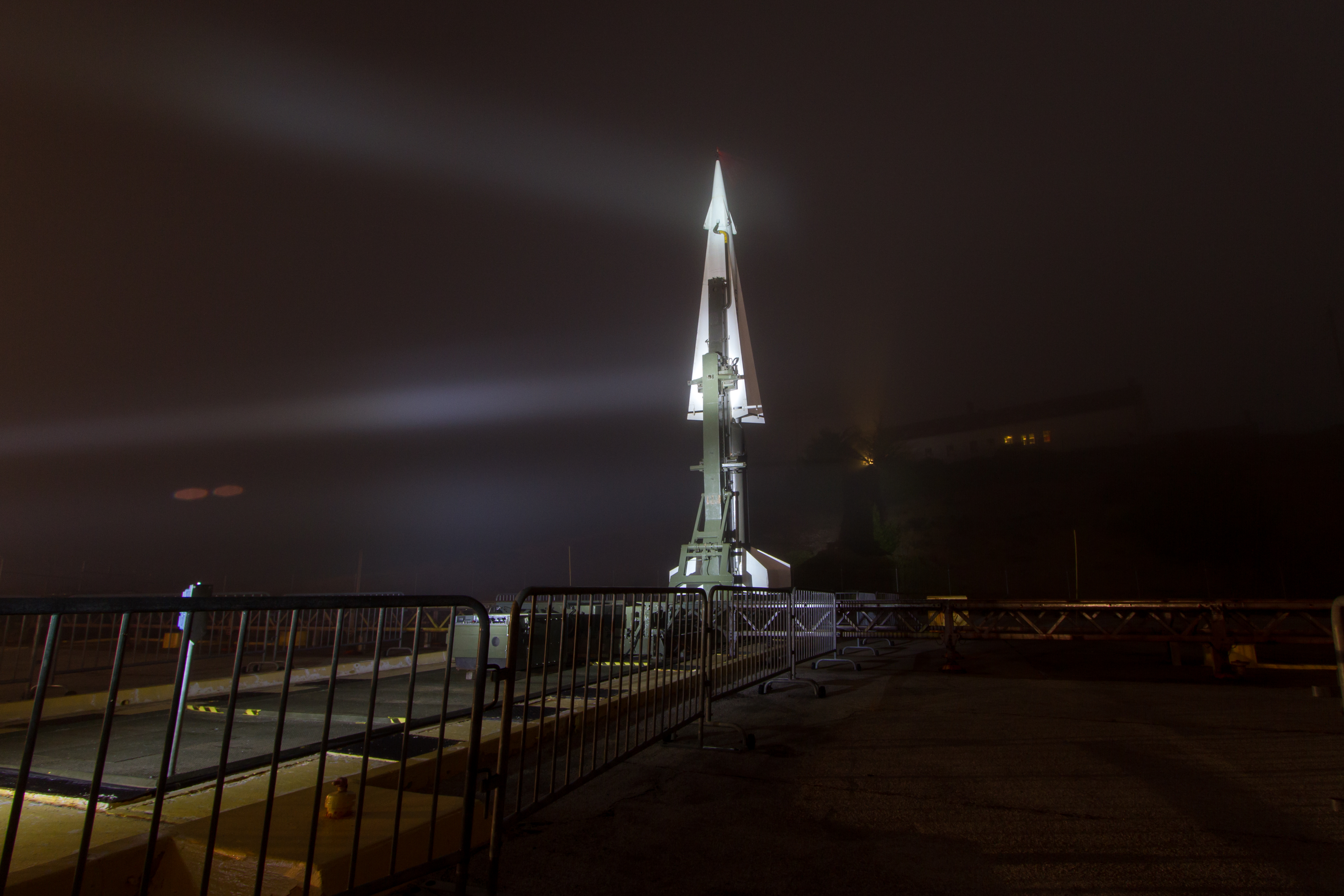
Missile erected for launch

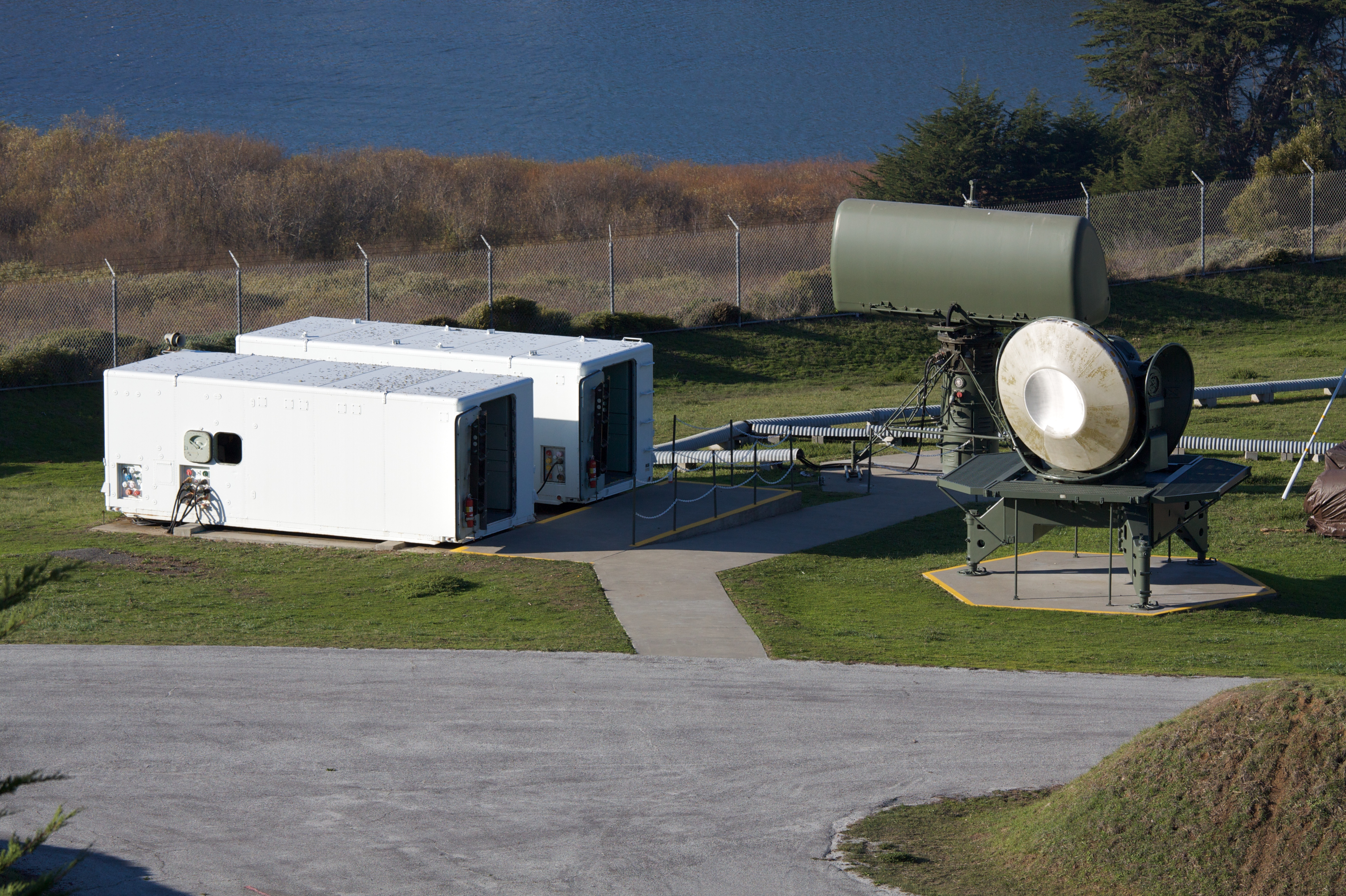
Radars (relocated from SF-88C)

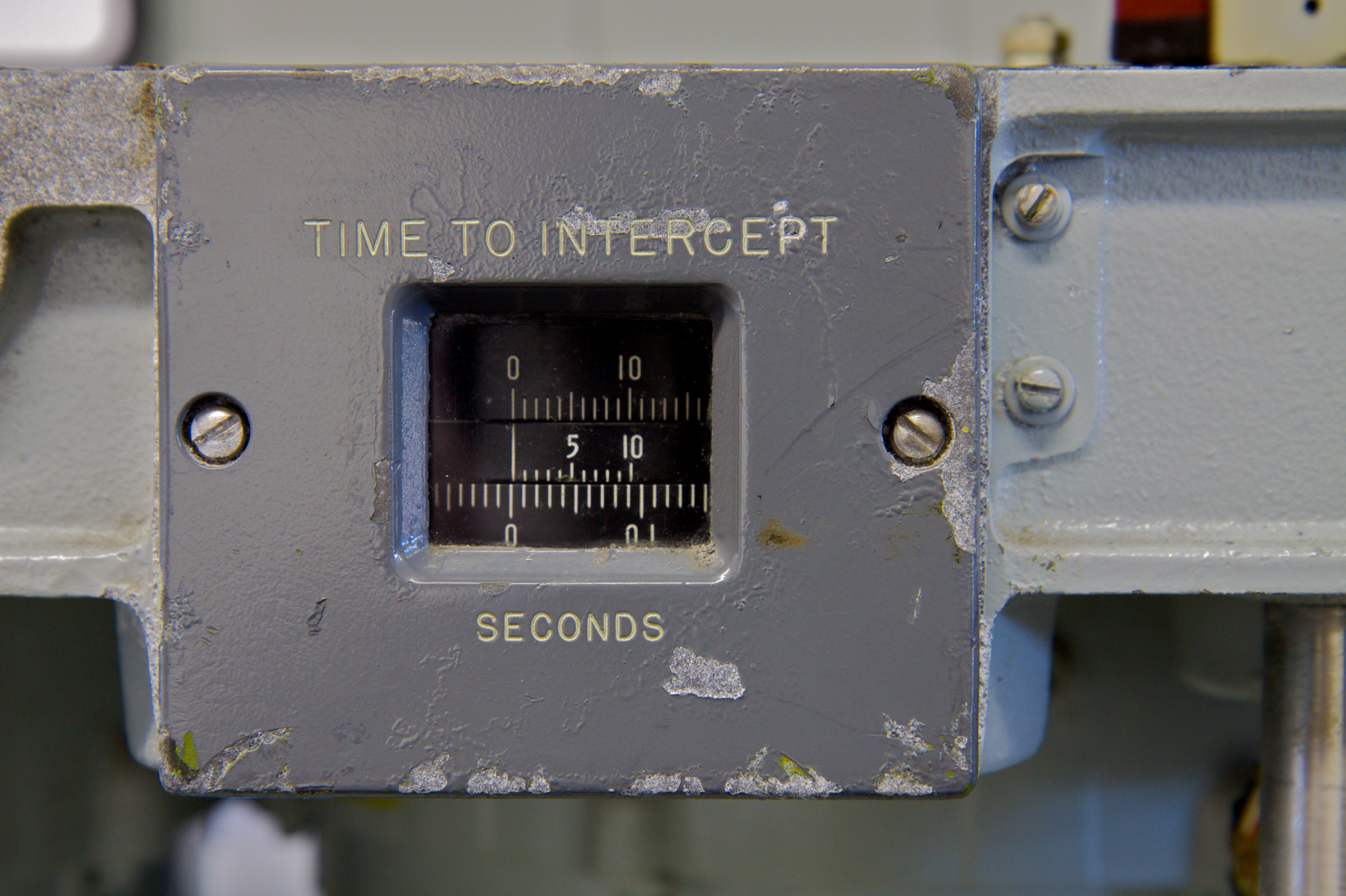
Time to intercept

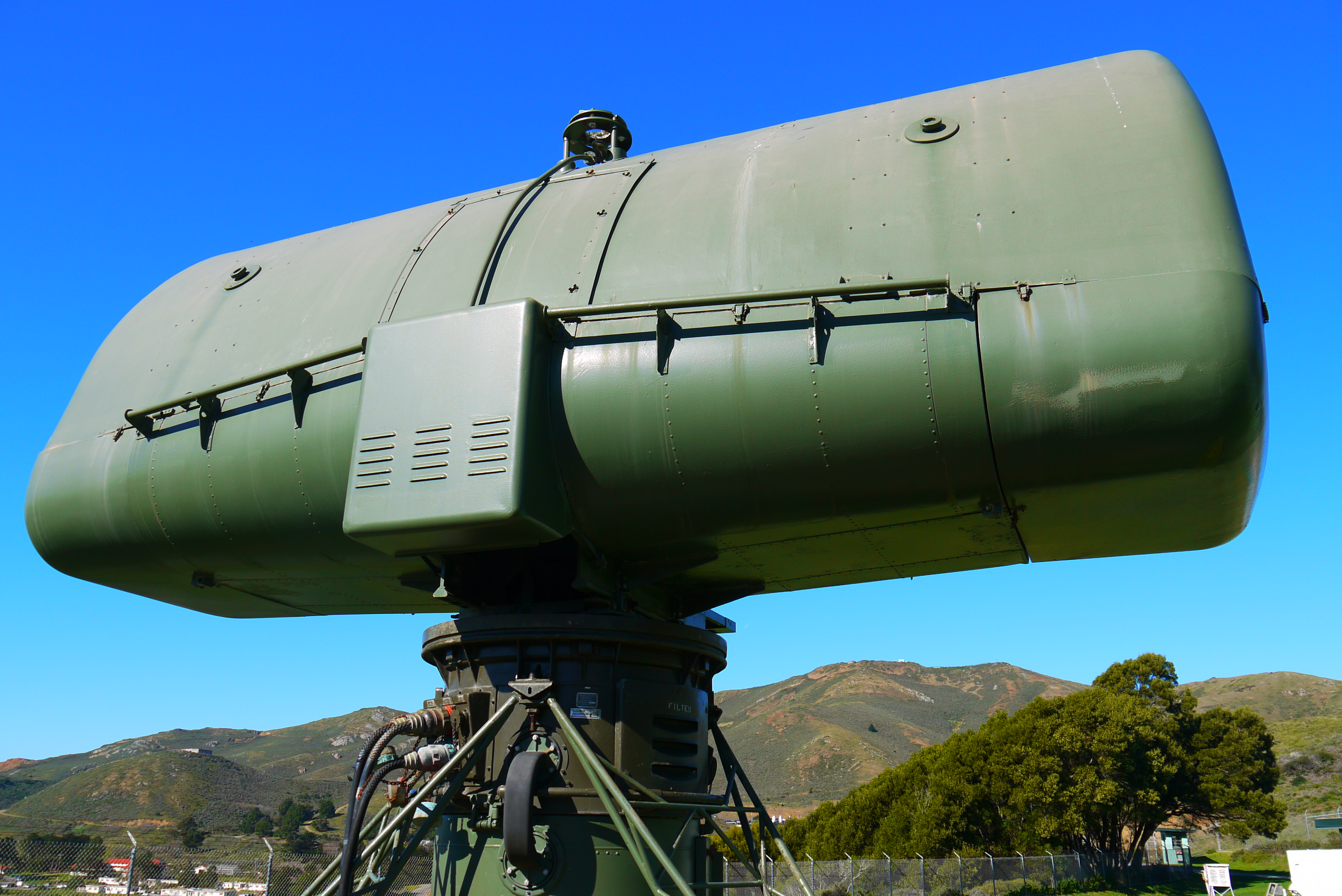
Low Power Acquisition Radar (LOPAR) antenna, relocated from SF-88C

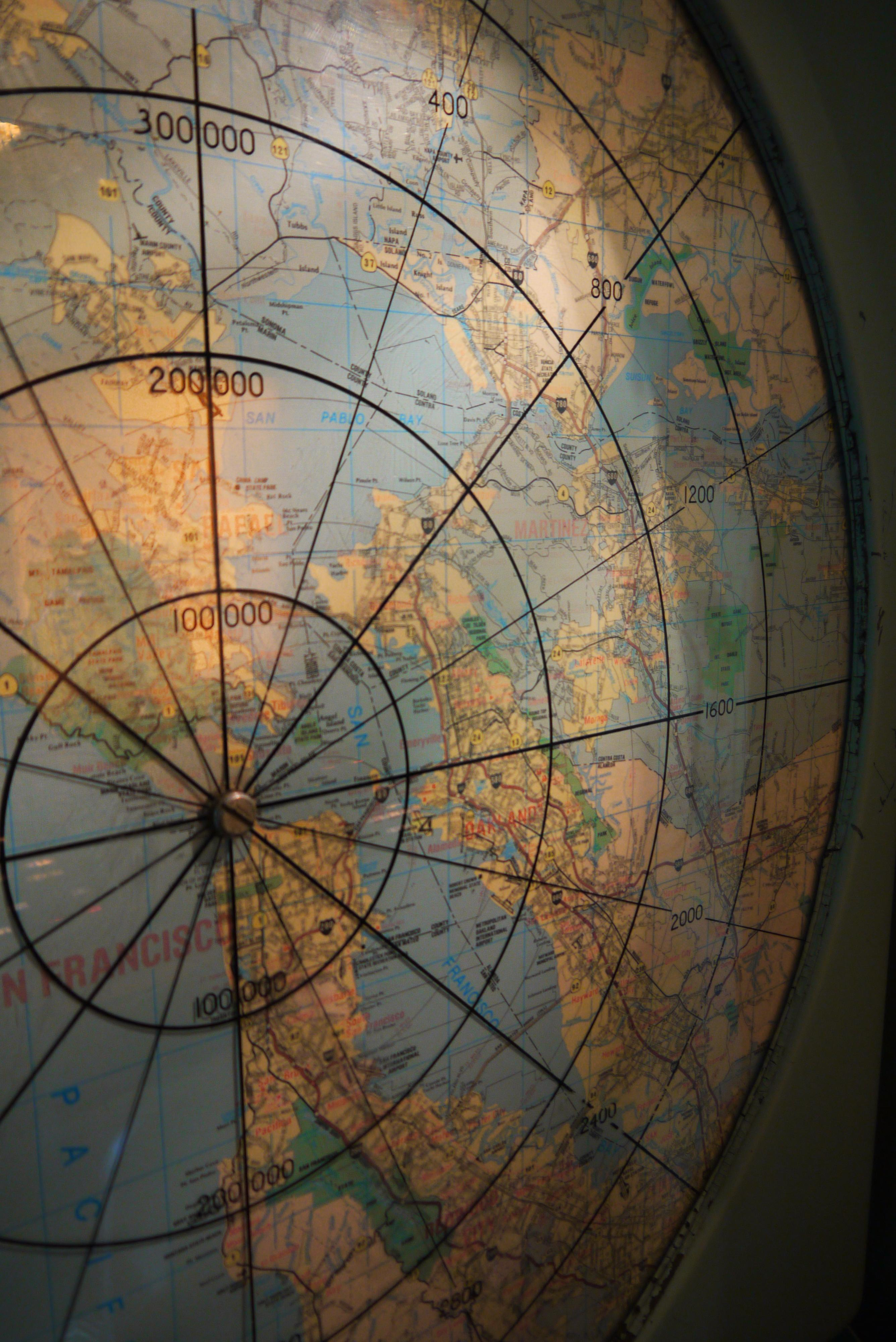
Schematic map

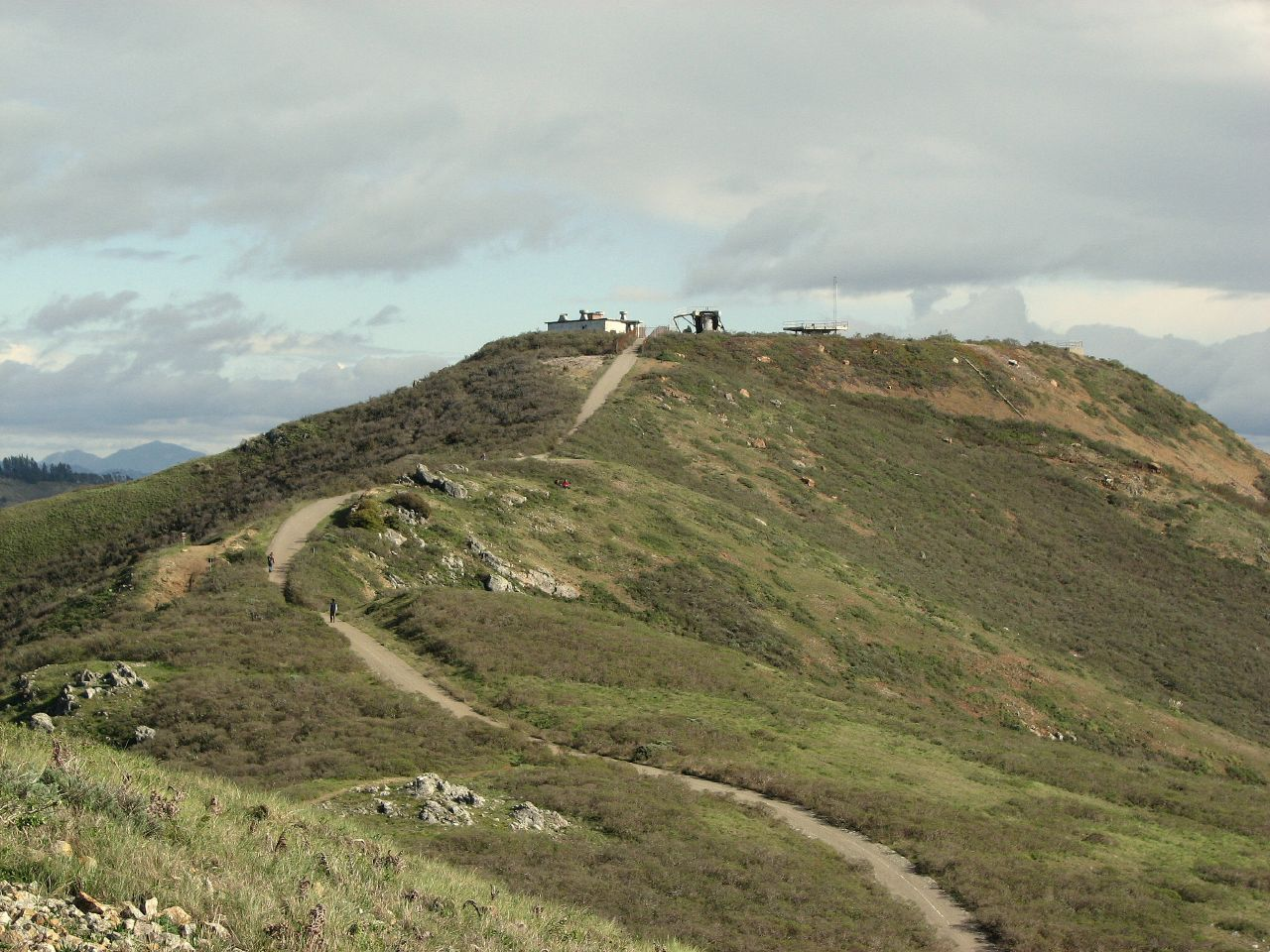
SF-88C on Wolf Ridge

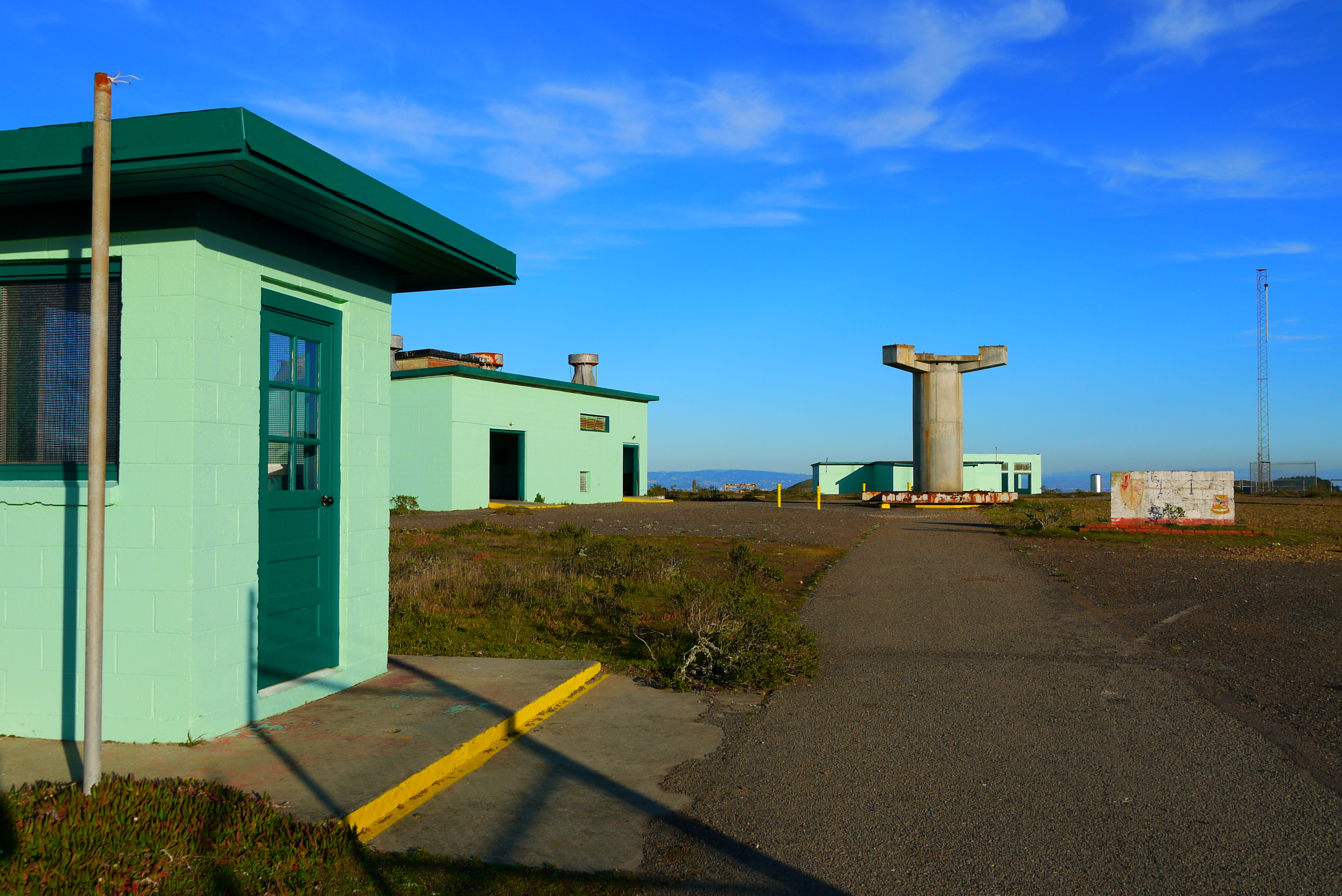
Entrance to SF-88C in 2011

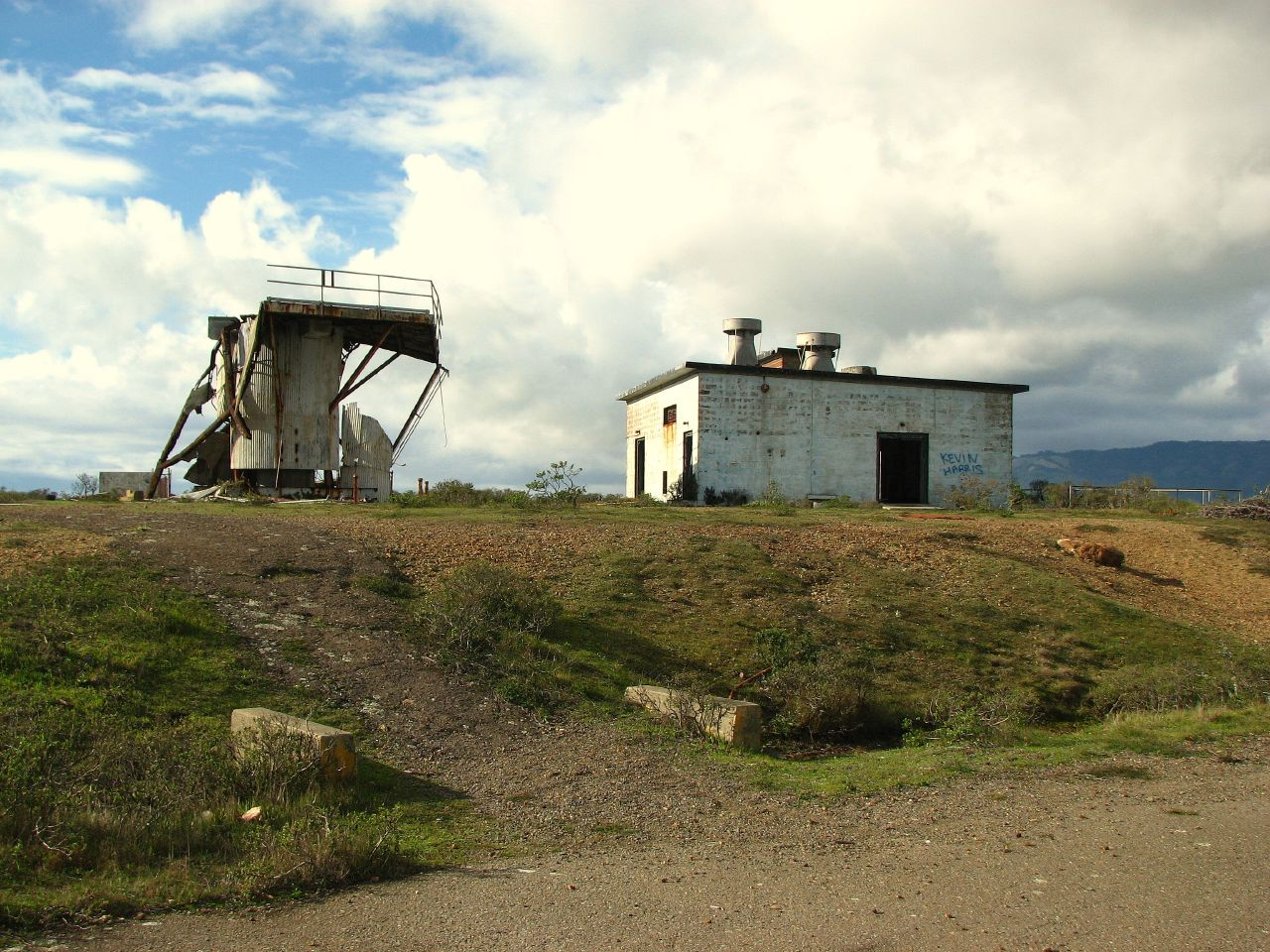
SF-88C collapsed Target Tracking Radar (TTR) platform

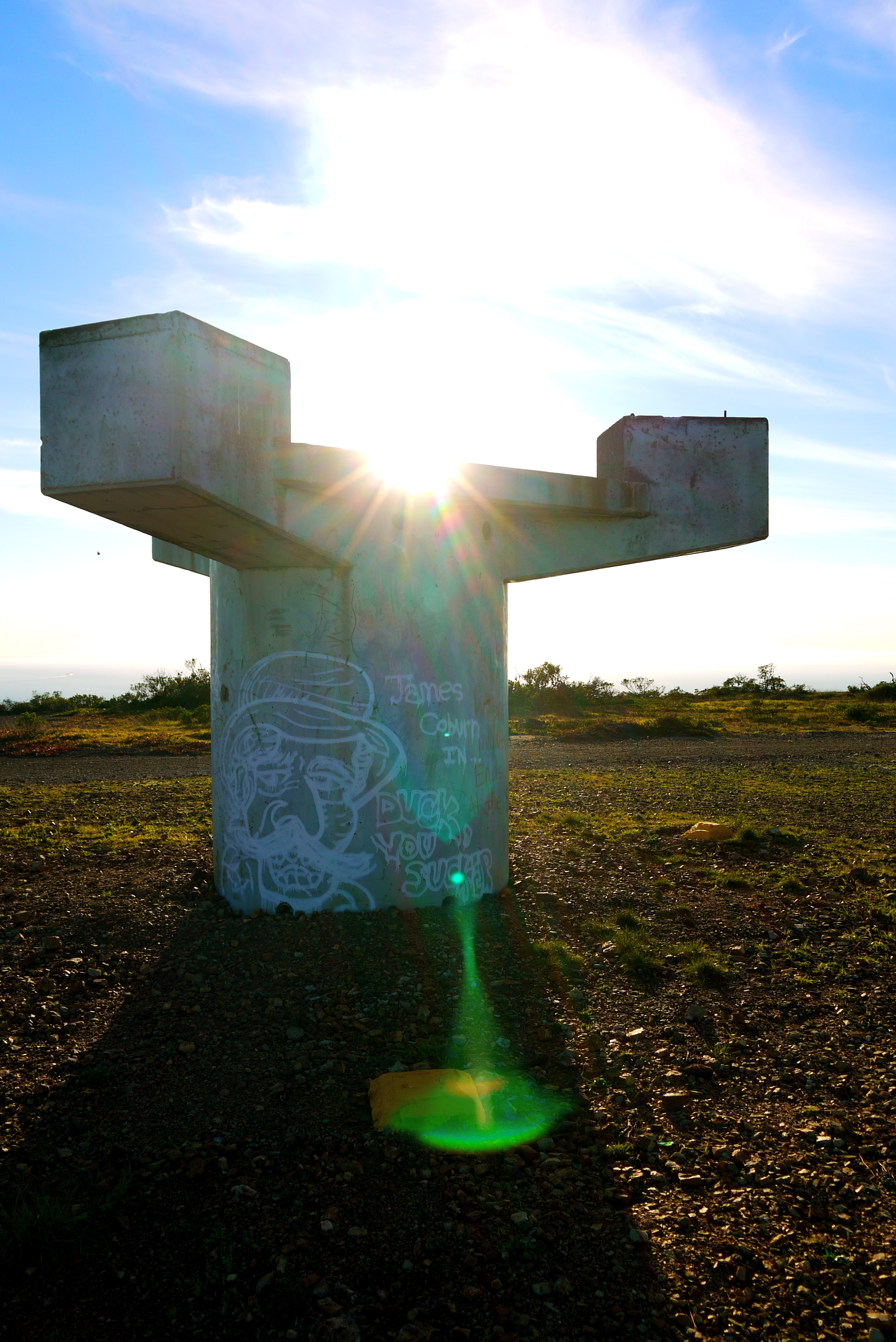
TTR platform base at SF-88C (rusted platform removed)

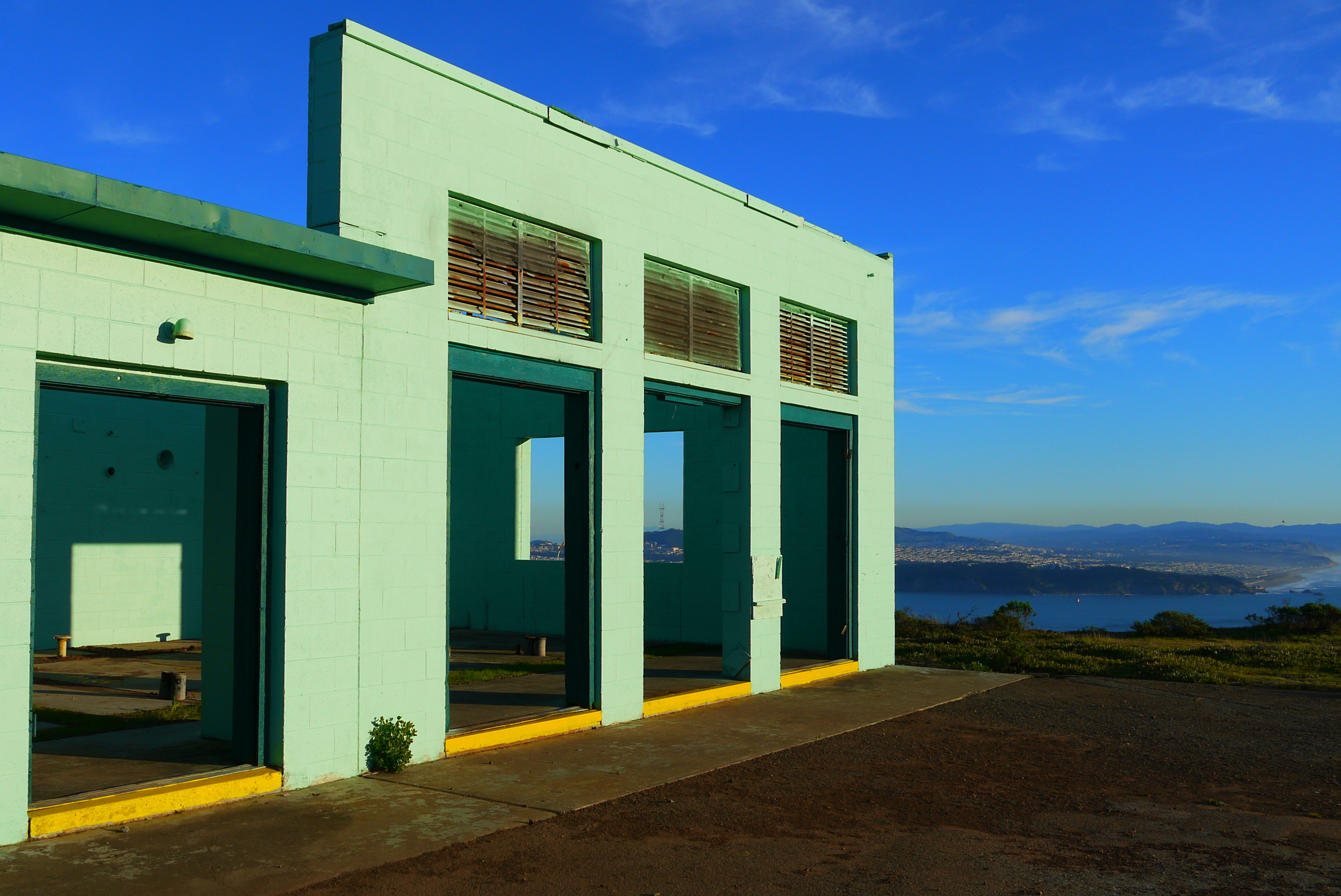
Building at SF-88C

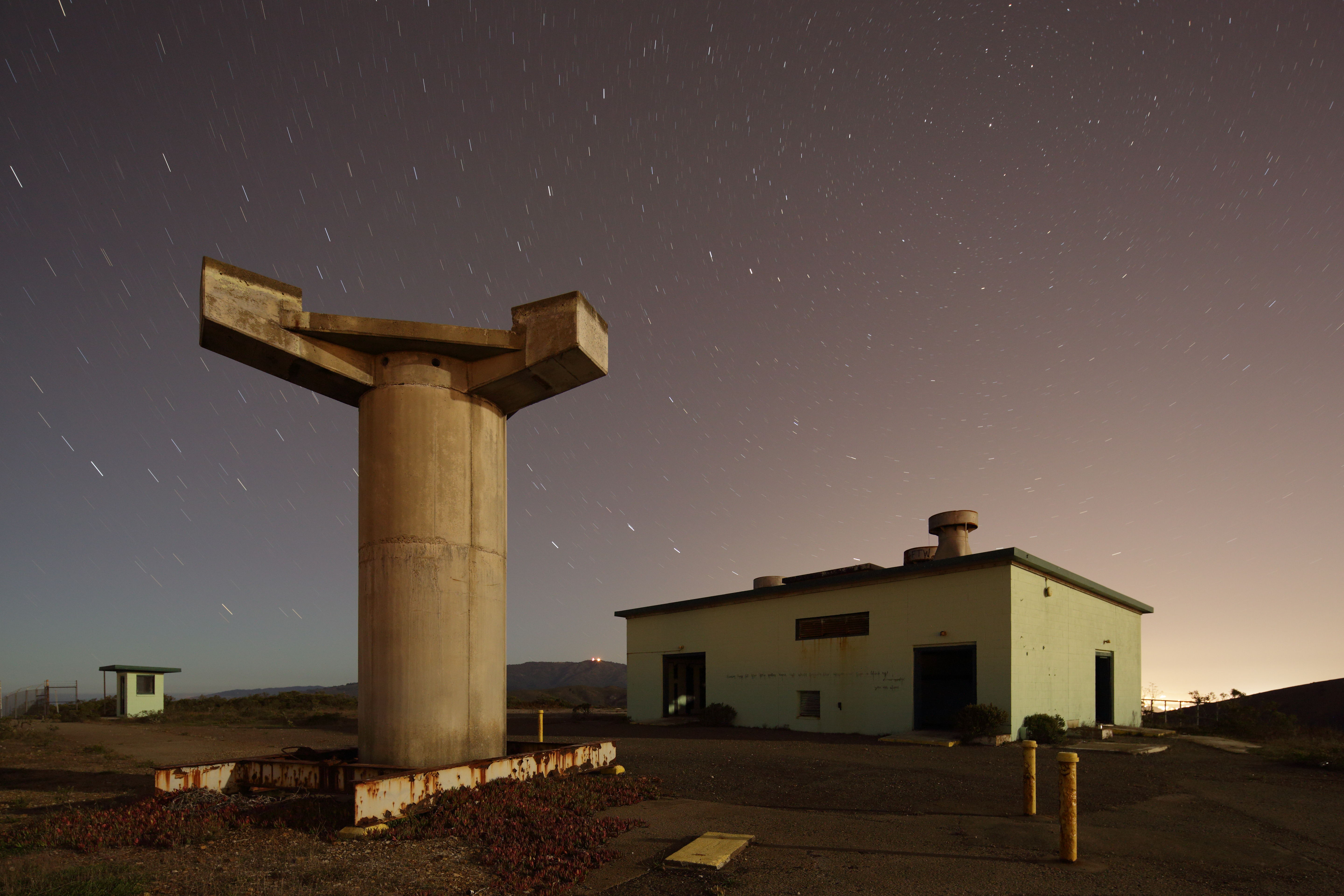
One of the remaining TTR bases at SF-88C. High Power Acquisition Radar (HIPAR) building in the background.

== See also ==
- List of Nike missile sites
- Fort Cronkhite
