= Centissima Reef =

Pacific reef off California, US

Coordinates: 37.827984°N 122.549976°W

Centissima Reef is the reef which surrounds Sears Rock west of Rodeo Beach in the Pacific Ocean off Marin County, California. Some early reports refer to Centissima Rock and Sears Rock as separate sub-surface navigation hazards, but present-day nautical charts show Sears Rock as part of the larger Centissima Reef.

A 1908 report on San Francisco Bay stated that a survey was then in progress to investigate the cost of removing both Sears Rock and Centissima Reef, along with Mission Bay Rock and Sonoma Rock, near Mission Rock in San Francisco Bay. In 1922, Representative Julius Kahn told a congressional committee that neither Sears Rock nor Centissima posed a navigation hazard as they had been blasted several years previously: "They are not visible, neither of them. ... [Centissima Rock] is practically at 40 feet. It is a little below the channel, a little south of the channel."
