= New Guardians for the Golden Gate =

New Guardians for the Golden Gate: How America Got a Great National Park
- Author: Amy Meyer
- Publisher: University of California Press
- Publication date: August 2006
- Pages: 390
- ISBN: 978-0-520-23534-2

New Guardians for the Golden Gate: How America Got a Great National Park is a 2006 book by Amy Meyer which discusses the creation of the Golden Gate National Recreation Area in the early 1970s.
