= Sears Rock =

Subsurface rock off the shore of California

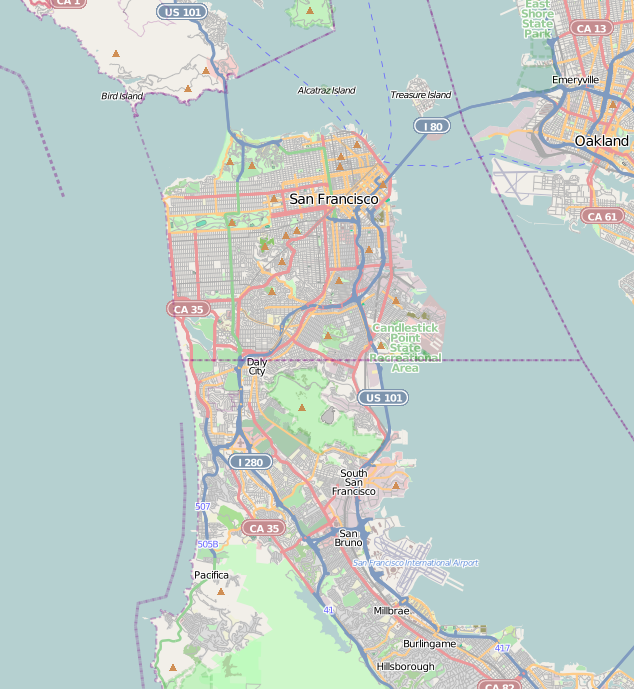
- Location within San Francisco Location within San Francisco Bay Area Location within California Location within the United States

Geography
- Location: Northern California
- Coordinates: 37°49′43″N 122°32′57″W
- Adjacent to: Pacific Ocean

Administration
- United States
- State: California
- County: Marin

Sears Rock (sometimes Sear's Rock) is a small sub-surface rock about 0.7 miles (1.1 km) west of Rodeo Beach in the Pacific Ocean off Marin County, California. It is the highest point of the larger Centissima Reef, a sub-surface navigation hazard east of the Bonita Channel, although some reports refer to the two as separate features.

A 1908 report on San Francisco Bay stated that a survey was then in progress to investigate the cost of removing both Sears Rock and Centissima Reef, along with Mission Bay Rock and Sonoma Rock, near Mission Rock in San Francisco Bay. In 1922, Representative Julius Kahn told a congressional committee that neither Sears Rock nor Centissima posed a navigation hazard as they had been blasted several years previously: "They are not visible, neither of them. The Sear's was blasted to a depth of 40 feet some five or six years ago. It is never visible at all. There are some people who think that it ought to be blasted to a depth of 45 feet, but the men who navigate the vessels think 40 feet for the present time a sufficient depth."

== See also ==
- List of islands of California
