= Rodeo Lagoon =

Lagoon in Marin County, California, U.S.

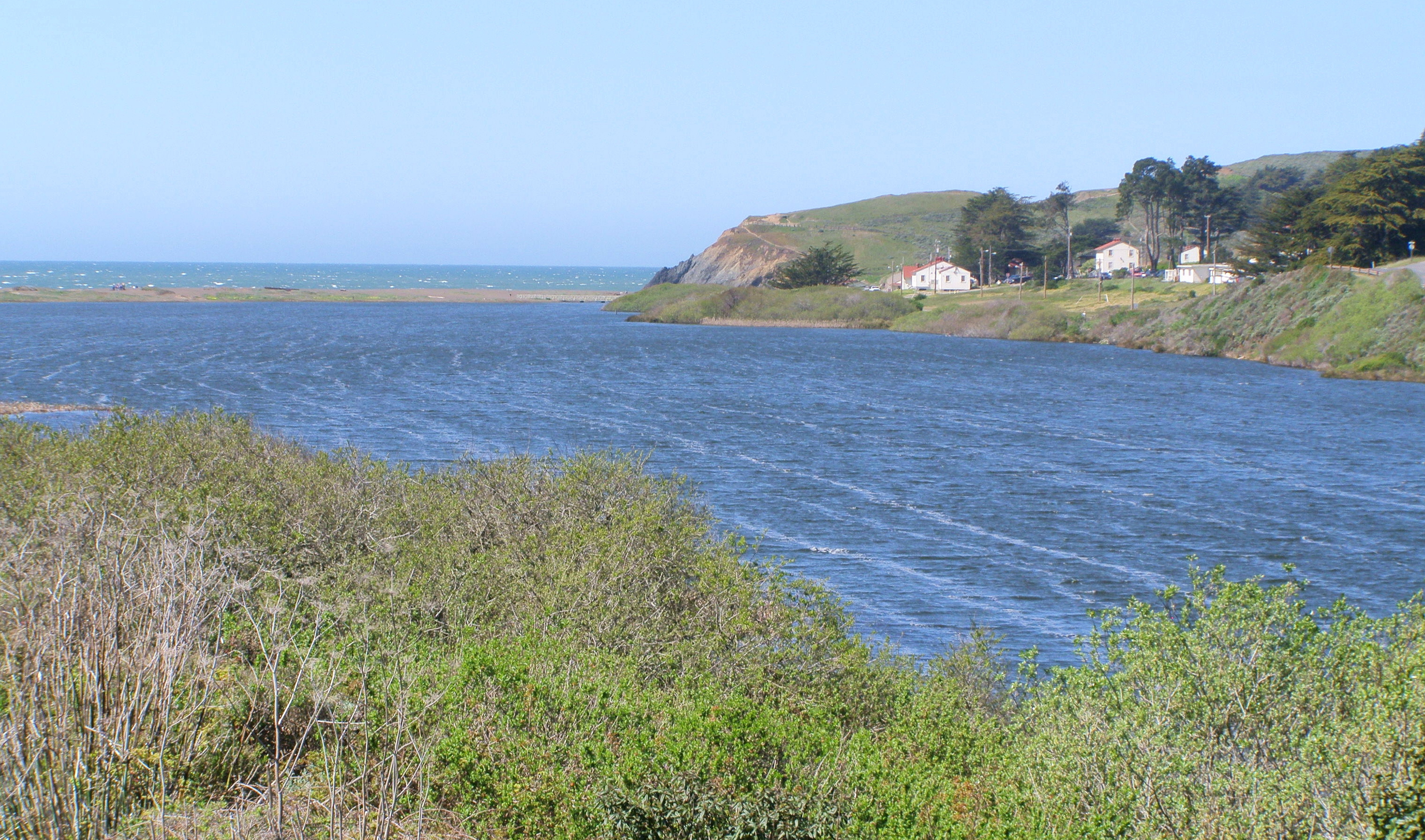
- Rodeo Lagoon, viewed on a windy day from its southeast corner

- Location within California
- Location: Marin County, California
- Coordinates: 37°49′51″N 122°31′52″W
- Type: lagoon
- Max. length: 900 metres (3,000 ft)
- Max. width: 250 metres (820 ft)
- Surface area: 15 hectares (37 acres)
- Max. depth: 2 metres (6.6 ft)

Rodeo Lagoon is a coastal lagoon located in the Marin Headlands division of the Golden Gate National Recreation Area, which is in southern Marin County, California. This brackish water body is separated from the Pacific Ocean by a sand bar that forms Rodeo Beach. Rodeo Lagoon stretches approximately 900 metres (3,000 ft) by 250 metres (820 ft), and is about 2 metres (6.6 ft) deep at its maximum depth. It covers a surface area of about 15 hectares (37 acres).

== Inflows and outflows ==
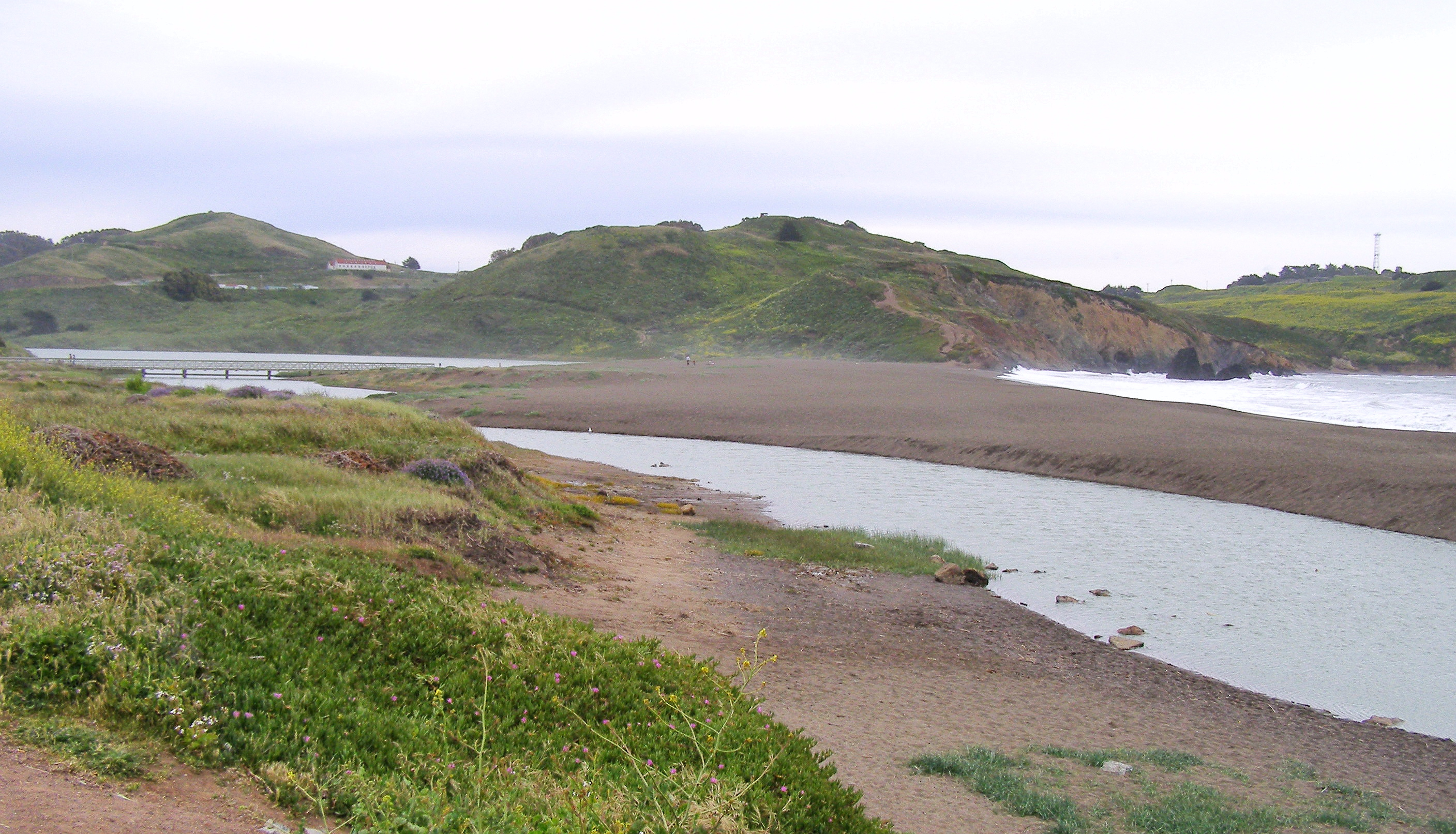
Outlet channel of Rodeo Lagoon

Rodeo Lagoon empties into the Pacific Ocean when the water level reaches a high enough level to erode through the sand bar. This high water level usually occurs in the winter months. The outlet channel, shown at left looking southeast towards Rodeo Lagoon, is spanned by a pedestrian bridge that provides access to Rodeo Beach. Like many other coastal lagoons in California, the outlet becomes completely blocked by a sand bar during the dry summer months, resulting in negligible exchange between the lagoon and ocean during that time.

The depth, surface area, and volume of the lagoon all vary depending on the configuration of the sand berm (high or low) and rainfall (wet or dry). Depths in the center range from less than 1.5 metres (4.9 ft) in a dry summer to nearly 3 metres (9.8 ft) in a wet winter.

Tides do not have a significant effect on the circulation of water in Rodeo Lagoon. Instead, the circulation of water in Rodeo Lagoon is driven almost entirely by the wind. Since the Marin Headlands are often quite windy, it is not unusual to see Langmuir circulation form windrows of foam on the surface of the lagoon.

Rodeo Lagoon is a brackish water body, with salinities in most of the lagoon ranging from 2 to 10 practical salinity units (psu) over the course of the year. However, water near the bottom of the lagoon is often much saltier, reaching levels as high as 25 psu. The bowl-shaped bathymetry of the lagoon traps this dense, salty water and prevents it from quickly draining back out in the ocean.

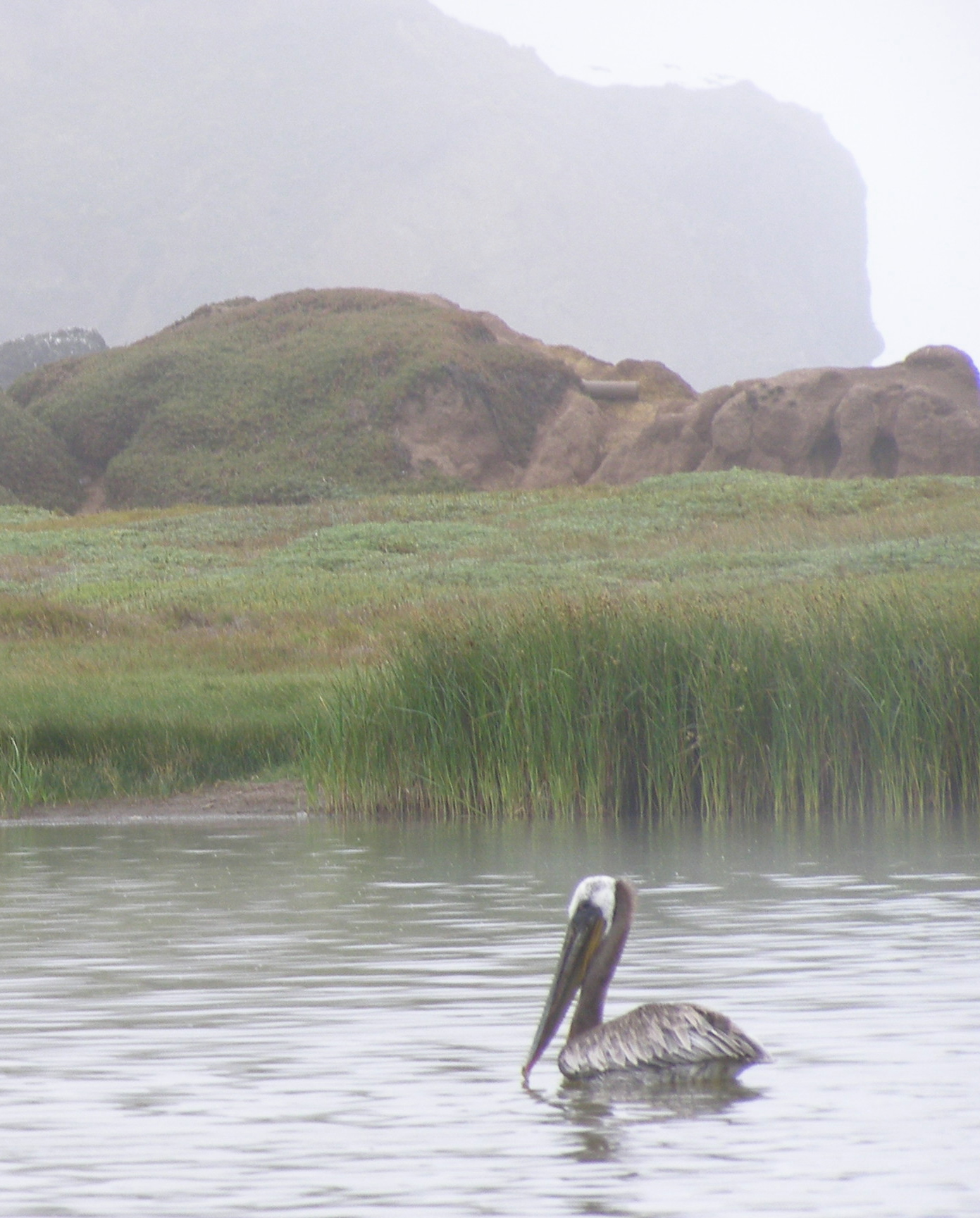
A brown pelican floating in Rodeo Lagoon

== Wildlife ==
Rodeo Lagoon provides habitat to a protected species, the tidewater goby. It also provides habitat to many species of migrating waterfowl. Resident fish include the threespine stickleback and prickly sculpin in addition to the tidewater goby. A family of river otters also makes frequent use of the lagoon, and includes brown pelicans in their summer diet. The lagoon is ringed by emergent aquatic vegetation, such as willows and cattail, and has submerged aquatic vegetation like sago pondweed and widgeon grass in the shallow areas. The phytoplankton community includes diatoms, chlorophytes, flagellated protozoa, Microcystis aeruginosa, and Nodularia spumigena. Microcystis sp. and Nodularia sp. are types of toxic cyanobacteria, capable of releasing the toxins microcystin and nodularin into the water.

== Eutrophication ==
The population of phytoplankton described above is extremely high in the summer, a condition known as eutrophication. At times, the algae form a visible surface scum, and their high concentration results in large swings in the dissolved oxygen content of the water, culminating in a depletion of oxygen when the population finally crashes. This annual algae bloom, because of its size and potential toxicity, is considered problematic for water quality and fish survival.

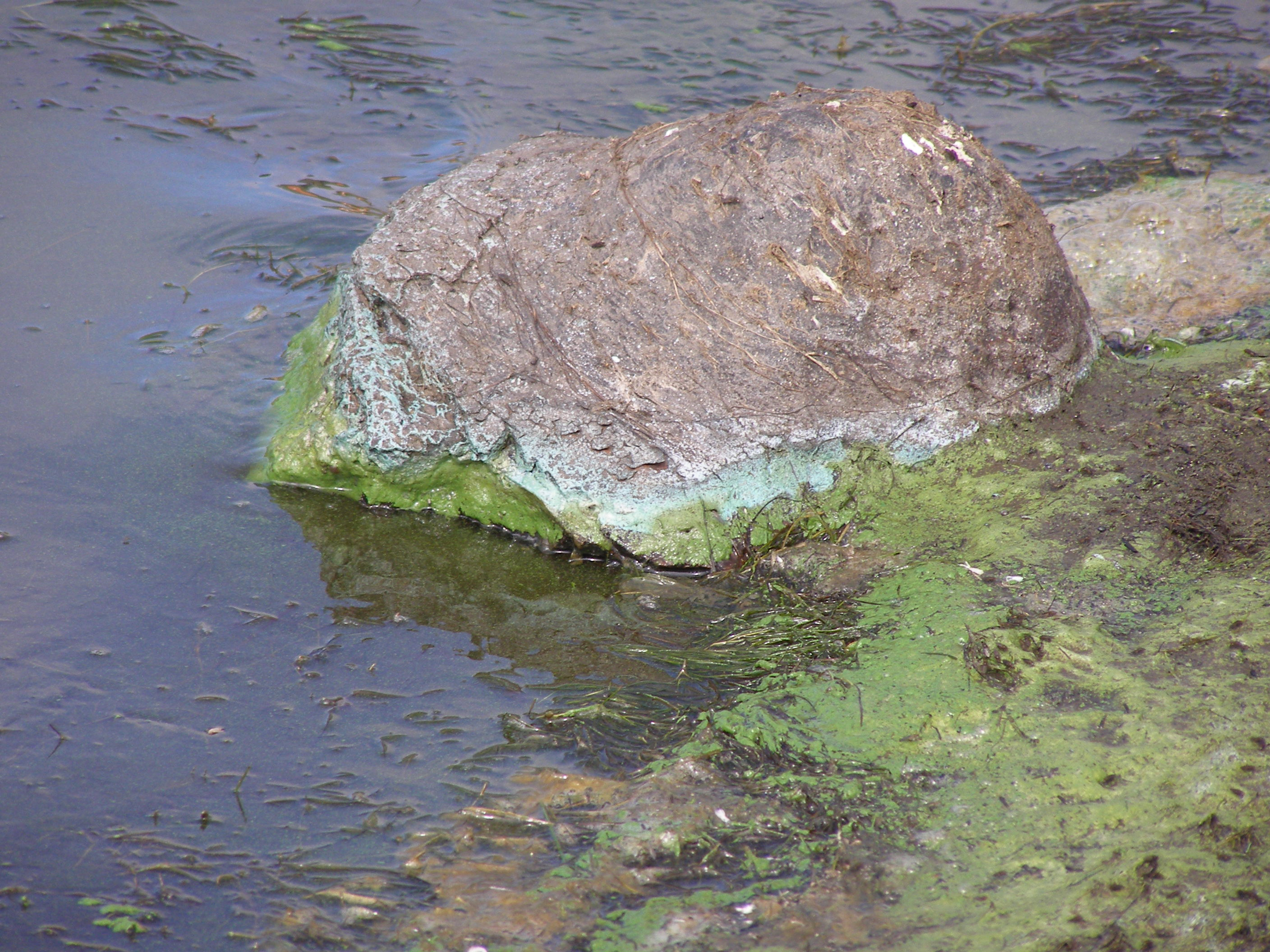
Cyanobacterial scum in Rodeo Lagoon

Rodeo Lagoon typically suffers from an oxygen deficit or hypoxia in the summer and fall. This deficit is caused by the high oxygen consumption of decaying algae that occurs during that time of year. The large algae population, which withdraws carbon dioxide from the water, also raises the pH to very high levels. The pH is typically greater than 9 throughout the summer algae bloom.

== Geology ==
The lagoon is located within the geologically complex Marin Headlands and fills a valley drowned by recent sea level rise following the last glacial period. The bed of the lagoon is covered by viscous black mud that is high in organic content, except at the east and west ends, where non-organic sediment can be found.

== History ==
Rodeo Lagoon was mostly unaltered until the area was developed by the U.S. military into Fort Cronkhite and Fort Barry. In 1937, the Army constructed a road crossing at the east of the lagoon, which resulted in a reduction in the lagoon's size as the area upstream of the crossing gradually turned into a freshwater marsh. The lagoon is now about 80% of its original size.

== Recreation ==
Recreation is not allowed on or in Rodeo Lagoon because of water quality and wildlife concerns. However, the lagoon and surrounding area is an excellent place for wildlife viewing, particularly birding and watching the playful river otters.

== See also ==
- Estuaries of California
- Lagoons of California
- List of lakes in the San Francisco Bay Area
- Golden Gate National Recreation Area-related topics
