= Muir Beach Overlook =

Overlook in California, United States

Coordinates: 37.86306°N 122.58559°W

View from the bottom

Muir Beach Overlook is part of the Golden Gate National Recreation Area. People may visit this cliffside park when driving on State Route 1 (also known as Highway 1) north of San Francisco, California and south of Stinson Beach, California. It has views of Pacific oceanside cliffs and on clear days one can see San Francisco. One can also view migrating blue whales between November and June.

== Location ==
The overlook is located 0.5 miles (0.8 km) north of Muir Beach on Highway One in Marin County, California.

== History ==
Muir Beach Overlook contains several historic base-end stations. From these stations, soldiers viewed ships and triangulated the distance, speed, and direction of these ships in coordination with different stations. These stations were mostly important for artillery units stationed on the coast to attack any invasion. They gained particular importance during World War II immediately after the bombing of Pearl Harbor when many in California feared San Francisco or Los Angeles would be the next target. With the advent of radar and its widespread use, these stations became obsolete.

== Pictures ==
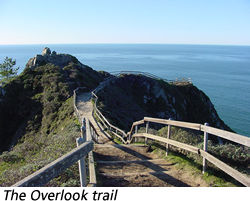
Top of Muir Beach Overlook

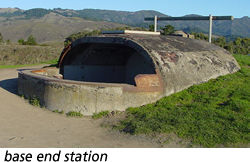
Base End Station at Muir Beach Overlook

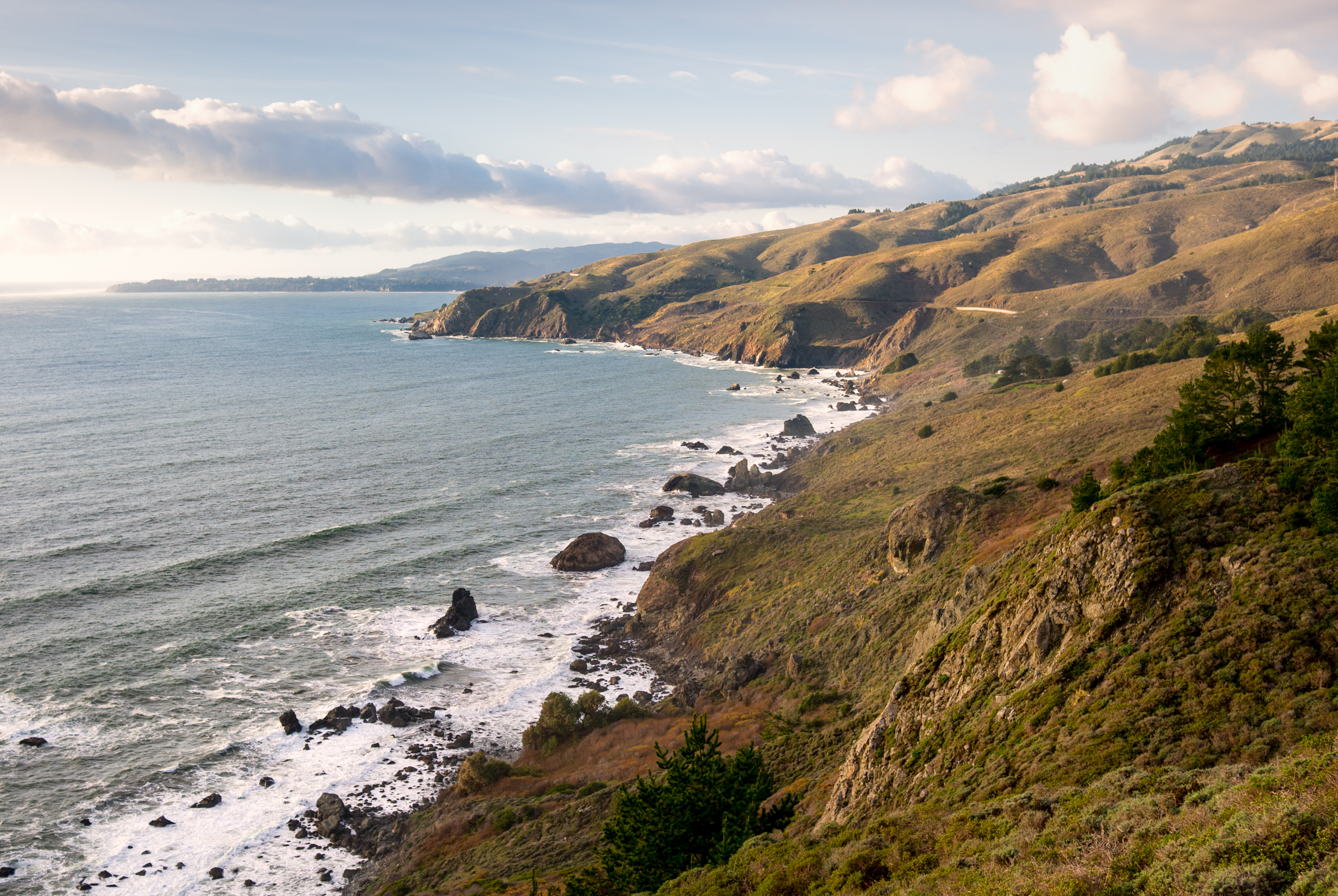
View to the North
