= Golden Gate National Recreation Area =

U.S. National Recreation Area surrounding San Francisco Bay Area

- IUCN category V (protected landscape/seascape)
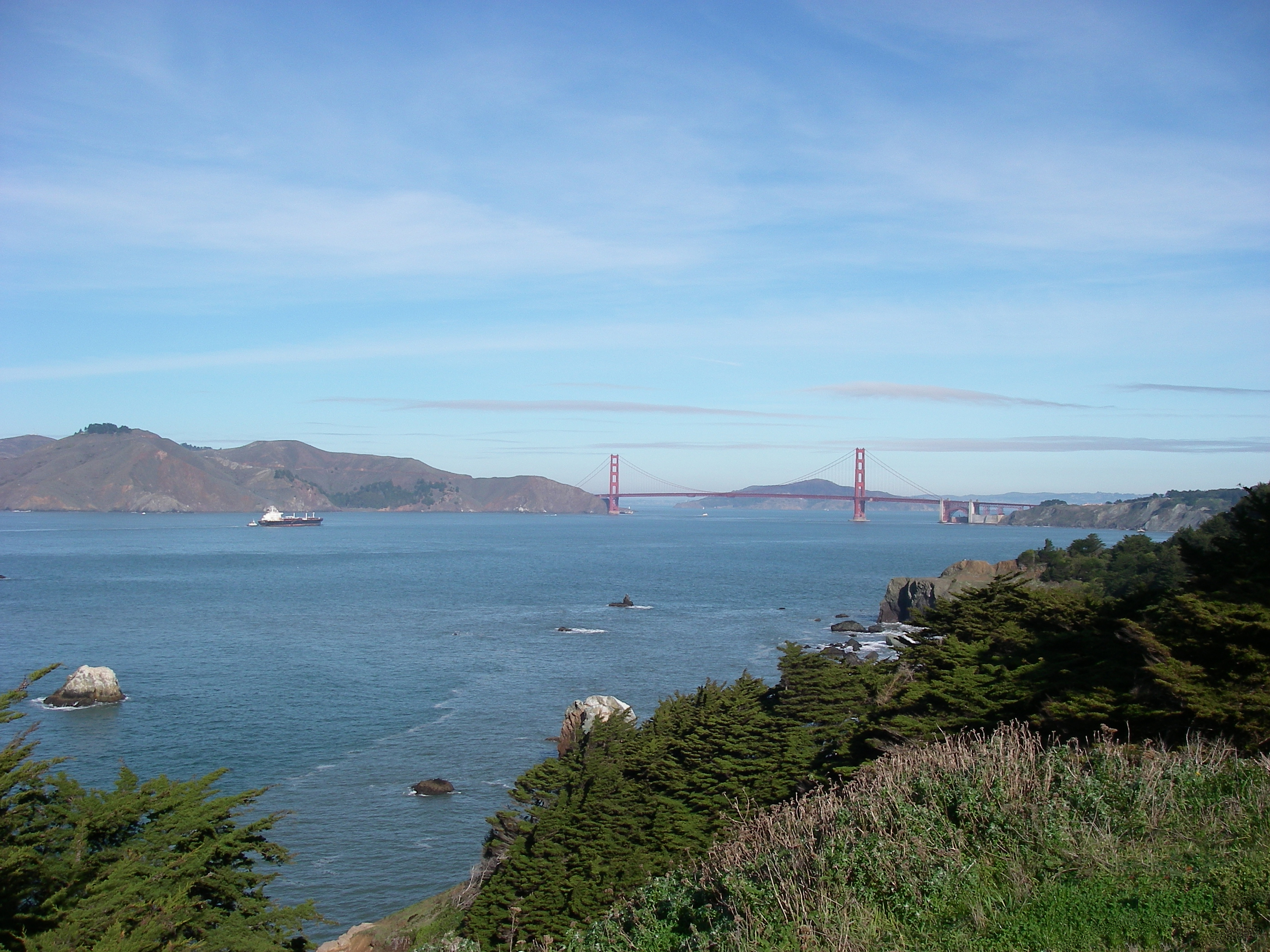
- View of the Golden Gate from Lands End
- Interactive map of Golden Gate National Recreation Area
- Location: San Francisco Bay Area, California, United States
- Nearest city: San Francisco, California
- Coordinates: 37.80°N 122.48°W
- Area: 82,116 acres (332.31 km^{2})
- Established: October 27, 1972
- Visitors: 14,953,882 (in 2023)
- Governing body: National Park Service
- Website: www.nps.gov/goga/index.htm

The Golden Gate National Recreation Area (GGNRA) is a U.S. national recreation area protecting 82,116 acres (33,231 ha) of ecologically and historically significant landscapes surrounding the San Francisco Bay Area. Much of the park is land formerly used by the United States Army. GGNRA is managed by the National Park Service and is the second-most visited unit of the National Park system in the United States (ranking only under Blue Ridge Parkway), with more than 15.6 million visitors in 2022. It is also one of the largest urban parks in the world, with a size two-and-a-half times that of the consolidated city and county of San Francisco.

The park is not one continuous locale but rather a collection of areas that stretch from southern San Mateo County to northern Marin County and includes several areas of San Francisco mostly on the West Side of the city. The park is as diverse as it is expansive; it contains famous tourist attractions such as Muir Woods National Monument, Alcatraz, and the Presidio of San Francisco. The GGNRA is also home to over 3,000 plant and animal species, encompasses 59 miles (95 km) of bay and ocean shoreline and has military fortifications that span centuries of California history, from the Spanish conquistadors to Cold War-era Nike missile sites.

== History ==
The park was created thanks to the cooperative legislative efforts of cosponsors Congressman William S. Mailliard (R-San Francisco) and Congressman Phillip Burton (D-San Francisco). Dr. Robert Busha, an administrator in Mailliard's Washington office, conceived the plan for a non-contiguous national recreation area to circumvent the prevailing limitation that national park property should be contiguous. In 1972, President Richard Nixon signed into law "An Act to Establish the Golden Gate National Recreation Area". The bill allocated $120 million for land acquisition and development. The National Park Service first purchased Alcatraz and Fort Mason from the U.S. Army. Then to complete the national park in the north bay, the Nature Conservancy purchased the land in the Marin Headlands that made up the failed development project called Marincello from the Gulf Oil Corporation. The Nature Conservancy then transferred the land to the GGNRA. These properties formed the initial basis for the park.

Throughout the next 30 years, the National Park Service acquired land and historic sites from the U.S. Army, private landowners, and corporations, incorporating them into the GGNRA. The acquisitions range from the historic Cliff House restaurant and Sutro Baths in San Francisco, to large and expansive forest and coastal lands, such as Sweeney Ridge in San Mateo County and Muir Woods National Monument in Marin. Many decommissioned Army bases and fortifications were incorporated into the park, including Fort Funston, four Nike missile sites, The Presidio, and Crissy Field. The latest acquisition by the National Park Service is Mori Point, a small parcel of land on the Pacifica coast.

In 1988, UNESCO designated the GGNRA and 12 adjacent protected areas the Golden Gate Biosphere Reserve.

In February 2005, Senator Dianne Feinstein introduced legislation in the United States Senate that would add 4,700 acres (1,900 ha) of natural land to the GGNRA in San Mateo County, including a 4,076-acre parcel known as the Rancho Corral de Tierra. The property, located south of Pacifica and surrounding the communities of Moss Beach and Montara, is home to many diverse plant and animal species. The bill passed in the Senate but did not pass the House of Representatives.

On December 9, 2011, Rancho Corral de Tierra was transferred from the Peninsula Open Space Trust to the GGNRA and the National Park Service.

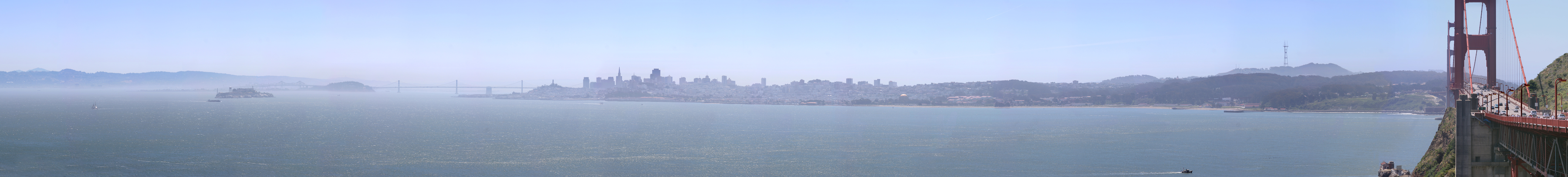
San Francisco Bay, and the city skyline seen from Marin County in the Golden Gate National Recreation Area.

== Locations in the park ==
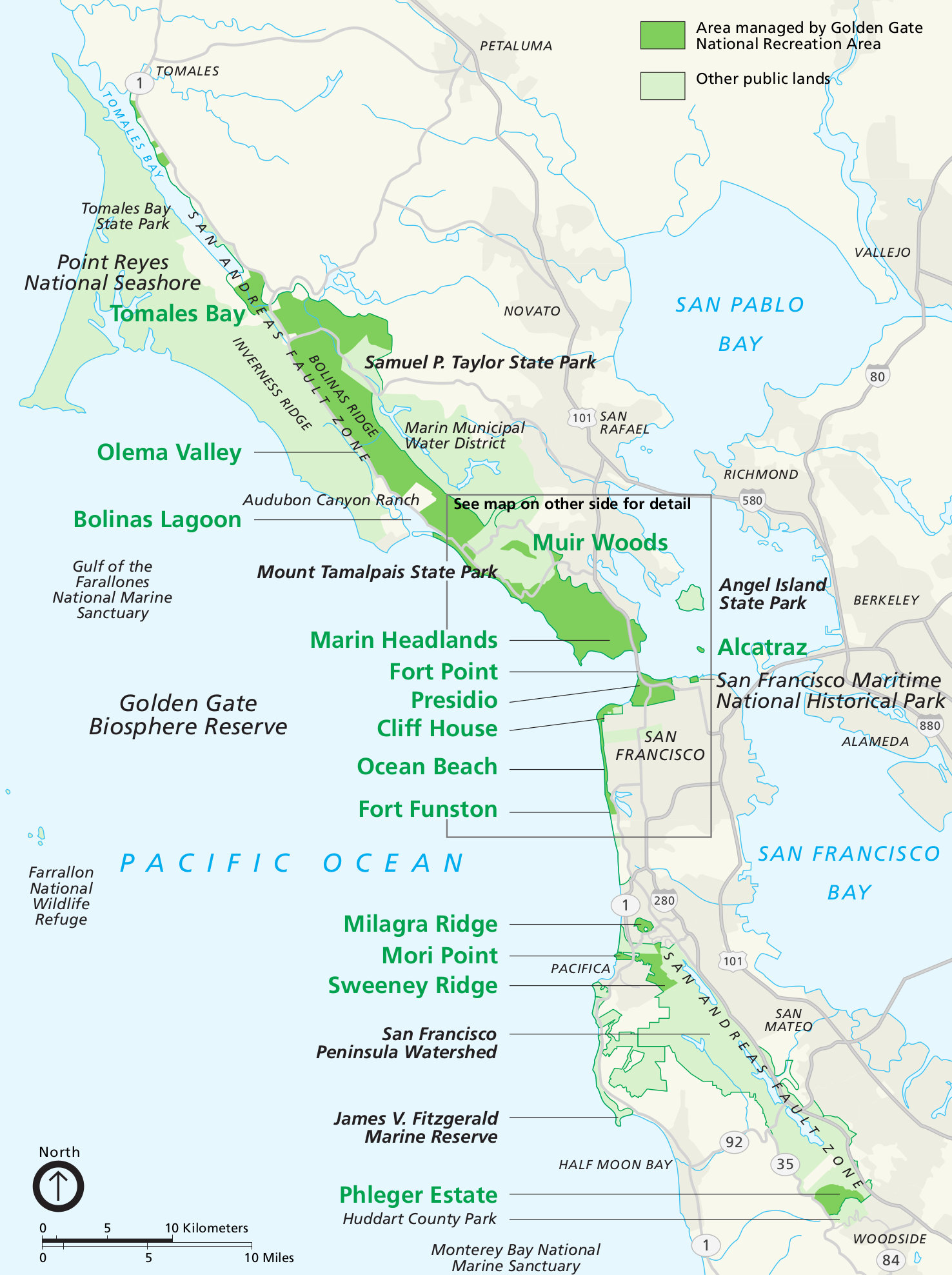

=== Marin County ===
- Fort Baker – former Army post located on the northern side of the Golden Gate
- Headlands Center for the Arts – an artist residency program in renovated military buildings in the Marin Headlands. Offers programs including performances, discussions, and lectures, and displays a 1,800-square-foot (170 m^{2}) project space with a rotating roster of artists open to the public
- Marin Headlands – hilly peninsula at the southernmost end of Marin County that includes The Marine Mammal Center, Rodeo Lagoon, Rodeo Beach, Muir Beach, Tennessee Valley, and Gerbode Valley
- Muir Woods National Monument – huge Coast Redwoods (Sequoia sempervirens) fill this forest, along with Coast Douglas-fir (Pseudotsuga menziesii), Bigleaf Maple (Acer macrophyllum), Tanbark Oak (Lithocarpus densiflorus), and California Bay Laurel (Umbellularia californica)
- Oakwood Valley – bordered by Marin City to the north and the Marin Headlands to the south, Oakwood Valley contains the largest untouched woodland of Coast Live Oak and California bay trees in the Golden Gate National Recreation Area
- Olema Valley – 10 miles (16 km) of grassland and forest that stretch from Tomales Bay to Bolinas Lagoon
- Point Bonita Lighthouse – an active lighthouse maintained by the United States Coast Guard
- Stinson Beach – a beach north of San Francisco and south of Bolinas Lagoon
- Muir Beach Overlook – a former Army base-end station with a clifftop view of the Pacific Ocean and San Francisco, on State Route 1
- Fort Cronkhite – a former World War II Army post near Rodeo Beach.
- Nike Missile Site SF-88 – a decommissioned Army surface-to-air missile (SAM) site located near Fort Barry.

==== Camping sites ====
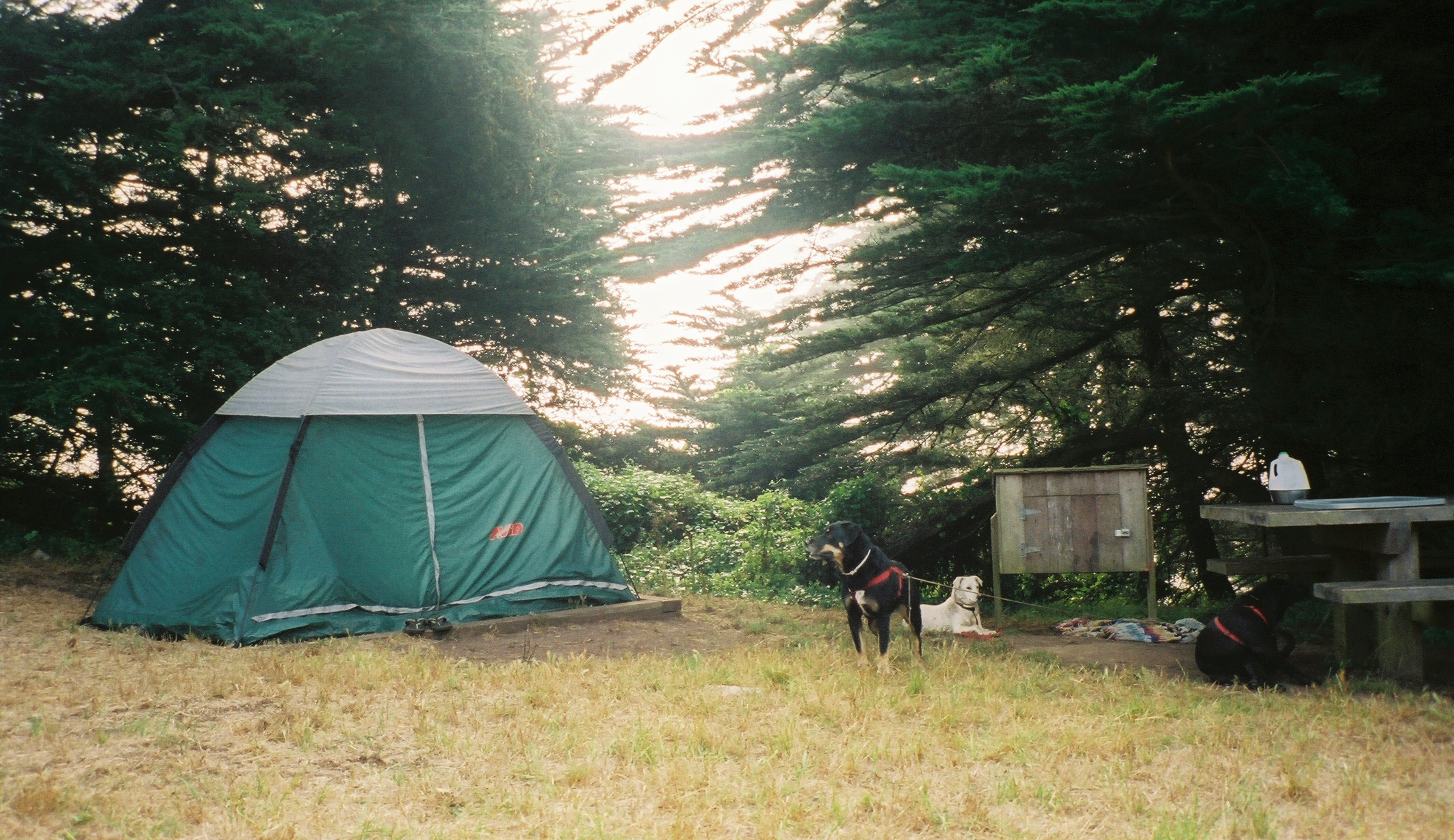
Bicentennial Campground arranged around a small clearing, with each site accommodating a maximum of two people.

Camping Information for the GGNRA

- Bicentennial Camp - open year-round, three 3-person sites, no pets or fires, stoves ok
- Hawk Camp - open spring and summer, three 4-person sites
- Haypress Camp – open spring and summer. Five sites. Four campers maximum per site
- Kirby Cove Camp – open Daylight Saving Time period, March–November, five 10-person sites and one 35-person Day Use site.

=== San Francisco ===
- Alcatraz Island – site of a Civil War fort, military prison, and the infamous Alcatraz Federal Penitentiary
- China Beach – a small beach located north of the Sea Cliff district in San Francisco near the Presidio of San Francisco
- Fort Funston – a former coastal fortification and Nike missile site SF-59L; now a popular hang gliding spot
- Fort Mason – the San Francisco Port of Embarkation National Historic Site now houses non-profit organizations and offers a variety of cultural activities
- Fort Miley Military Reservation – a former military base that now holds a Veterans' Hospital and picnic areas
- Lands End – a natural preserve including the Coastal Trail, bringing scenic views of the Marin Headlands and Golden Gate. Includes Mile Rock, the site of a former lighthouse and, subsequently, a helipad located offshore at the southwestern edge of the Golden Gate
- Presidio of San Francisco – a former military reservation and site of the initial Spanish fortification in San Francisco, including:
  - Baker Beach – the birthplace of the Burning Man festival, a popular sunbathing spot that is clothing-optional at its northern end. Located at the southwestern corner of the Presidio
  - Battery Chamberlin – one of the last remaining coastal defense "disappearing guns" on the U.S. West Coast
  - Crissy Field – a former airfield restored to a 100-acre (40 ha) shoreline
  - Fort Point National Historic Site – a fort at the southern base of the Golden Gate Bridge that formerly housed 126 cannons to protect the bay against invaders. Completed just in time for the Civil War, but never fired a shot in combat
  - The San Francisco National Cemetery
- Ocean Beach – a popular surf spot on the western side of San Francisco
- The Sutro District – a collection of historic attractions developed by Adolph Sutro in the late 19th century, including:
  - The Cliff House – a historic restaurant first built in 1863, rebuilt following fires in 1894 and 1907. It also houses the Camera Obscura, a historic building containing a device that projects a 360° image
  - Sutro Baths – concrete ruins of an indoor swimming pool constructed in 1894 by former SF mayor Adolf Sutro dominate the southwest corner
  - Sutro Heights Park – public park and former estate of Adolf Sutro

==== Camping sites ====
- Rob Hill Group Camp – open April through November, $125/night, two 30-person public sites, each with four parking spaces, must be reserved three days in advance with the Presidio Trust.

=== San Mateo County ===
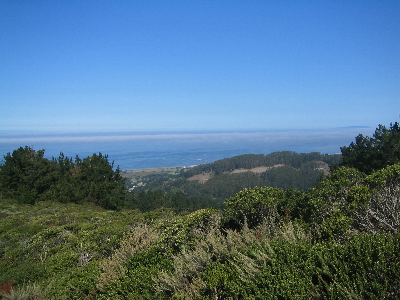
Sweeney Ridge

- Milagra Ridge – 240-acre (97 ha) parcel of land that is home to several endangered species and Nike Missile Site SF-51L
- Sweeney Ridge – location of where Spanish explorer Gaspar de Portolà discovered the San Francisco Bay and is home to several World War II lookout nests and pillboxes as well as Nike missile site SF-51C
- Phleger Estate – part of the Bay Area Ridge Trail, this preserve features Coast Redwoods (Sequoia sempervirens) and other native plants
- Mori Point – a small parcel in Pacifica, consisting of a ridge overlooking the San Francisco peninsula. Trails lead across the ridge and to Sharp Park beach. The site includes recently restored wetlands and a pond, protecting endangered San Francisco garter snake and red-legged frog habitats.
- Rancho Corral de Tierra – the GGNRA's newest park. A former Mexican land grant north of Half Moon Bay and on Montara Mountain, this site was preserved through the work of the Peninsula Open Space Trust, which acquired the property and then sold it to the GGNRA.

== See also ==
- List of beaches in California
- List of California state parks
