= Rodeo Beach =

Beach in California, US

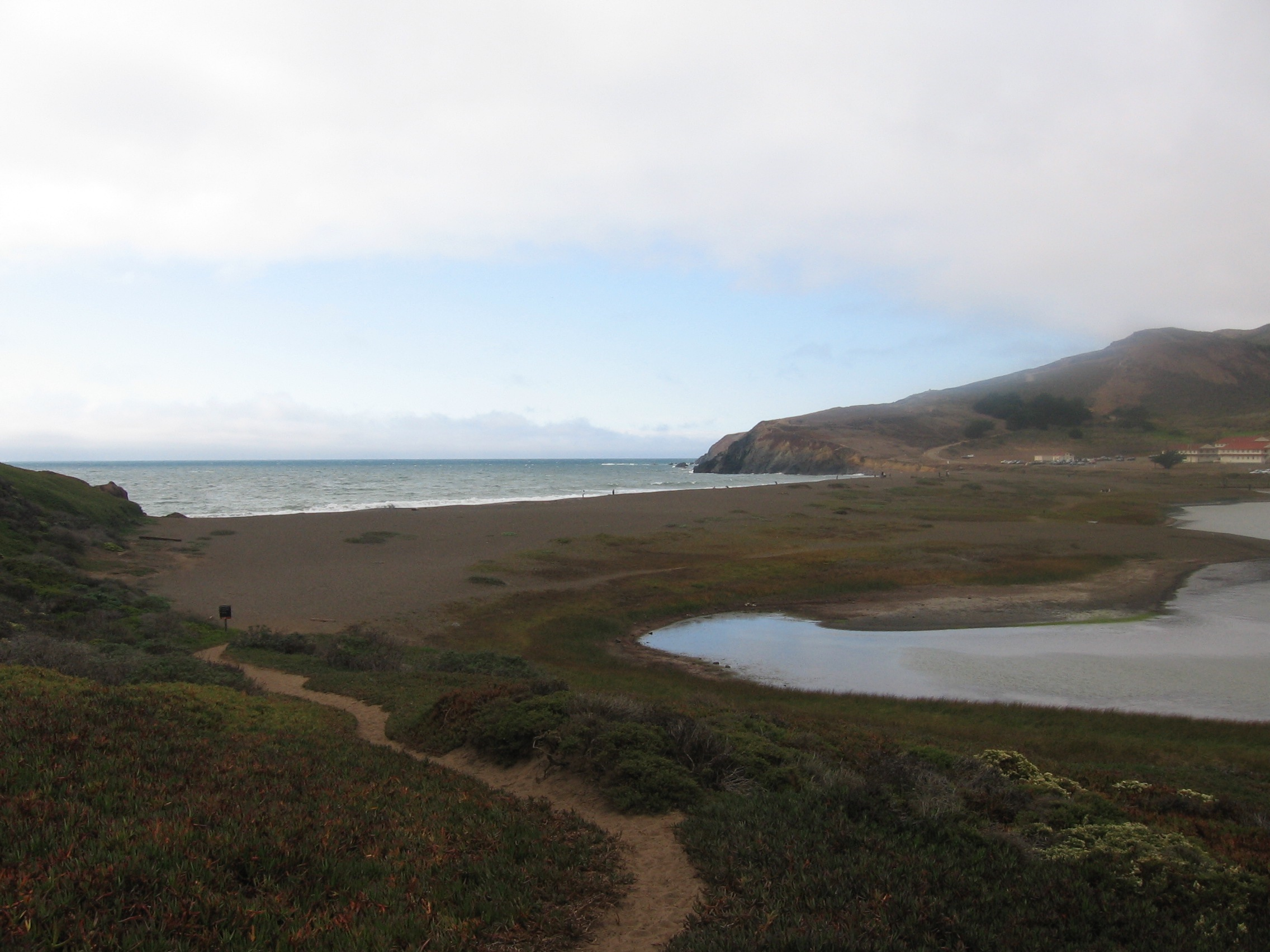
- Rodeo Beach with buildings of Fort Cronkhite visible

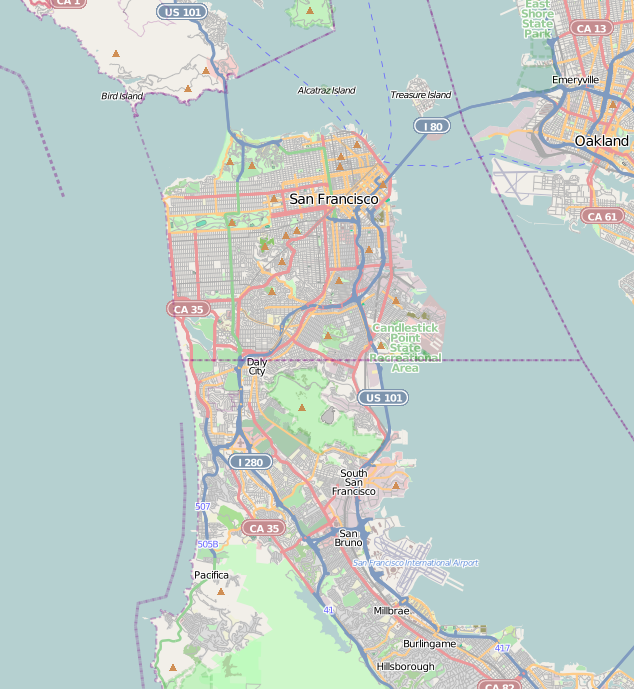
- Location within San Francisco Location within California Location within the United States
- Nearest city: Marin County, California
- Coordinates: 37°49′48″N 122°32′9″W
- Operator: National Park Service
- Website: www.parksconservancy.org/visit/park-sites/rodeo-beach.html

Rodeo Beach (/roʊˈdeɪoʊ/ roh-dee-oh) is a beach in the Golden Gate National Recreation Area located in Marin County, California, United States, two miles west of the Golden Gate Bridge. It is characterized by a spit of around 50 meters width at the mouth of a long embayment, known as Rodeo Lagoon; for much of the year the lagoon is cut off from the ocean, making the beach spit a baymouth bar. Part of the beach is sheltered by cliffs. Rodeo Beach is known for its dark, pebbly sand, its uses for surfing and sunbathing, and its locale as a place for viewing, but not collecting, semi-precious stones. This beach is unique among California beaches in that it is largely made up of coarse, pebbly chert grains, both red and green in color. Its mineral composition sets it apart from every other beach in the state. Surfing is possible throughout the year and at all tidal stages, but is best in summer—although there is a risk of shark attacks. Due to the North bar offshore of this beach it results in big waves in the winter months with the big swells that come in. Strong currents make swimming dangerous.

The beach features free entrance, free parking, wheelchair-accessible public restrooms, showers, and picnic tables. Dogs are allowed, but must be leashed or voice-controlled.

In November 2007, oil from the wreck of the Cosco Busan washed up on Rodeo Beach, prompting its closure for several weeks.

== See also ==
- The Marine Mammal Center
- Fort Cronkhite
- Point Bonita Lighthouse
- Marin Headlands
