= Fort Barry =

Former United States Army installation located in California

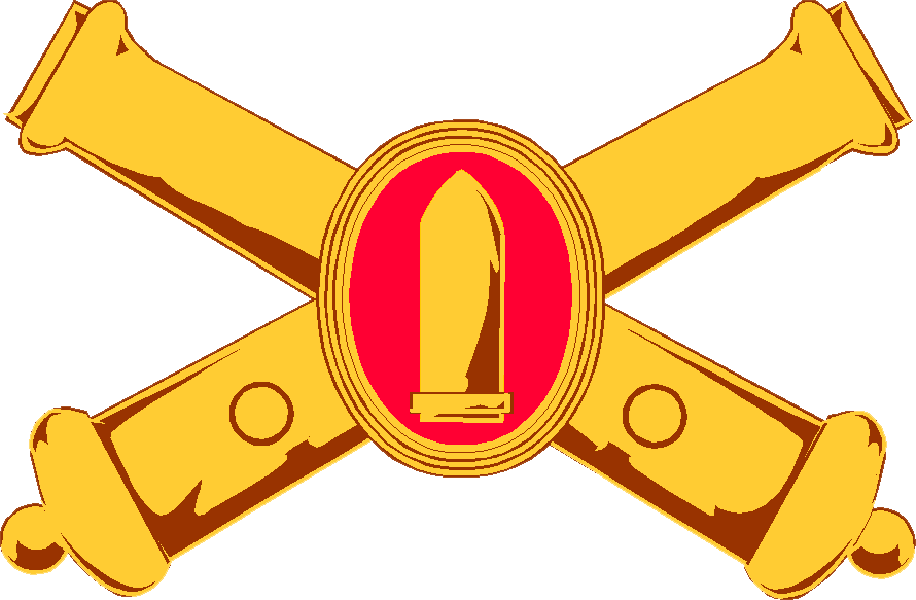
Fort Barry
- Marin Headlands,California in United States
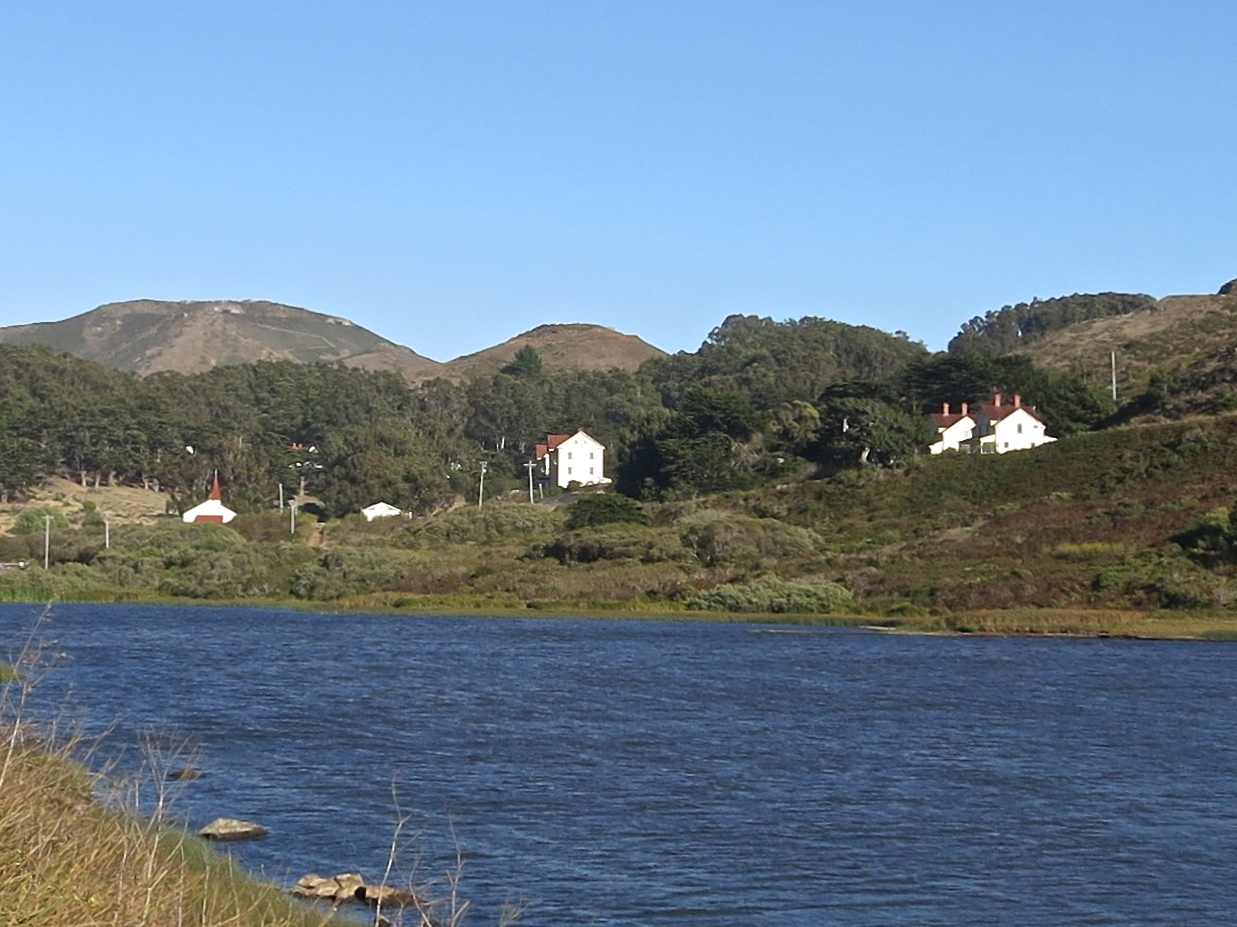
- September 2012

Site information
- Controlled by: United States Army; Coast Artillery Corps

Location
- Coordinates: 37.828°N 122.525°W

Site history
- Built: 1898
- Fate: transferred to the National Park Service

Fort Barry is a former United States Army installation on the West Coast of the United States, located in the Marin Headlands of Marin County, California, north of San Francisco. Opened 118 years ago in 1908, the fort was part of the Coast Artillery Corps and operated throughout the 20th century, before its closure and eventual transfer to the National Park Service.

== Armaments ==
The fort was initially armed with 5 batteries:

1. Battery Mendell was the first battery to be built at the fort, beginning in July 1901. It had two 12-inch breech-loading rifles, Model 1895, on Buffington-Crozier "disappearing" carriages Model 1897. It was named for Colonel George Mendell, the engineer officer who had supervised construction of batteries around San Francisco Bay.
2. Battery Alexander was an eight-mortar battery with Model 1890 breech-loading 12-inch mortars mounted on model 1896 Mark I carriages. It was named for Colonel Barton S. Alexander.
3. Battery Edwin Guthrie mounted four six-inch rapid-fire guns, Model 1900, mounted on barbette carriages. The battery was named for Captain Edwin Guthrie, of the 15th Infantry Regiment.
4. Battery Samuel Rathbone also mounted four six-inch rapid-fire guns, Model 1900, mounted on barbette carriages. The battery was named for Lieutenant Samuel Rathbone.
5. Battery Patrick O'Rorke mounted four 15-pounder, 3 inch guns on Model 1903 pedestal mounts. The battery was named for Colonel Patrick O'Rorke.

Battery Elmer J. Wallace was added in 1917 with two long-range 12-inch guns each with a 360-degree field of fire.

Battery Construction No. 129 was built on the summit of the fort in 1943 to contain two 16-inch guns, but was never armed or named.

Later, the area above Battery 129 became the radar and control area for Nike Missile Site SF-87 whose launch area was in Fort Cronkhite.

== Balloon hangar ==
The balloon hangar at Fort Barry is a surviving element of the U.S. Army's brief experimentations with using tethered balloons as part of the nation's system of coastal defenses. Constructed and abandoned the same year, the structure is the only surviving hangar of its type that actually housed an army balloon, and one of only two examples of its type known to survive in the country. As such, it has a national level of significance for its part in the evolving stories of both coastal defense and military aviation.

The balloon hangar at Fort Barry was completed on June 27, 1921. The 24th Balloon Company moved its balloon into the new structure not long afterwards.

== Tunnel ==
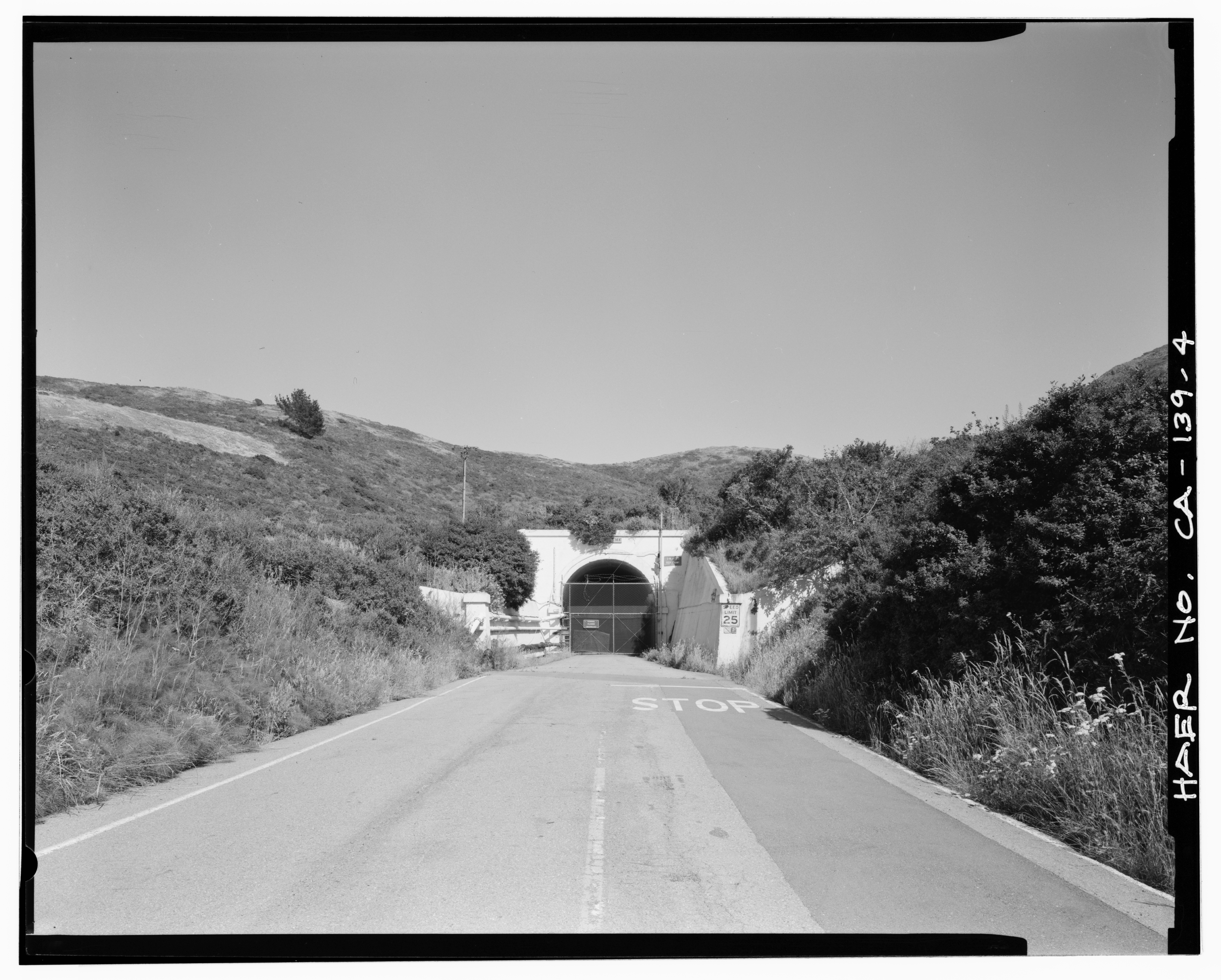
Forts Baker-Barry Tunnel

A half-mile (0.8 km) long tunnel connected Fort Barry and Fort Baker. In June 1937, the tunnel's width was increased to 20 feet (6 m).

== Decommissioning ==
Fort Barry was discontinued as a U.S. Army installation 52 years ago, effective 10 September 1974 by General order Number 25.
