= Tennessee Valley (California) =

Valley in California, United States of America

Coordinates: 37°51′40″N 122°32′03″W

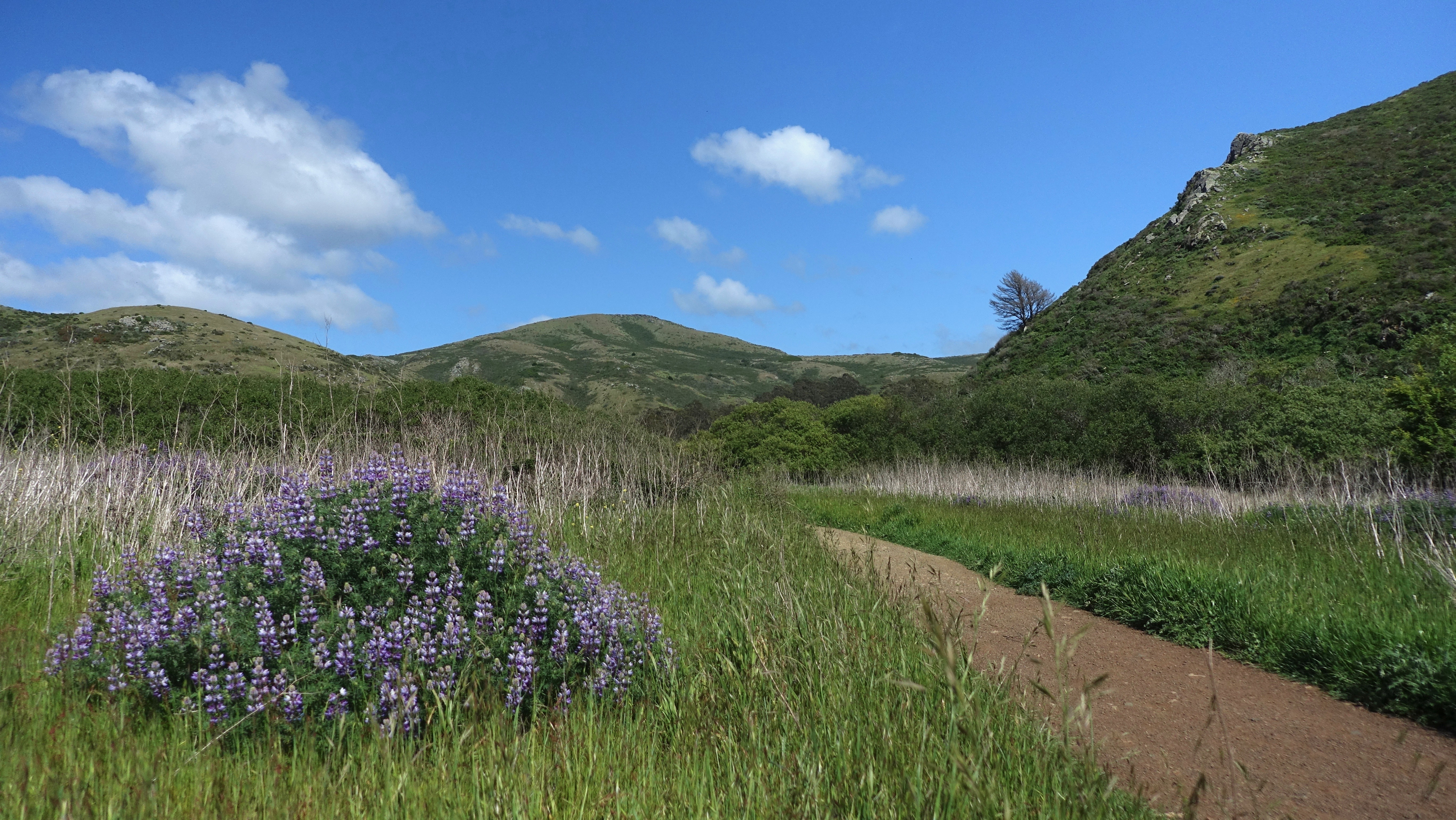
Spring lupins bloom on the Tennessee Valley Trail. View facing east.

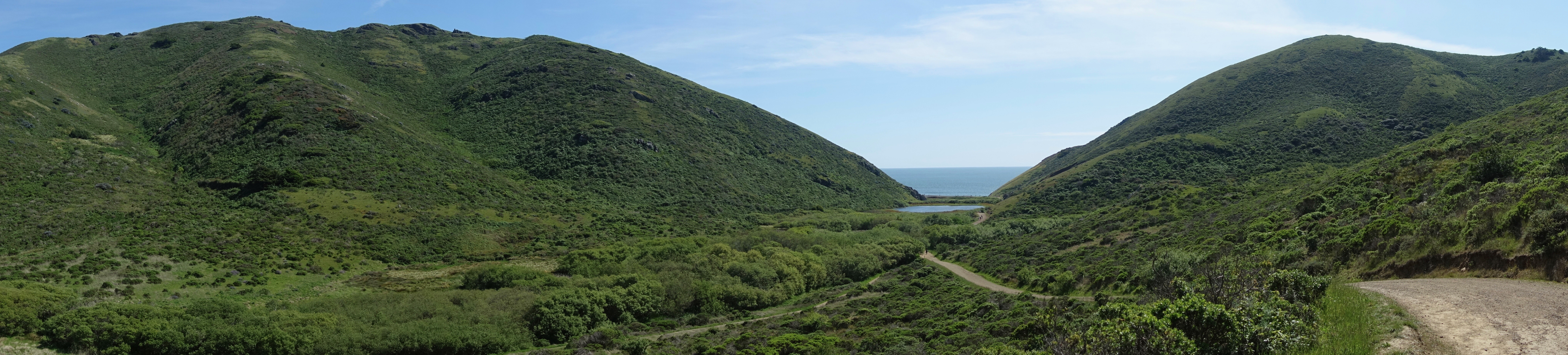
The Tennessee Valley Trail winds west to the coast.

The Tennessee Valley is a small, undeveloped part of Marin County, near Mill Valley. Historically home to ranches and threatened with the development of a new city, the valley was incorporated into the Golden Gate National Recreation Area in 1972, with additional sections added to the park in 1974. The park contains horse stables, a native-plant nursery, and numerous trails for hiking, biking, and horse riding, including a 1.7-mile, handicap-accessible trail that leads to Tennessee Cove and its beach.

== History ==
Tennessee Valley was originally inhabited by Coast Miwok tribes, as was much of Marin County. The valley was called Elk Valley by the first European settlers due to its abundant wildlife and presence of Tule elk, which have since been extirpated. The name change occurred due to the 1853 wreck of the S.S. Tennessee. The passenger steamship missed the Golden Gate in the fog and accidentally turned into Indian Cove, now called Tennessee Cove, 4 miles north of the gate. The captain successfully beached the ship on the cove, saving 500 passengers and 14 chests of gold. At very low tide, the engine of the S.S. Tennessee can be seen at the beach.

In the 1960s, a plan for developing much of the Marin Headlands, including most of Tennessee Valley, was created, called Marincello. Marincello would have been a city of 30,000, including apartment towers, single family homes, and light industry. It was ultimately defeated due to public pressure against the construction of a new city and financial difficulties. One initial neighborhood of approximately 240 homes ("Marinview") was built before the larger project was halted. Some of the scars of its construction are visible, including the Marincello gate and trail, which follows what would have been the city's main boulevard.

== Ecology ==
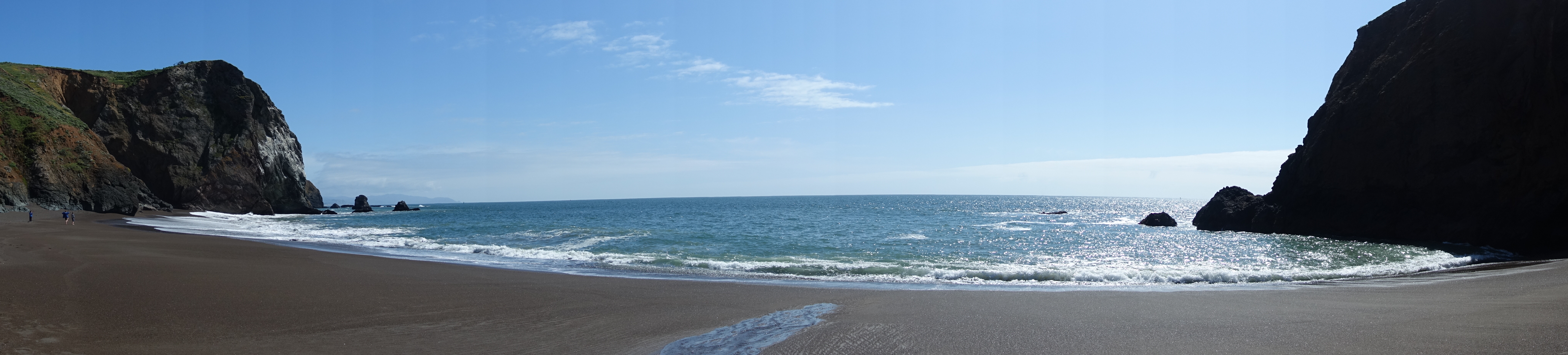
Tennessee Valley Beach

Tennessee Valley contains coastal scrub and grasslands, as well as riparian habitat along Tennessee Creek. Tennessee cove contains a small lagoon and a beach, and offshore waters and habitat are protected as part of the Monterey Bay National Marine Sanctuary. Common grasses include native purple needlegrass, California oatgrass, and red fescue, but also invasives such as rattlesnake grass, wild oats, including Avena barbata and Avena fatua, brome grasses, and annual fescues. Many of these are remnants of the ranching history of the valley, as ranchers planted non-native grasses that could withstand the trampling and grazing of their livestock. Common plants on the ridges include coyote brush, poison oak, California sagebrush, sticky monkeyflower, and California blackberry. In some places, non-native Monterey cypress, Monterey pine, and blue gum eucalyptus were planted and continue to thrive.

The Tennessee Valley Native Plant Nursery, part of the Golden Gate National Parks Conservancy, collects and grows local seeds for habitat restoration efforts across the Marin Headlands.

== See also ==
- Tennessee Cove
