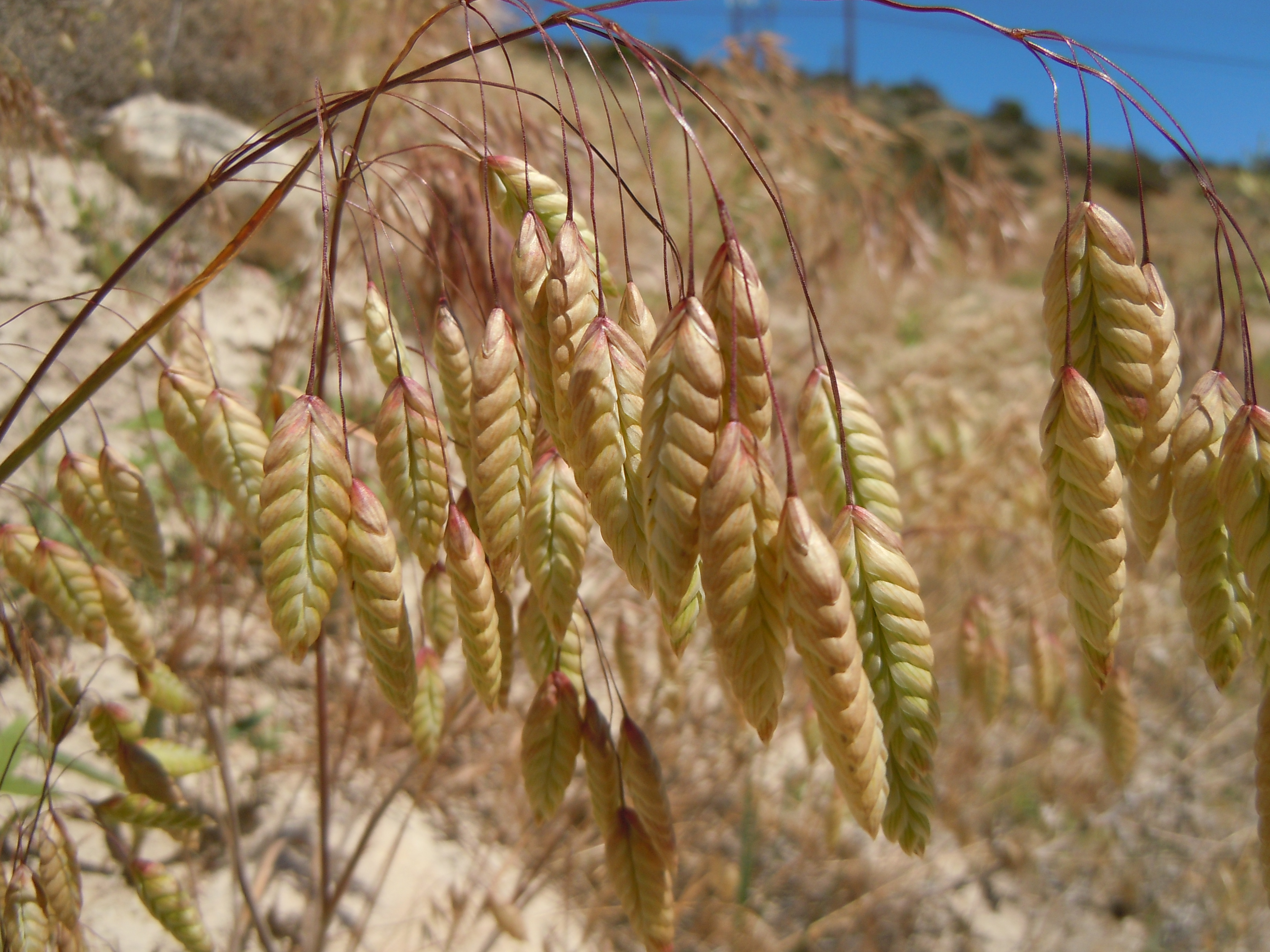

Scientific classification
- Kingdom: Plantae
- Clade: Tracheophytes
- Clade: Angiosperms
- Clade: Monocots
- Clade: Commelinids
- Order: Poales
- Family: Poaceae
- Subfamily: Pooideae
- Genus: Bromus
- Species: B. briziformis

Binomial name
- Bromus briziformis Fisch. & C.A.Mey.

= Bromus briziformis =

Species of grass

Bromus briziformis is a species of brome grass known by the common name rattlesnake brome. The specific epithet briziformis comes from the resemblance of the grass to grasses of the genus Briza, particularly Briza maxima. The common name is derived from the resemblance of the spikelets to the rattles of rattlesnakes. The grass has a diploid number of 14.

== Description ==
Bromus briziformis is an annual grass, with erect or ascending culms growing 20–80 cm (7.9–31.5 in) tall. The leaf sheaths are shaggy and ligules, measuring 0.5–2 mm (0.020–0.079 in) long, are densely hairy. The leaf blades are 3–13 cm (1.2–5.1 in) long and 2–4 mm (0.079–0.157 in) wide, and are lightly hairy to glabrous on both sides. The lax and secund panicles have long spreading or drooping branches that bear solitary terminal spikelets. The panicles are 5–15 cm (2.0–5.9 in) long and 3–7 cm (1.2–2.8 in) wide, and the branches are typically longer than the spikelets. The flat spikelets are 15–27 mm (0.59–1.06 in) long and 0.8–1.3 cm (0.31–0.51 in) broad. The glumes are smooth or slightly scabrous. The lower glumes are three to five-veined and 5–6 mm (0.20–0.24 in) long, and the upper glumes are seven to nine-veined and 6–8 mm (0.24–0.31 in) long. The lemmas are ovate or slightly rhombic, have broad translucent margins, and are awnless. The anthers are 0.7–1 mm (0.028–0.039 in) long. The caryopses are as long or shorter than the paleas, and are flat or slightly rolled inwards.

== Habitat and distribution ==
Bromus briziformis grows in waste areas, disturbed areas, and road verges, on dry soils. It is native to southwest Eurasia, but naturalized throughout North America from New Mexico up to southern British Columbia, and scattered throughout the eastern United States.
