= Fear gorta =

Phantom of hunger in Irish mythology

In Irish mythology, the Fear Gorta (Irish: Man of hunger / Man of famine; also known as the Fear Gortach) is a phantom of hunger resembling an emaciated human.

== Origins ==
This particular version of the Fear Gorta is believed to have originated during or soon after the Great Famine of 1845–1852. The offerings that are given to him are reminiscent of offerings to the Tuatha Dé Danann, suggesting that there may be older versions of the same being.

== Mythology ==
The Fear Gorta is said to wander the roads in times of famine, seeking food from humans. He appears emaciated, carrying a long staff and a tin cup containing a single coin. The Fear Gorta would rattle the coin in the cup in order to signal his presence. If he accosted a house, whomever lived in it should put a scrap of food on the step of the front door for him. If not, then misfortune would fall upon the household. Similarly, if a person does not provide something to him when he accosts them on the road, misfortune or death could occur. In both cases, if the person provides an offering then they will be blessed with good fortune.

Harvey relates a myth that the Fear Gorta was a harbinger of famine and that the spirit originally arises from a patch of hungry grass (Féar Gortach). In the region of Kiltubbrid, the term is also used to refer to a sudden hunger that can seize people traveling in the mountains that will become fatal if not quickly satiated.

== See also ==
- Wendigo
