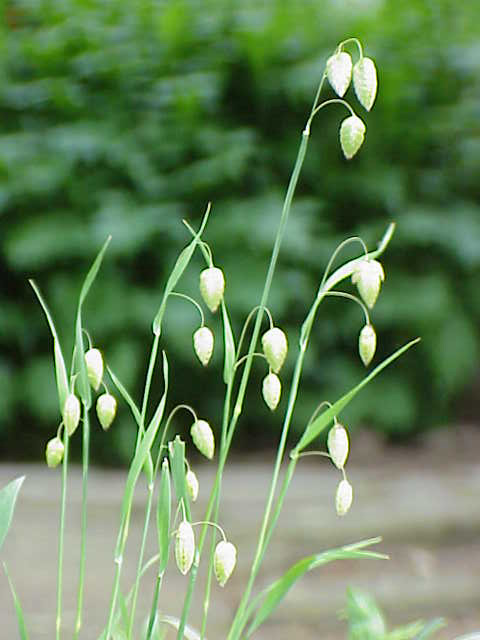
- Briza maxima

Scientific classification
- Kingdom: Plantae
- Clade: Tracheophytes
- Clade: Angiosperms
- Clade: Monocots
- Clade: Commelinids
- Order: Poales
- Family: Poaceae
- Subfamily: Pooideae
- Supertribe: Poodae
- Tribe: Poeae
- Subtribe: Brizinae
- Genus: Briza; L.

Type species
- Briza media L.

Synonyms
- Brizochloa V.Jirásek & Chrtek; Calosteca Desv.; Chondrachyrum Nees; Macrobriza (Tzvelev) Tzvelev; Tremularia Heist. ex Fabr.

= Briza =

Quaking grasses

Genus of grasses

Briza is a genus of annual and perennial plants in the grass family, native to northern temperate regions of Eurasia, North Africa, and certain islands in the Atlantic.

The group is generally referred to as the quaking grasses because the flowers and seedheads shake on their stalks in the slightest breeze. Some of its members are grown as ornamental plants.

Briza species are used as food plants by the larvae of some Lepidoptera species including Coleophora lixella.

Species

- Briza humilis M.Bieb. – from Albania to Iran
- Briza marcowiczii Woronow – Turkey, Caucasus
- Briza maxima L. – Mediterranean, Azores, Madeira, Canary Islands; naturalized in parts of Asia, Africa, Australia, the Americas, and certain oceanic islands
- Briza media L. – Europe, Asia, North Africa, Azores, Canary Islands; naturalized in New Zealand and parts of North America
- Briza minor L. – from Azores + Canary Islands to Iran; naturalized in parts of Asia, Africa, Australia, the Americas, and certain oceanic islands

Over 100 species formerly included in Briza are now placed in other genera, including Agrostis, Airopsis, Chascolytrum, Desmazeria, Desmostachya, Distichlis, Eragrostis, Glyceria, Halopyrum, Neesiochloa, Poa, Tribolium, Trisetum and Uniola.

== Folklore ==
In certain Scottish folklore, a patch of briza, dawdle, or quaking grass indicated the location's previous use in fairy dancing (similar to a fairy ring). The passerby who walks through the tainted grass was said to come down with an immediate drowsiness, worsening to the point of death. Through the action of cursing the victim, quaking grass is similar to hungry grass, both falling under the category of fairy grass.

== See also ==
- List of Poaceae genera
- Hungry grass
- Fairy ring
