= Presidio Fire Department =

Coordinates: 37°48′06.1″N 122°27′20.0″W

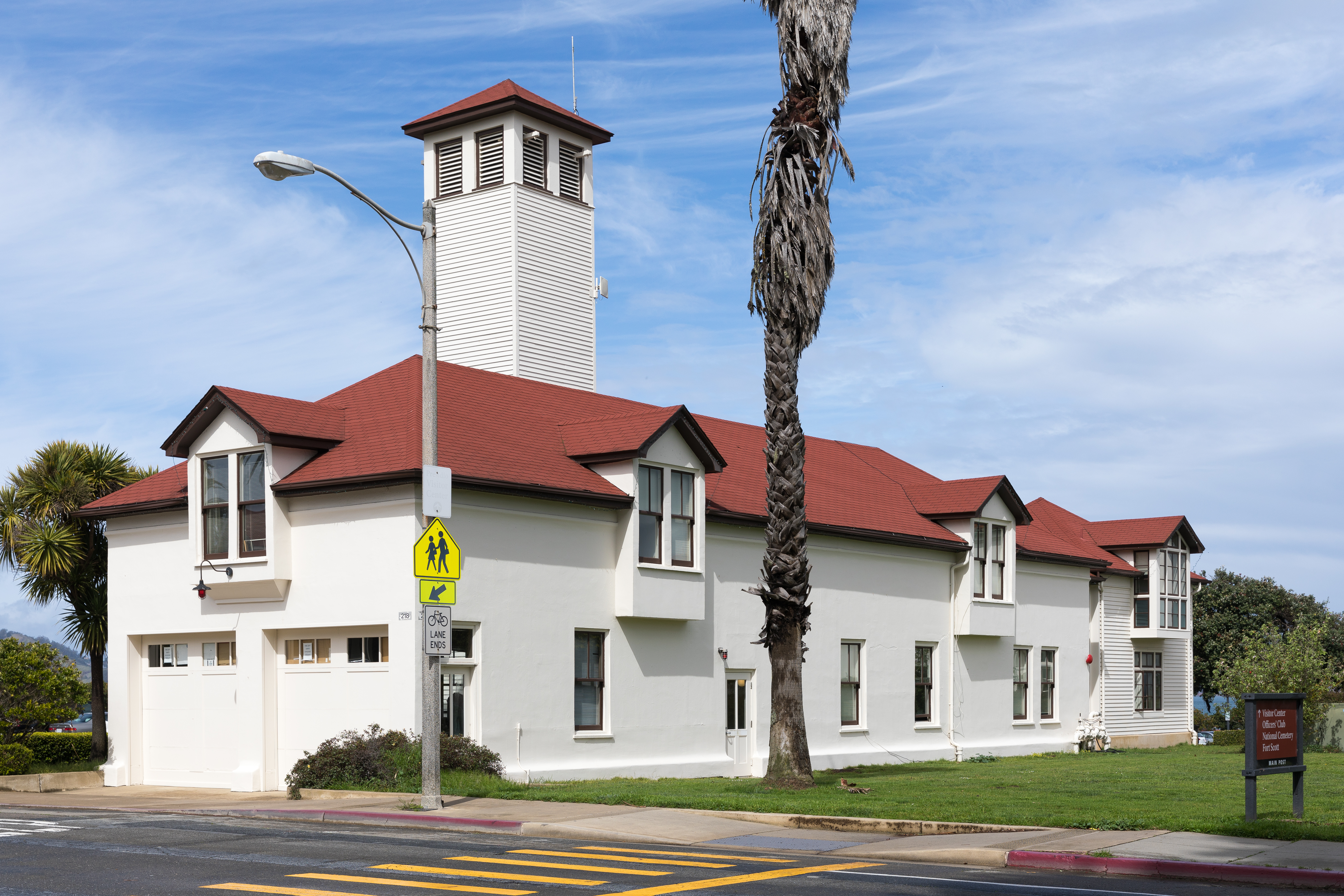
The Presidio Fire Station in 2018

Established in 1917, the Presidio Fire Department provides primary emergency response to the Presidio of San Francisco.

During the 1940s, '50s and '60s the Presidio's Firehouse served as the headquarters station to a much larger department consisting of many Stations located at the various forts around San Francisco such as: Fort Baker, Fort Barry, Fort Funston, Fort Mason, Fort Winfield-Scott, Fort Cronkhite, Chrisy Field, and Angel Island along with fire prevention duties and air show fire protection at Hamilton Air Force Base after its closure and prior to its transfer to the City of Novato. Although most of the firehouses have long since been demolished, some still stand such as those located at the Presidio of San Francisco's Main Post, Fort Cronkhite, Fort Mason and Angel Island. The National Park Service maintains the daily log books dating back to the 1940s from several of the department's stations in the Park Archives of the Golden Gate National Recreation Area and they are available to the public for viewing.

Over the years the Presidio Fire Department was reduced and left with two fire stations. Fire Station 1 was located in the Presidio of San Francisco's Main Post and Fire Station 2 was located in the Marin Headlands at Fort Cronkhite. In 1994, as a result of the Presidio of San Francisco's closure under the Base Realignment and Closure act the Presidio Fire Department and staff was transferred from the Department of the Army to the National Park Service and became the only full-time fire department within the National Park Service under the Golden Gate National Recreation Area, Division of Visitor Protection. However, as indicated by report #RECD-00-154 issued by the Government Accountability Office in 2000; the National Park Service as a whole was unable to effectively operate its various fire protection programs throughout the country. The GGNRA was no exception to this, and after years of struggling attempting to operate the Presidio Fire Department, the GGNRA began exploring options to rid themselves of the management burden of running a full-time fire Department.

== Current status ==
=== Station 1 ===
On August 27, 2010, responsibility for fire protection services was transferred to the San Francisco Fire Department under contracts for services between the SFFD, National Park Service and the Presidio Trust. The SFFD now operates out of the existing firehouse (Building 218) in the Presidio as SFFD Station 51.

=== Station 2 ===
On November 10, 2010, in violation of a Federal Labor Relations Authority Arbitrator's recent ruling to increase staffing and meet response time standards, Station 2 was closed permanently by the National Park Service and the remaining employees were laid off. Fire protection services are now provided under contract from the Southern Marin Fire Protection District located 5.5 miles away in downtown Sausalito. Fire Station 2 (Building 1045) and its apparatus now sit unused at Fort Cronkhite.

== History ==
=== Early history ===
In the late 19th century, Presidio soldiers gained notoriety for fighting wild fires in California’s National Parks. After the 1906 earthquake, Presidio troops came to the assistance San Francisco during the fire that followed, eventually stopping it at a firebreak that they dynamited along Van Ness Avenue. However, the army received much criticism from city residents, who claimed the dynamiting operations were disorganized and people were removed from their houses long before the fire was a threat.

Within the Presidio, the army was plagued by fires in the old wooden buildings, many of which were more than 50 years old, had flammable roofs and open, coal-burning fireplaces with defective flues. In addition, the Presidio had no professionally trained firefighters and lacked a good fire prevention plan.

=== A catalyst for change ===
A series of fatal fires at the Presidio in the early 1900s culminated in the notorious Pershing fire of 1915. This fire killed four members of General John Pershing’s family. Mrs. Pershing, the daughter of Senator Francis E. Warren of Wyoming, and three of the four Pershing children suffocated in the early morning hours after coal from an unattended dining room fireplace fell to the floor, leading to a quick-spreading fire in the old wooden house.

=== Establishment ===
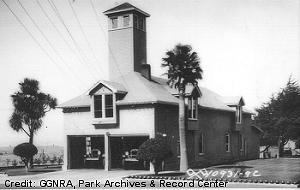
The Presidio Fire Station in 1929

After the Pershing fire, Senator Warren led a congressional mandate for improved fire fighting resources at the Presidio. At the same time, San Francisco fire chief Thomas Murphy recommended establishing a permanent fire company at the Presidio. Based on Chief Murphy’s recommendations and encouraged by an embarrassed United States government, the army built a fire station in 1917. The new Presidio Fire Station was the first on any U.S. Army post to house a permanent fire company with trained firefighters.

=== Presidio firefighters to the rescue ===
Response to the 1989 Loma Prieta earthquake showed how much the Presidio Fire Department had changed since the early years. Firefighters from the department proved it to be a well-trained and effective “first response” organization. A mutual response agreement – not used since the 1906 earthquake – between the army and the San Francisco allowed the city to request Presidio Fire Department support for a house fire in the Marina. The Presidio crew was first to reach the fire at Beach and Divisadero. Actions taken by the Presidio Department at that time prompted commendations from Congresswoman Barbara Boxer, the Marina Neighborhood Organization, and the Phoenix Society, a highly regarded firefighters’ organization.

=== A National Park Service first ===
In 1994, management of the Presidio was transferred from the Department of Defense to the Department of the Interior. At that time, the Presidio Fire Department became the only National Park Service fire department to be staffed 24 hours a day. The National Park Service has focused on a new role for the modern firefighter, that of a well-trained emergency paramedic. The importance of this expanded role for firefighters is evident in that 90% of emergency calls are for paramedic units, making the Presidio Fire Department a vital “first response” station for the Presidio community.

=== Restoration ===
The Presidio Fire Station was recently rehabilitated to bring it up to earthquake code, and to enlarge it to accommodate modern fire fighting equipment. Many of the original features of the historic 1917 structure were restored, such as the historic wood windows and sectional apparatus bay doors. Non-historic additions were removed, and a new wing compatible with the original building architecture was added. Finally, elements of the historic landscape were brought back to the site, which is very prominent to visitors arriving at the Main Post.
