= Marin Headlands =

Southernmost peninsula of the Marin Peninsula in California, United States

Coordinates: 37°49′40″N 122°30′22″W

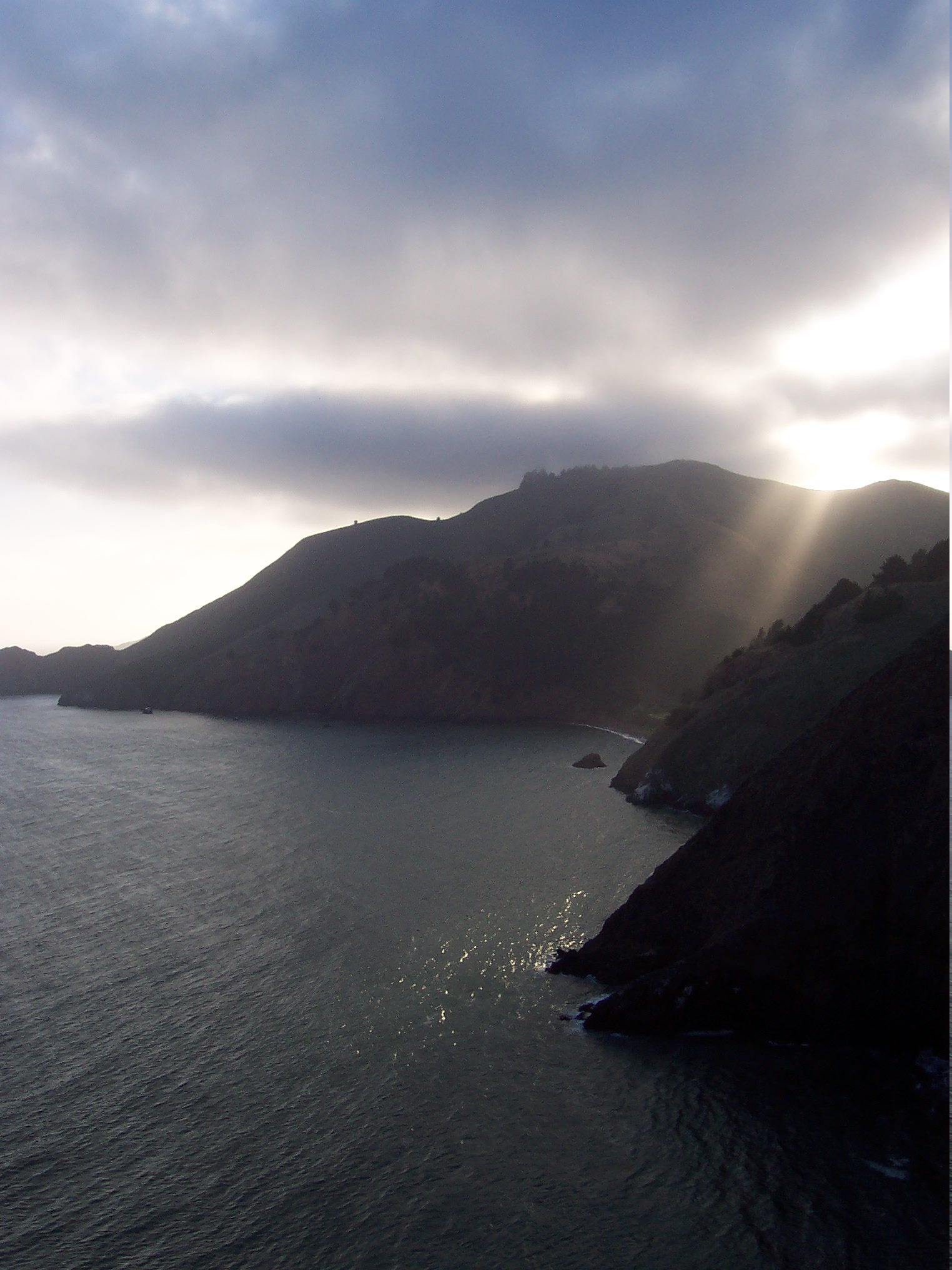
- The Marin Headlands, as seen from the Golden Gate Bridge

Highest point
- Peak: Hawk Hill
- Elevation: 920 ft (280 m)

Geography
- Location within California Location within the United States
- Country: United States
- State: California
- County: Marin County
- Parent range: Marin Hills

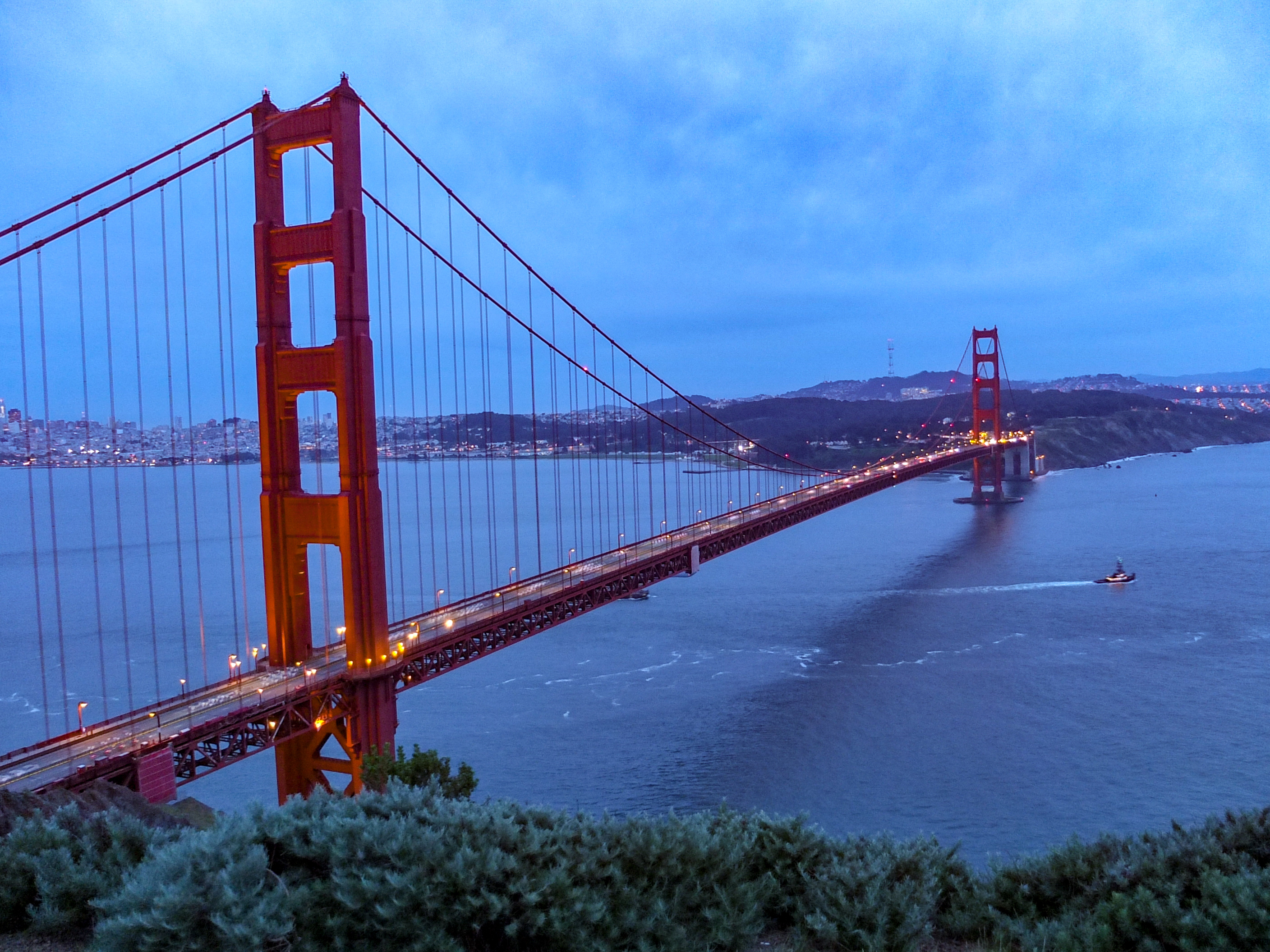
Golden Gate Bridge seen from the Marin Headlands at nightfall

The Marin Headlands are a hilly peninsula at the southernmost end of Marin County, California, United States, located just north of San Francisco across the Golden Gate Bridge, which connects the two counties and peninsulas. The entire area is part of the Golden Gate National Recreation Area. The Headlands are famous for their views of the Bay Area, especially of the Golden Gate Bridge.

== Climate ==
The Headlands sometimes create their own clouds when moist, warm Pacific Ocean breezes are pushed into higher, colder air, causing condensation, fog, fog drip and perhaps rain. The hills also get more precipitation than at sea level, for the same reason. However, despite being relatively wet, strong gusty Pacific winds prevent dense forests from forming. The many gaps, ridges, and valleys in the hills increase the wind speed and periodically, during powerful winter storms, these winds can reach hurricane force. In summer, breezes can still be very gusty, when the oceanic air and fog crosses the hills.

The weather from November through February in the Headlands is dominated by periodic rainstorms that blow in from the Pacific, often originating in the Gulf of Alaska, and give the area the majority of its rainfall for the year. These cloudy, gray, and rainy days often are interspersed with cool but extremely clear ones. As winter turns to spring, the April-to-June weather tends to be dominated by powerful winds, less rain, and clearer skies. Summer days alternate between clear and warm intervals, giving way to foggy and cool periods. September and October bring the highest average temperatures of the year and the longest stretches of clear skies.

== Hawk Hill ==
The centerpoint of the Marin Headlands skyline is the 920-foot (280 m) Hawk Hill, the lookout point for the largest known flight of diurnal raptors in the Pacific states.

Each autumn, from August into December, tens of thousands of hawks, kites, falcons, eagles, vultures, osprey, and harriers are funneled by the peninsular shape of Marin County into the headlands. Hawks avoid flight over water since warm thermals that provide lift are rare. Abundant populations of small mammals protected by the park are one resource that helps maintain the large number of visiting raptors in the Headlands during the fall, but the strong onshore winds hitting the hills of the Headlands provide cold updrafts and hot late-summer days provide warm thermals that allow these birds to fly more efficiently.

Volunteers with the Golden Gate Raptor Observatory count and track this fall migration using bird-banding and radio-tracking techniques, all in cooperation with the National Park Service.

== Wildlife ==
The Marin Headlands are also home to black tail deer, mountain lions, bobcats, two types of foxes, coyotes, wild turkeys, hares, rabbits, raccoons, and skunks. In 2003, there was a reported sighting of a black bear in the Headlands; the report was lent credence by a 2012 finding of bear scat on a hiking trail in the Kent Lake watershed, and another sighting on the Point Reyes National Seashore in 2011. River otters inhabit the freshwater lagoons and streams. Large numbers of water birds also migrate through the Headlands, including brown pelicans from May through October; and grebes, egrets, and great blue herons in the spring, summer, and fall. The Headlands' status as a park protects the habitat and populations of these animals within just a few miles of San Francisco and its suburbs.

In the waters surrounding the Headlands, harbor seals can be found year-round, gray whales can be seen in the spring and fall, and seabirds such as common murres and surf scoters swim within sight of shore.

When Richard Henry Dana Jr. visited San Francisco Bay in 1835 he wrote about vast elk (Cervus canadensis) herds on the Marin Headlands on December 27: "...we came to anchor near the mouth of the bay, under a high and beautifully sloping hill, upon which herds of hundreds and hundreds of red deer [note: "red deer" is the European term for "elk"], and the stag, with his high branching antlers, were bounding about..."

== Geology ==
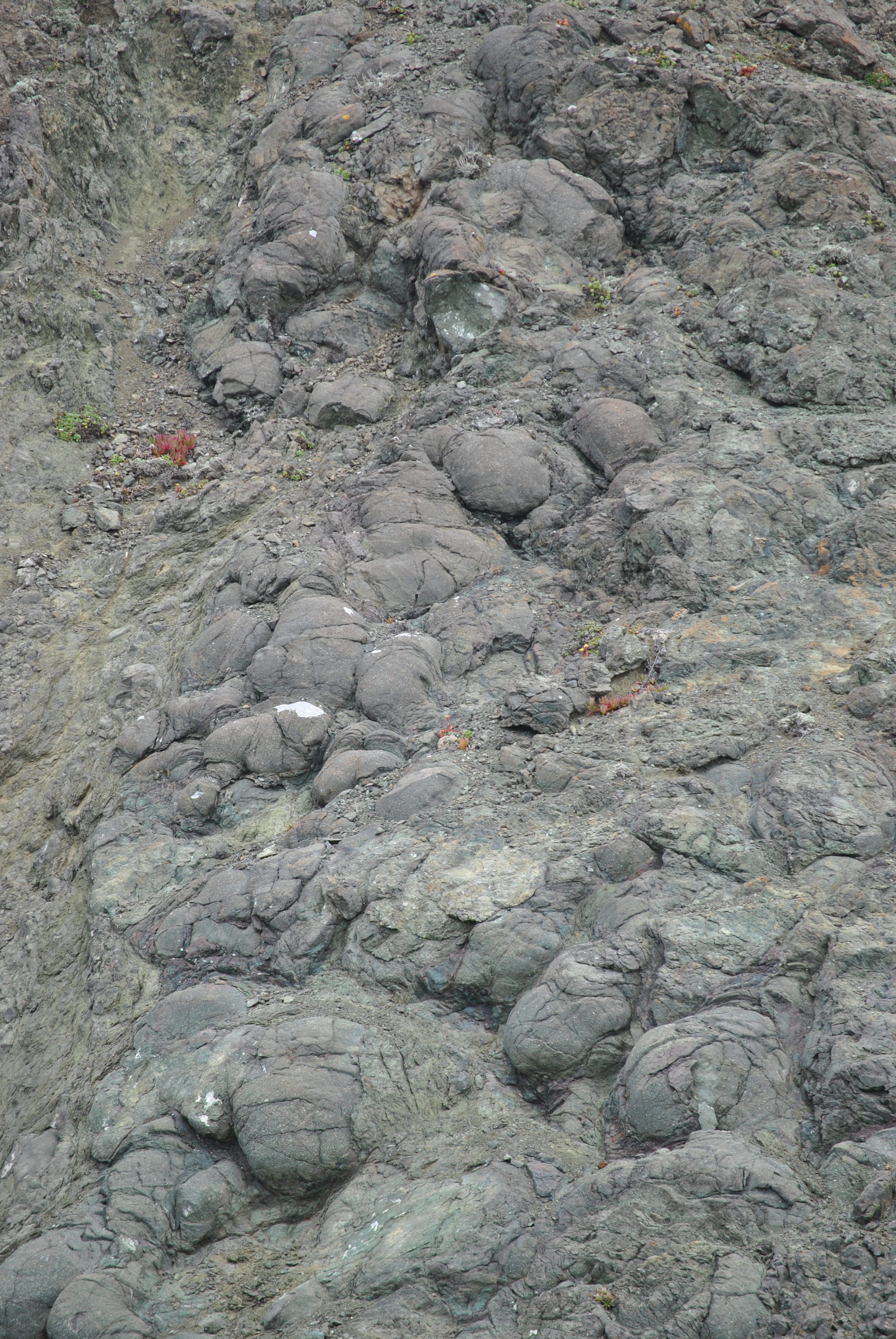
Well-preserved pillow lava in Marin Headlands

The Marin Headlands are underlain by geological formations created by the accretion of oceanic sediments from the Pacific Plate onto the North American Plate. The process of subduction of ocean floor, followed by tectonic underplating to the underside of the over-riding plate, was first described here by Clyde Wahrhaftig in 1984. The primary rock types of the Marin Headlands include graywacke sandstone, radiolarian chert, serpentinite, pillow basalts, and shale. These rocks began their migration over one hundred million years ago from as far south as present-day Los Angeles. The erosion of the hillsides and construction activities during the military era have exposed some dramatic examples of these rock types for easy viewing, and the folding caused by tectonic action is visually evident in many places throughout the Headlands.

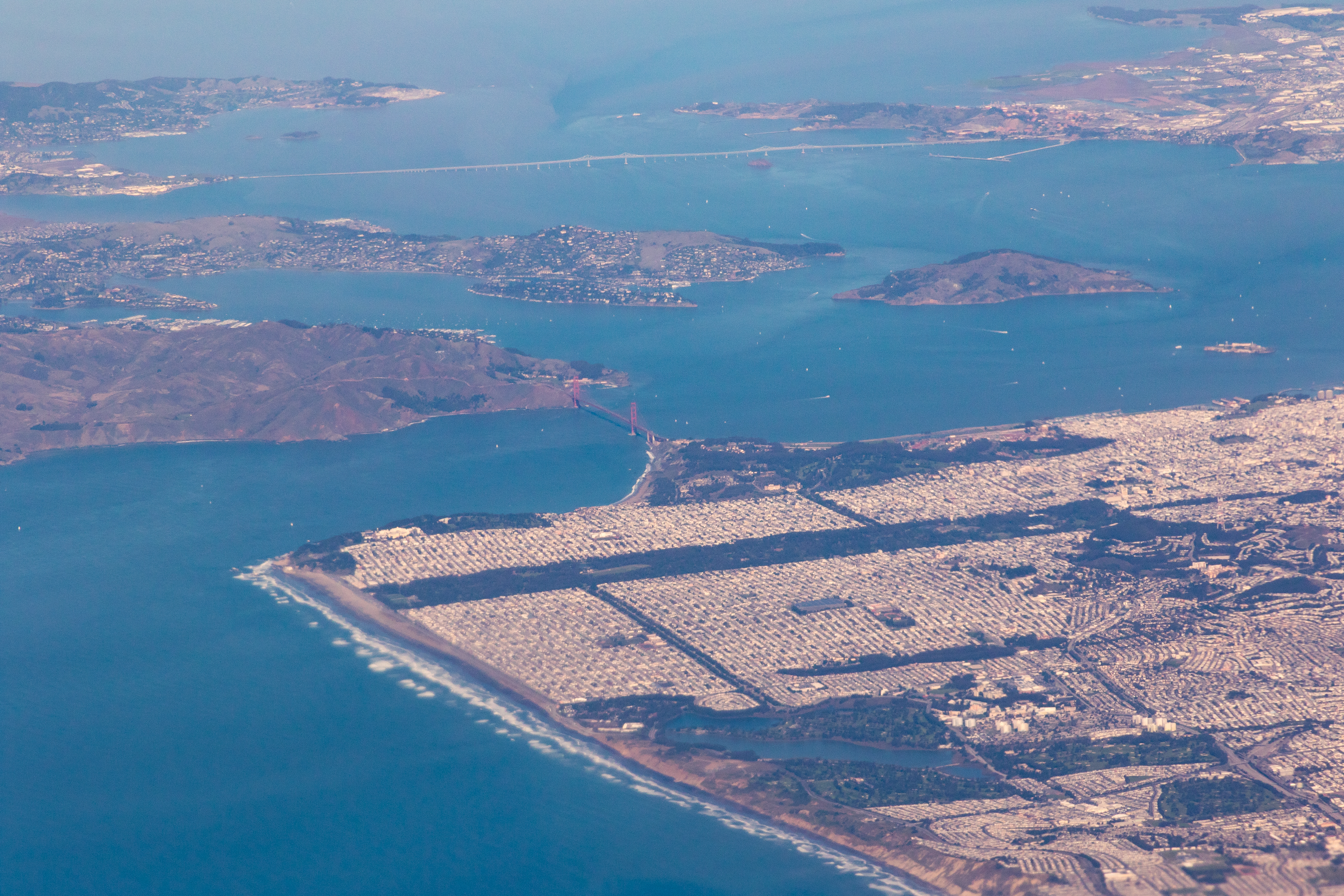
Aerial view of the Marin Headlands, Golden Gate Bridge, and San Francisco

The Marin Headlands are one of the featured field trips found in the Streetcar 2 Subduction online field trip guide series released in December 2019 by the American Geophysical Union.

== Cultural history ==
=== Native Americans ===
The Marin Headlands are home to the Coastal Miwok tribe. Before colonization, western expansion, and gentrification, the Miwok freely moved between the bay side of the peninsula and the ocean side, seasonally, for thousands of years. The growth of the San Francisco Bay Area has negatively impacted Miwok sacred sites, culture, and tribal visibility. Miwok continue to seek federal recognition.

=== Ranchos ===
In the 18th century, Spanish and Mexican ranchers occupied the Headlands, eventually giving way to Portuguese immigrant dairy farmers (often from the Azores) during the American period following the U.S. acquisition of California in the Mexican–American War.

=== Military sites ===
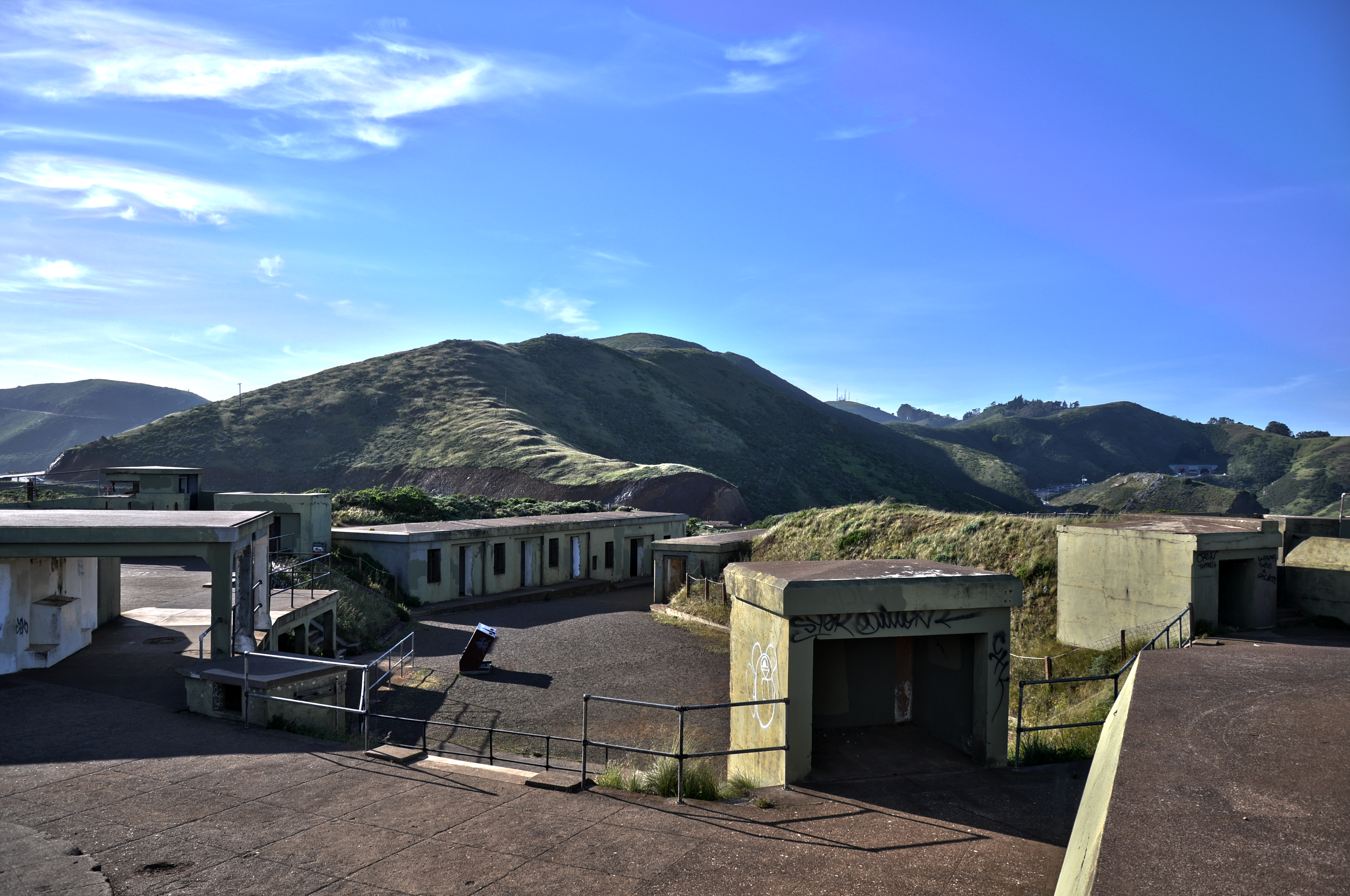
Battery Spencer, the closest defense site at the Marin Headlands to the Golden Gate Bridge

The Marin Headlands are the site of a number of historic military settlements and fortifications, including Fort Cronkhite, Fort Barry, a large number of bunkers and batteries, and the SF-88 Nike Missile silo. The Baker–Barry Tunnel connects the former military bases Fort Barry and Fort Baker in the Marin Headlands of Marin County, California. In the 1890s, the first military installations were built to prevent hostile ships from entering San Francisco Bay. The batteries at Kirby Cove, above Black Sands Beach, south of Rodeo Beach, and at Battery Mendell are examples of fortifications from the pre–World War I period. During World War II, Batteries Wallace, Townsley, and 129 on Hawk Hill were built into the hills to protect them from aerial bombardment and the high-caliber shells that would be fired by Axis battleships. The emplacements at the top of Hawk Hill were used for a radio station. During the Cold War, the gun batteries were decommissioned, but antiaircraft missile sites were built on the northern and southern sides of Rodeo Lagoon. Radar sites were placed atop Hawk Hill and Hill 88. At several locations, shelters were built into the hillsides to protect the military personnel from the use of nuclear, biological, or chemical weapons.

Observation posts known as base end stations can also be found in the Headlands. A well-preserved example can be seen near the northern end of Rodeo Beach, and others are located near the Point Bonita Lighthouse and on Wolf Ridge as it slopes down to the sea.

All military sites in the Headlands are now decommissioned and returned to civilian use. Some military facilities, such as SF-88, have been preserved as historical sites. Many historical buildings are now used by non-profit organizations, but maintained in their historical condition.

Other historic landmarks in the Headlands include Point Bonita Lighthouse.

=== Development ===
In the 1960s, the government sold over 2,000 acres (8 km^{2}) of land in the Marin Headlands to a private developer who planned to build a city named Marincello. The development was to house 30,000 people in 50 apartment towers, vast tracts of single-family homes, a shopping center, and a hotel along the Headlands' pristine shoreline and hills. In 1970, the developer lost a lawsuit claiming the land was illegally zoned. The thousands of acres that would have been developed were sold to the Golden Gate National Recreation Area, allowing the open space to stay intact as a park.

== Recreation ==
=== Views ===
The area has views of San Francisco and, as such, is a tourist destination. One of the most common photographs of San Francisco is the view of the city from the Headlands with the towers of the Golden Gate Bridge just reaching out of the fog. On clear days, the site offers views of the bay, including the Farallon Islands, Angel Island, Alcatraz, the San Francisco–Oakland Bay Bridge, the Golden Gate Bridge, Mount Tamalpais and the East Bay.

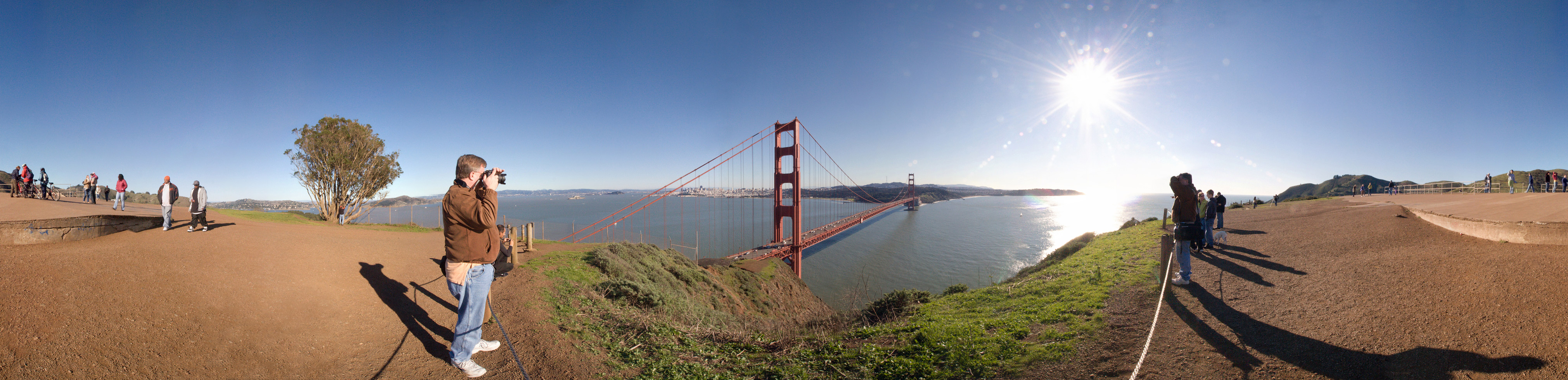
A 360° panorama of the San Francisco Golden Gate Bridge as viewed from the Marin Headlands
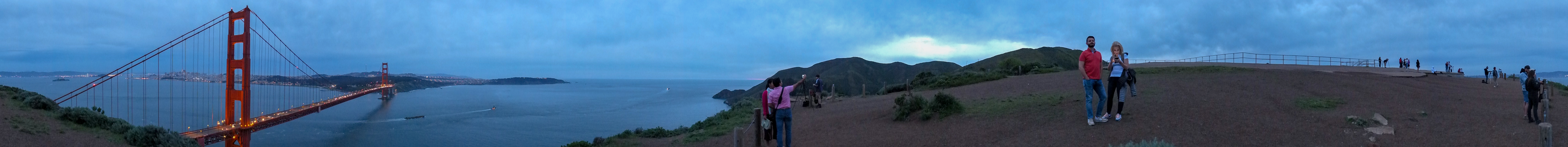
Panorama at nightfall

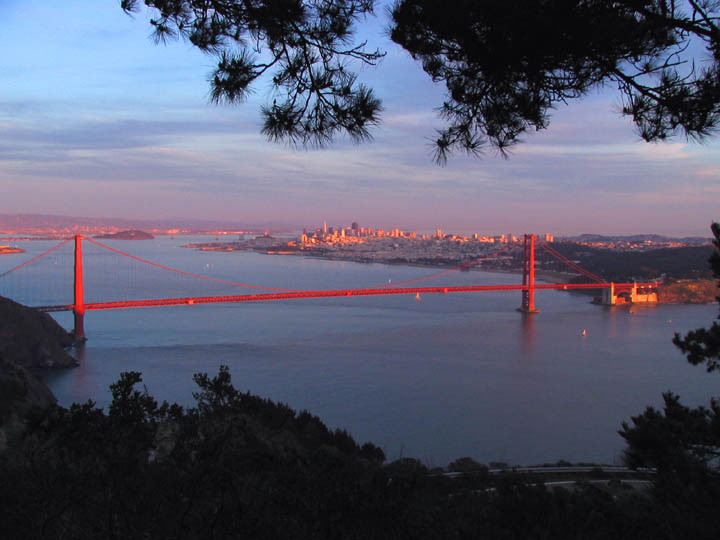
View of Golden Gate Bridge and San Francisco from Hawk Hill

Where Conzelman Road runs along the southern shore of the Headlands and becomes one-way, a pedestrian path leads upwards to Hawk Hill. A short distance further on the right, in a grove of Monterey pines, is a bench from which it is possible to view the Golden Gate, ship traffic passing beneath the bridge, and the city just beyond.

=== Beaches ===
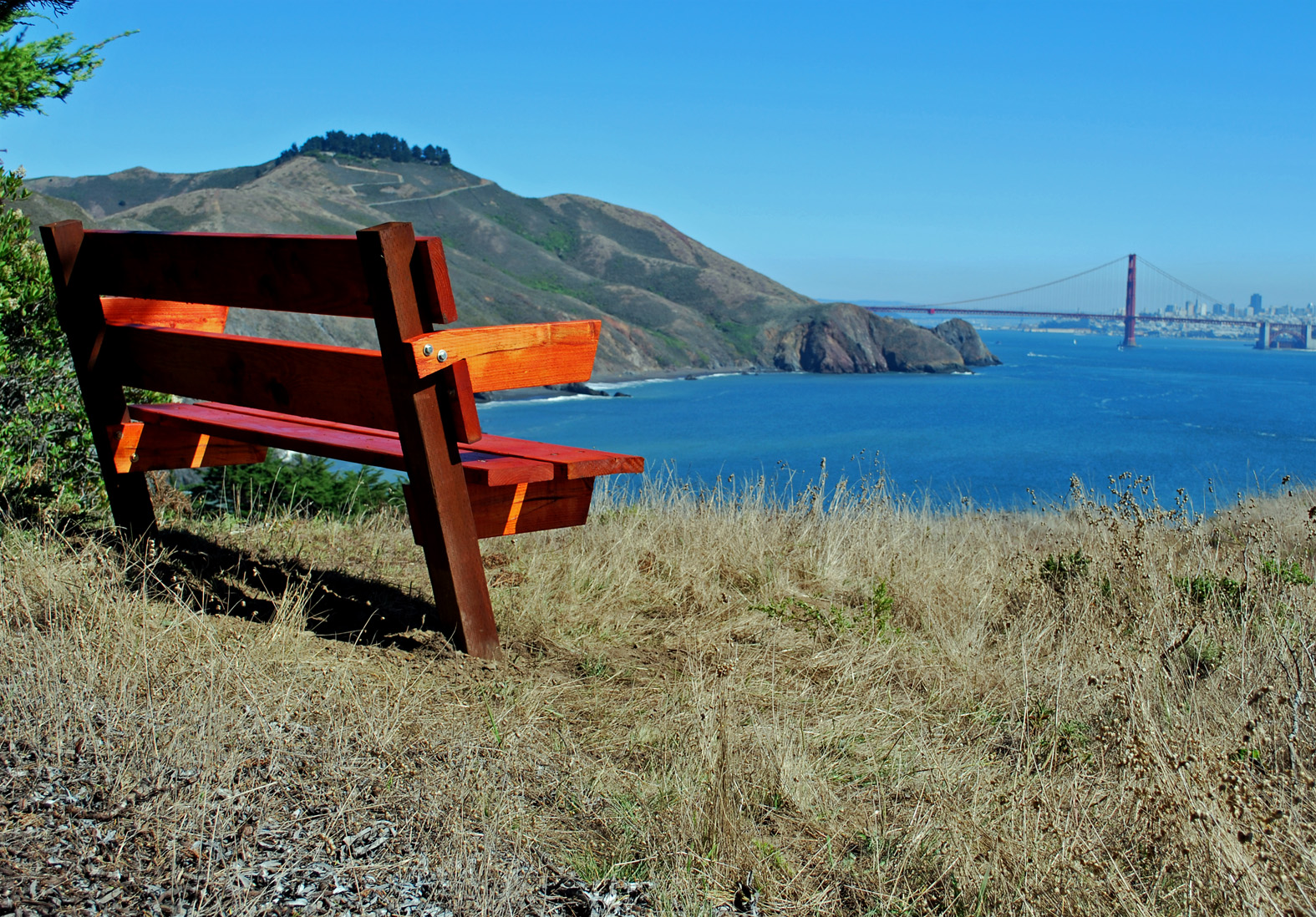
The entrance to the Golden Gate from Battery Wallace Mano Seca Bench

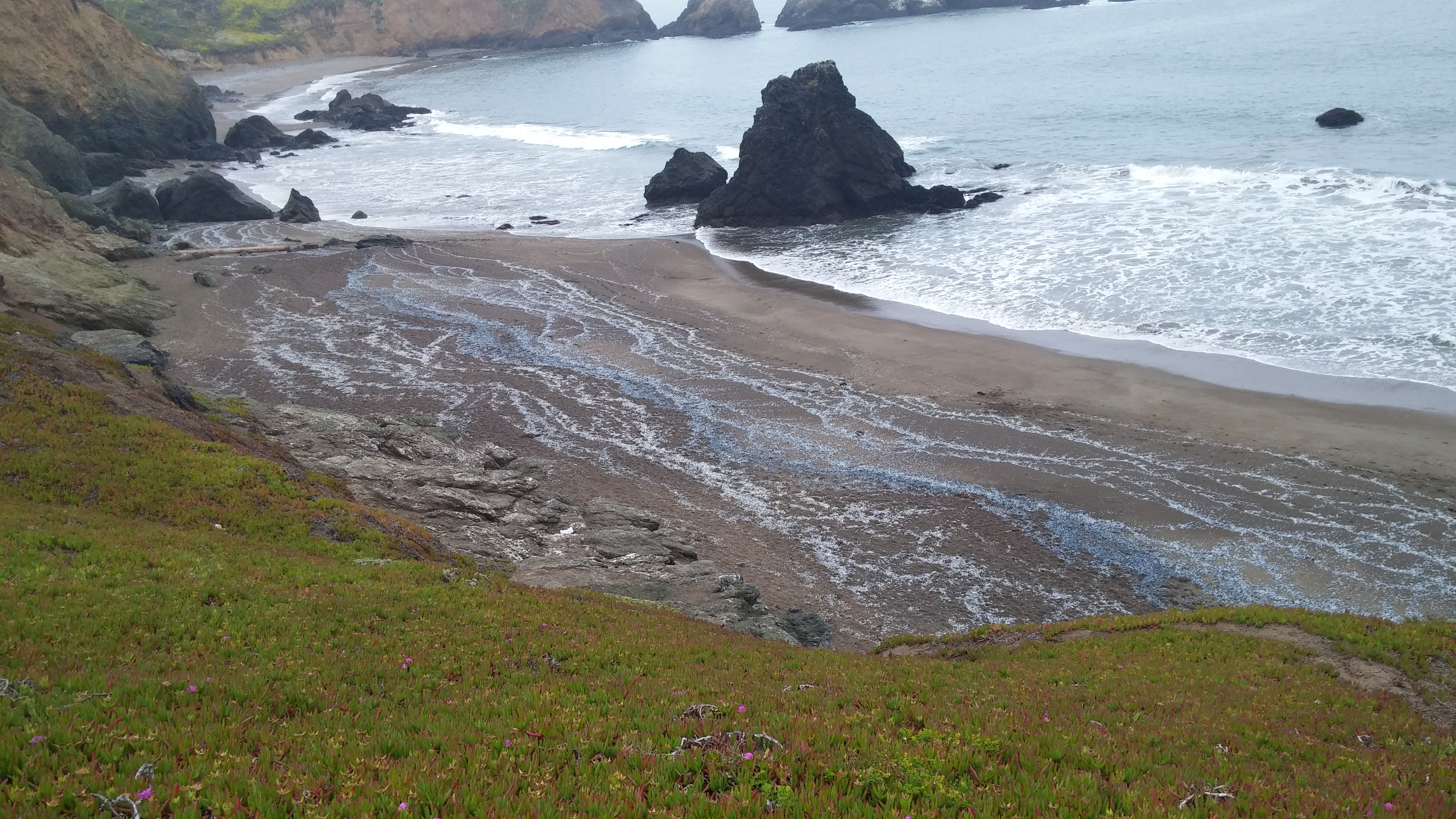
Overlooking Rodeo Beach in the Marin Headlands. Velella (by-the-wind sailors) are stranded, forming blue ribbons.

The Headlands offers a number of beaches including Rodeo Beach (a pebble-covered, dark sand beach), Kirby Cove, Pirates' Cove, Black Sands Beach, Tennessee Beach, Muir Beach. Rodeo and Muir Beaches are accessible by car, while the others require hikes of varying length and difficulty.

=== Hiking/biking ===
There are many hiking and biking trails in the Headlands, several of which pass through coastal sage scrub, chaparral, and riparian areas.

=== Birding ===
The raptor migration attracts birdwatchers to Hawk Hill, and waterfowl and seabirds can sometimes be seen on Rodeo Lagoon.

== Facilities and notable places ==
The National Park Service maintains a visitor center near the intersection of Field Road and Bunker Road about a mile from Rodeo Beach. The visitor center contains historical and natural history displays as well as a small bookstore/gift shop. Hiking maps and Park Service program information are available as well.

Facilities include Presidio Fire Department Fire Station No. 2, located at building 1045 Fort Cronkhite. This fire station is operated by the National Park Service and houses one fire engine with cliff rescue capabilities.

Public restrooms are available in the Headlands at the visitor center parking lot, the parking lot near Rodeo Beach, and portable toilet facilities are available at the trailhead leading to the Point Bonita Lighthouse, along Conzelman Road near Black Sands Beach, at Battery Alexander dug into the hillside between Rodeo Beach and the Lighthouse, and at Battery 129 on Hawk Hill.

Conference center facilities are located in former military buildings maintained by the Point Bonita YMCA, NatureBridge, and the Headlands Center for the Arts. The Cavallo Point conference center is in East Fort Baker on the eastern side of the peninsula.

Other areas within Marin Headlands include Kirby Cove, Rodeo Lagoon, and Tennessee Cove.

Various nonprofit organizations have facilities in Marin Headlands. These include the Marine Mammal Center, the Foundation for Deep Ecology, and the NatureBridge campus (formerly known as the Headlands Institute), all in Fort Cronkhite; the Headlands Center for the Arts and the Marin Headlands Hostel at Fort Barry; and the Marin Headlands and Tennessee Valley Native Plant Nurseries.

== See also ==
- Mission blue butterfly habitat conservation
