= Kirby Cove Camp =

Campground in California, United States

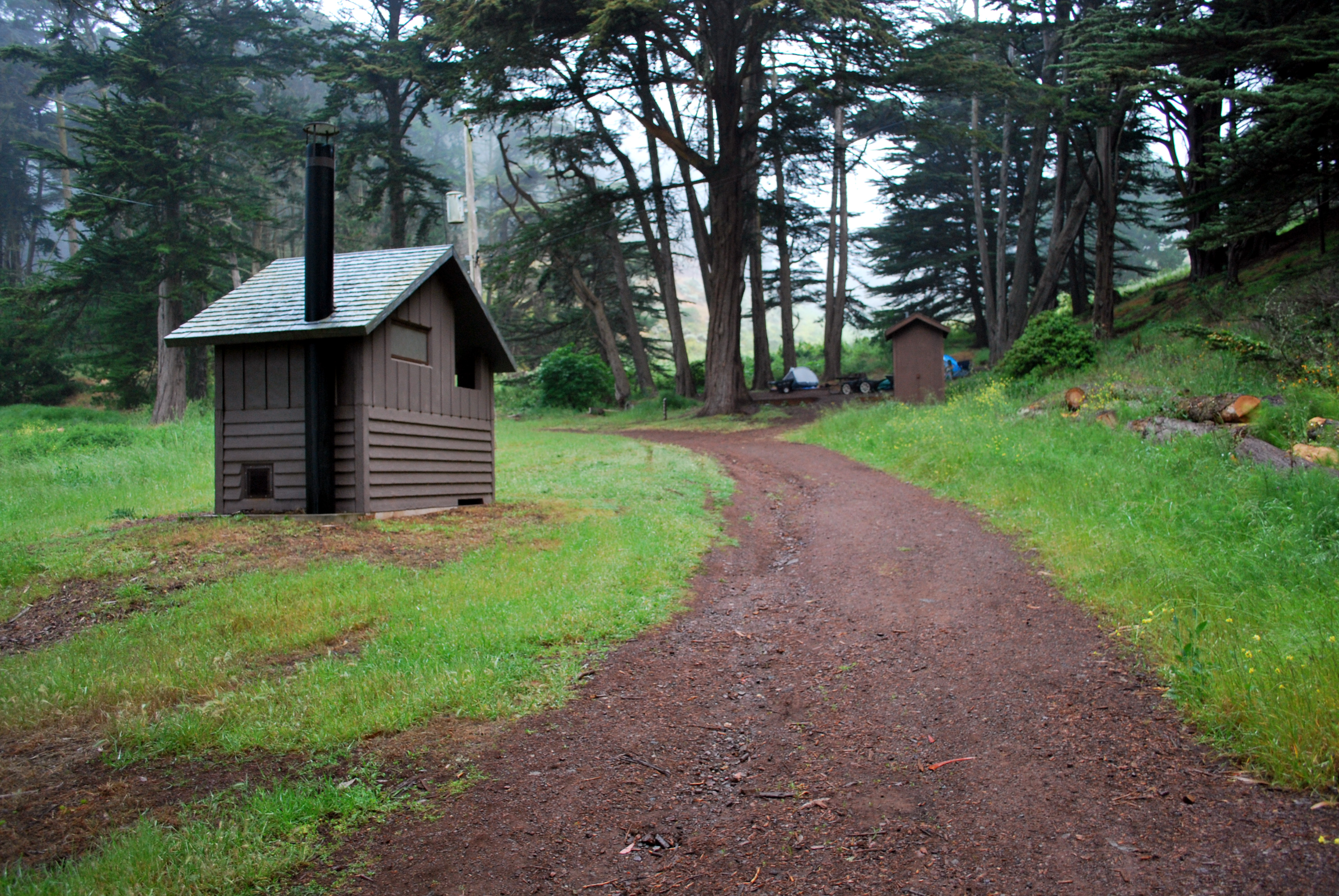
- A view of campsite #4 with outhouse
- Interactive map of Kirby Cove Camp
- Location: Golden Gate National Recreation Area, Marin Headlands
- Coordinates: 37.827039°N 122.490638°W
- Elevation: Sea Level
- Type: Drive in
- Campus size: 400-acre (1.6 km^{2})
- Campsites: 4 overnight sites and 1 day use site
- Facilities: Picnic Table, Waterless toilet
- Water: None
- Fee: $30 per night camping, $45 day use picnic area
- Fires: Fire Ring, BBQ Grill
- Season: March to November
- Operated by: GGNRA
- Website: recreation.gov

Kirby Cove Camp is a campground and scenic area managed by the Golden Gate National Recreation Area (GGNRA) in the Marin Headlands, California. It is located at sea level below Conzelman Road, which leads from the north end of the Golden Gate Bridge up and along the Marin Headlands overlooking the Golden Gate strait that leads into San Francisco Bay. A road behind a locked gate leads to Kirby Cove from just beyond Battery Spencer, the first set of bunkers encountered from Highway 101 at the north end of the Golden Gate Bridge.

== Description ==
Kirby Cove Camp is located on the north shore of the Golden Gate, in a sheltered cove. It features a small beach with rocky bluffs on either side. A coastal defense site, Battery Kirby, separates the campground from the beach. Much of the cove is forested by non-native eucalyptus, pine, and Monterey cypress. The forest and steep slopes around the cove provide some shelter from the often harsh winds of the Golden Gate. The cove is noted for its isolated feel adjacent to the large, urban setting of San Francisco.

=== Camping and hiking ===
Kirby Cove is a tent-only, walk-in campground. No RVs, van, or car camping is allowed. Campsite 1 is located on a bluff above the eastern end of Kirby Cove Beach. Campsites 2, 3, and 4 are located away from the water, nestled within groves of trees. To view the Golden Gate, its towering bridge, the City of San Francisco and Land's End, one can walk to the bluff above the beach in front of the batteries and sit at a picnic table.

Campsites require reservations made online and are extremely competitive. Campers with reservations gain gate access to park near the campsites. Accessing the area for day-use without a reservation requires hiking past a locked gate and descending a mile-long road. Reservations must be made for Kirby Cove Camp for either overnight camping. Limits are placed on the duration of stay and the amount of yearly use to open this opportunity for as many as possible.

=== Battery Kirby history ===
Kirby Cove – Golden Gate National Recreation Area Gravelly Beach Battery Battery Kirby
- Golden Gate, California
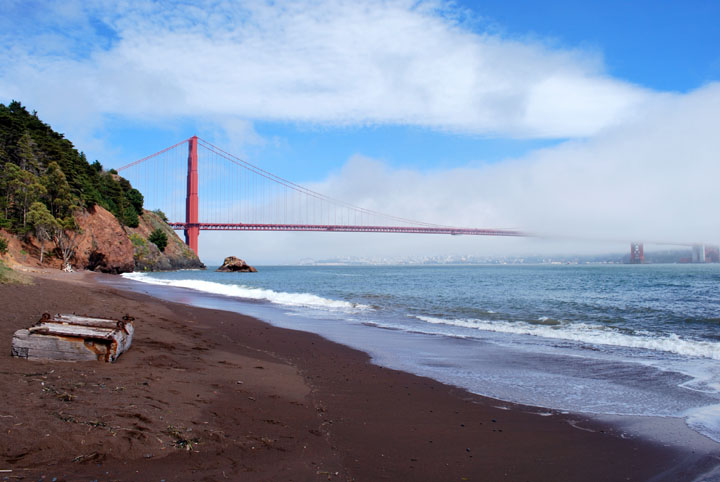

Location
- Coordinates: 37.827039°N 122.490638°W

Site history
- Built: 1898
- In use: 1934
- Fate: Abandoned

Construction began in 1898 to place a maritime artillery battery in the valley just above a small beach close to the entrance to San Francisco Bay. As the plan was approved and construction began, the defensive battery was named "Gravelly Beach Battery", using the common name of the truly gravelly beach at the site. The battery was subsequently renamed Battery Kirby in honor of 1st Lieutenant Edmund Kirby, 1st U.S. Artillery. Lt. Kirby headed a Civil War volunteer battalion and was promoted to brigadier general on the day that he died in combat at the Battle of Chancellorsville on May 28, 1863. The name then was extended to first the valley in which the battery was built, subsequently to the present National Park Service campground administrated by the GGNRA.

Battery Kirby saw service from 1898 to March 30, 1934, when it was placed in an abandoned status as obsolete.

Historical Information:

- Kirby Battery was equipped with two 12-inch shell B.L.R. (breech-loading rifle) Rifles Model 1895 nos. 12 and 16
- The artillery pieces were manufactured at the Watervliet Arsenal in Watervliet, New York – near Albany
- Upon de-commissioning of the battery, the guns were sent to Ft. Mills, Corregidor, Subic Bay, Manila, Philippines in 1933(#12)and 1941(#16)

Originally, very few trees grew in the windswept and steep valley at Kirby Cove. Today's present forest was planted over the years as Battery Kirby was developed and occupied. It is dominated by cypress, eucalyptus and pine trees.

== Image gallery ==
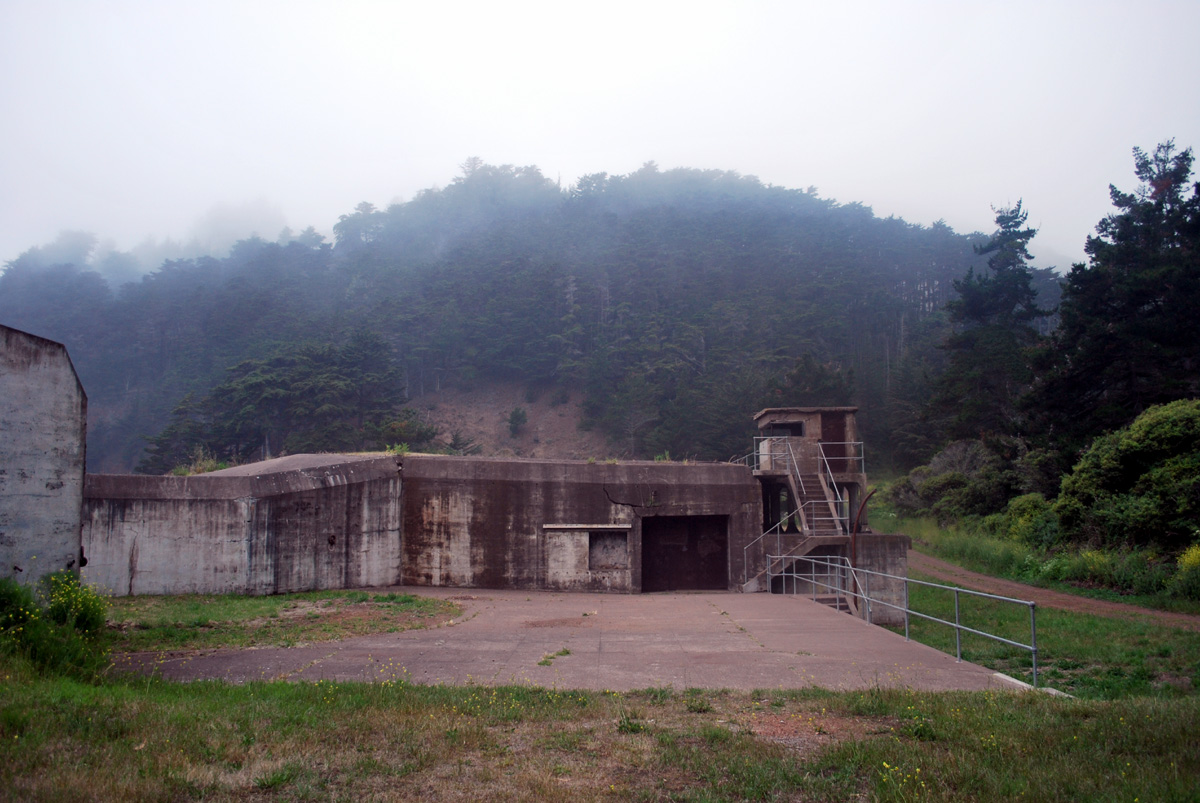
Battery Kirby

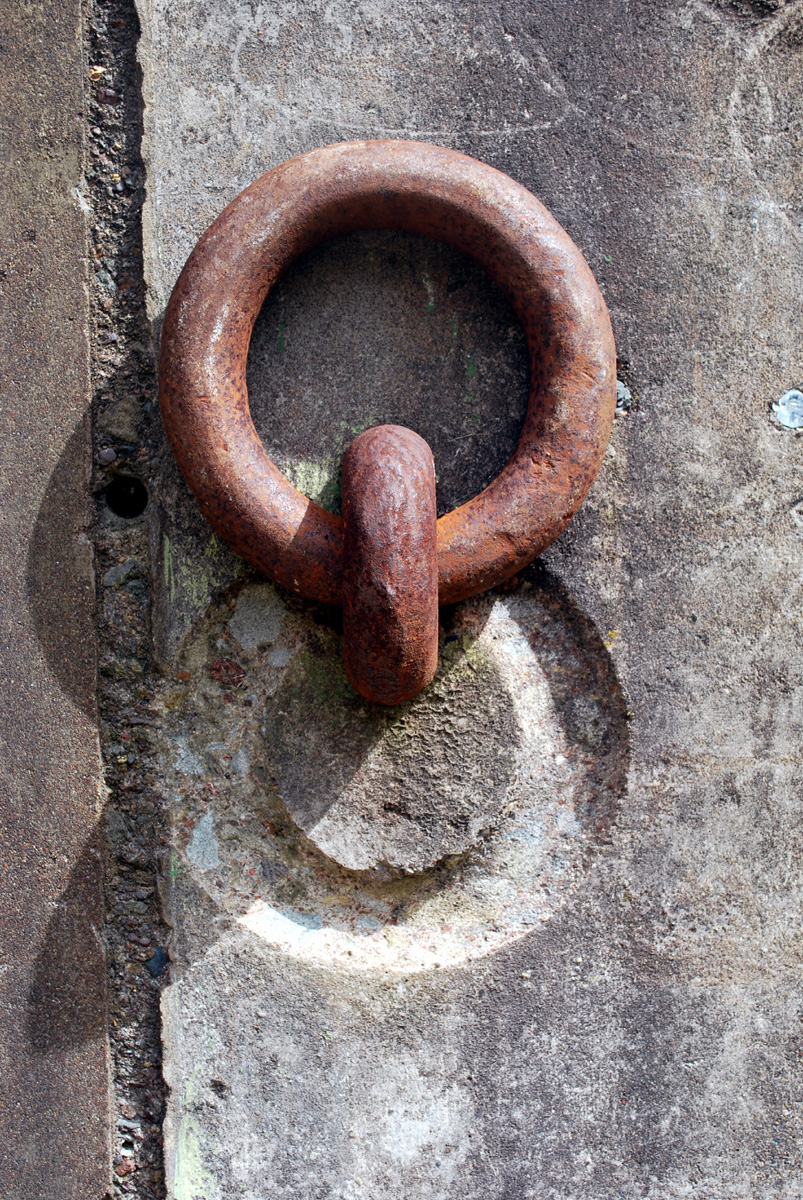
Steel Tie-down Ring for Artillery

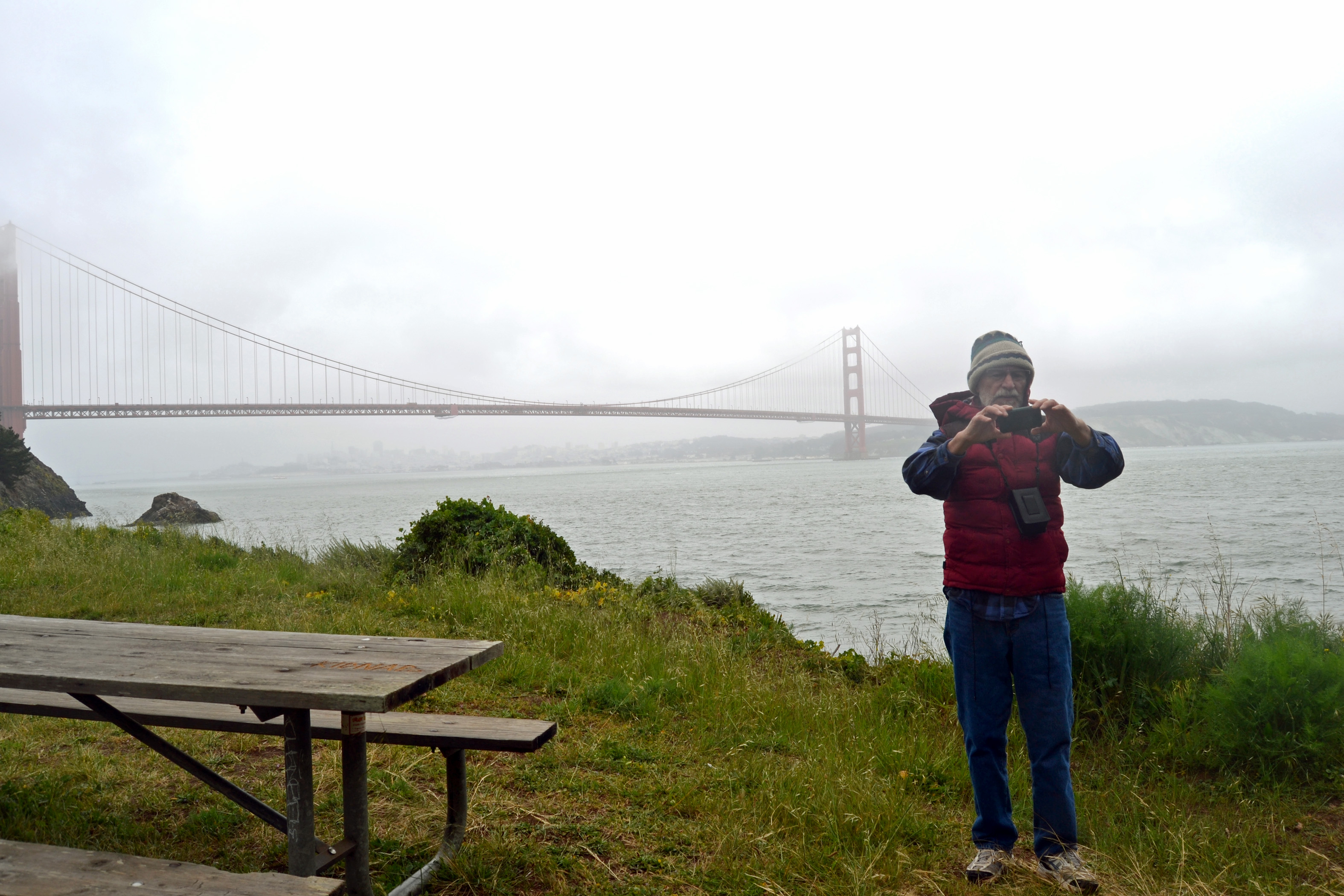
Photographer Shivers

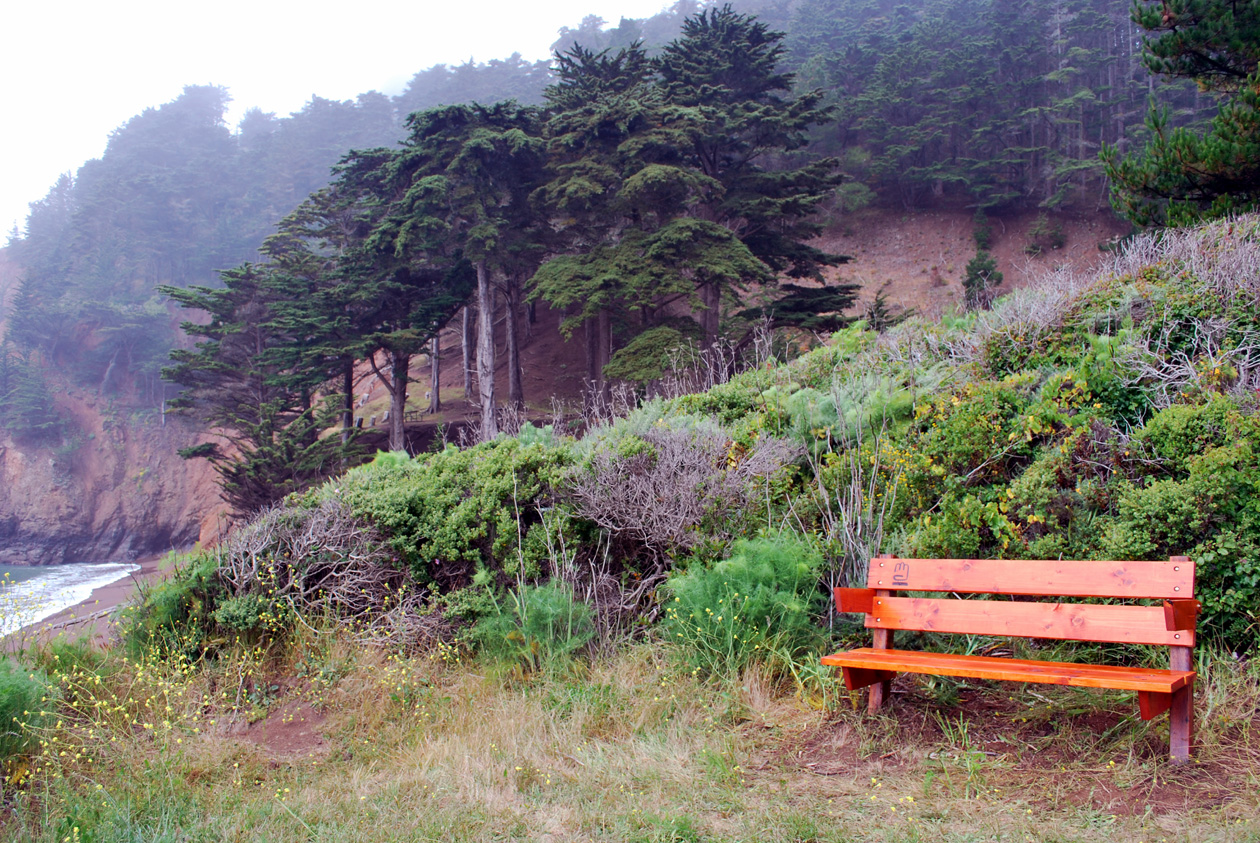
Another Mano Seca Bench, placed June 2010

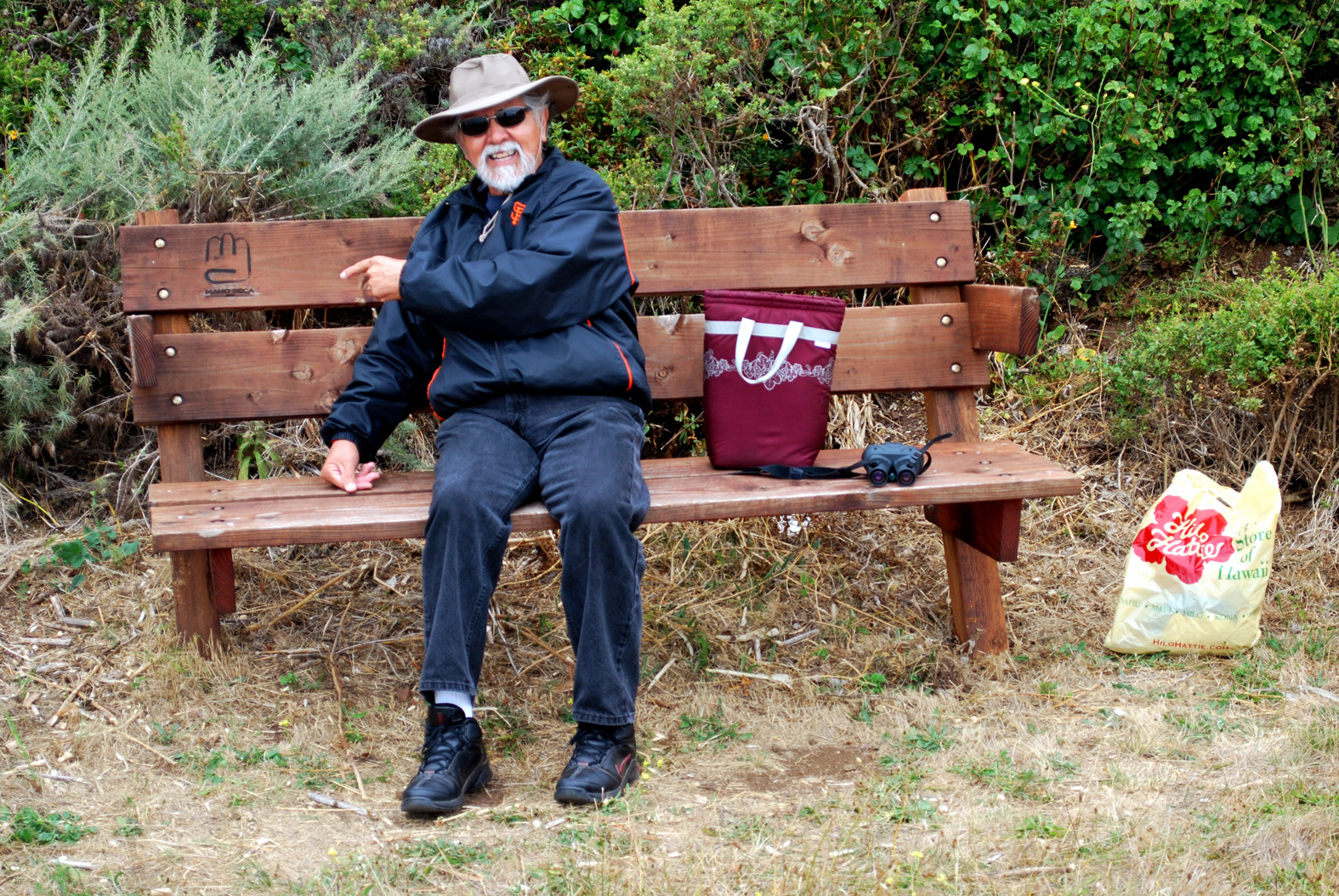
Mano Seca Bench after a year of exposure

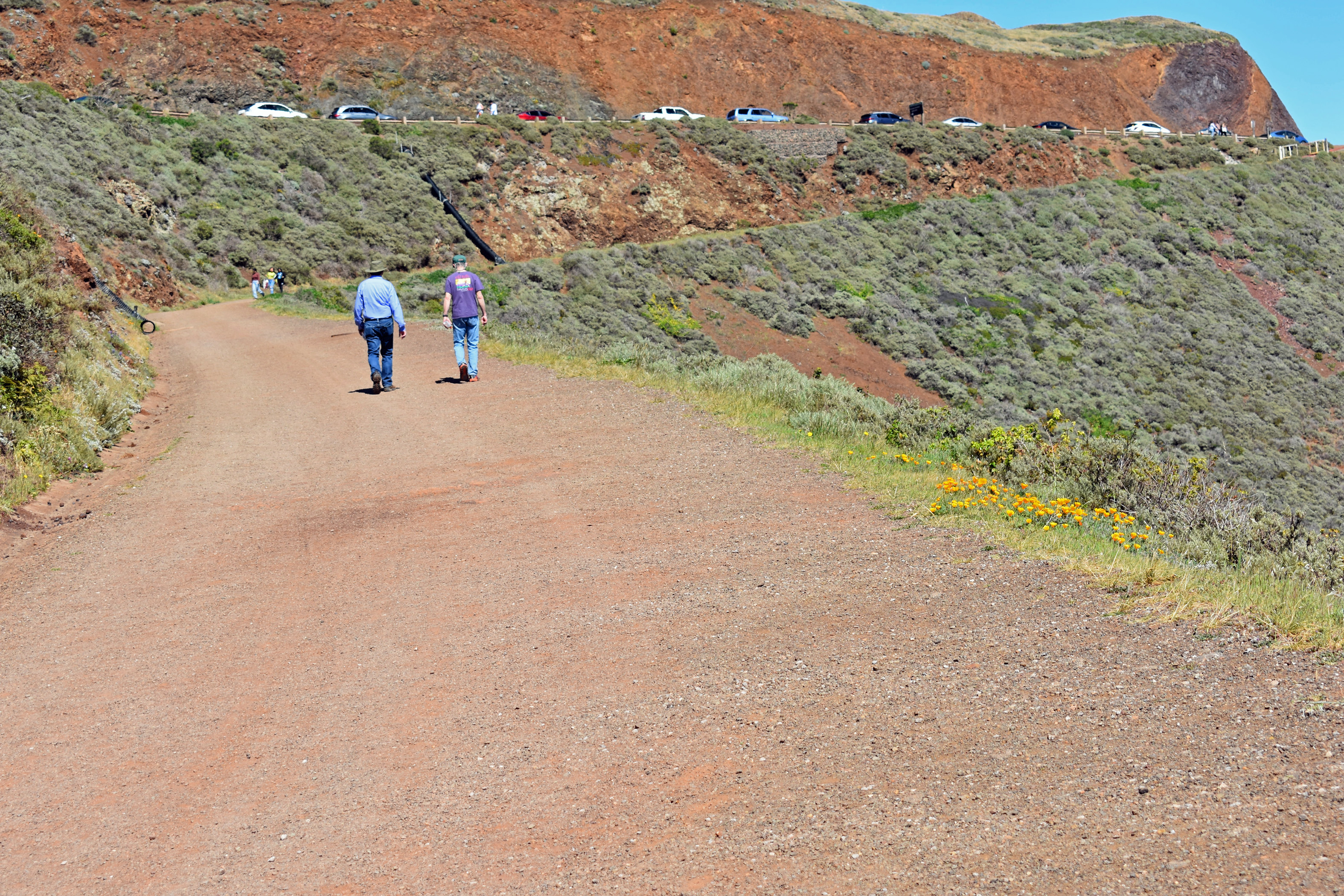
This shows the road down to Kirby Cove from Conzelman Road, close to the top.

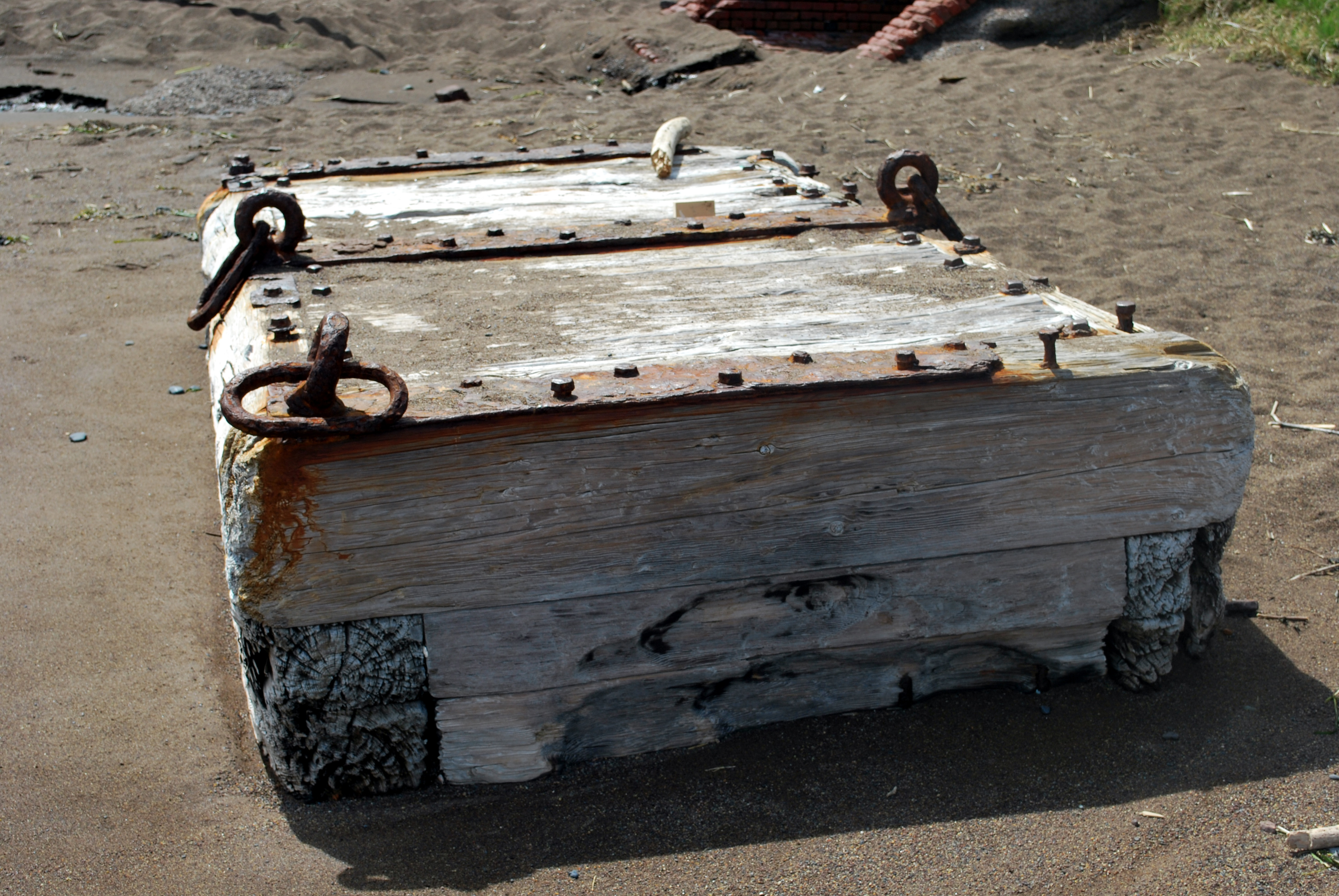
Pacific Flotsam resting at Kirby Cove Beach

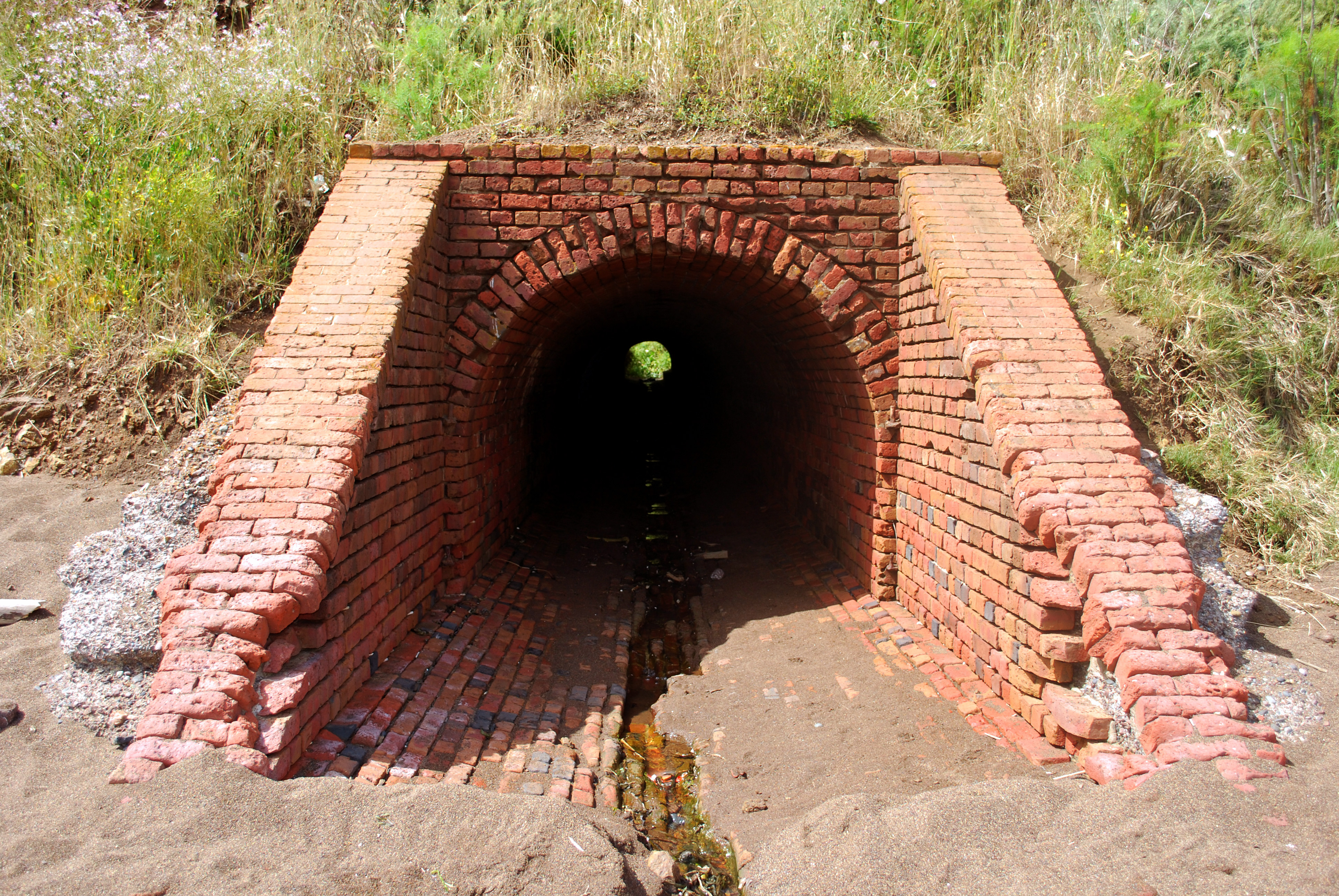
Tunnel draining Kirby Cove canyon creek through Battery Kirby

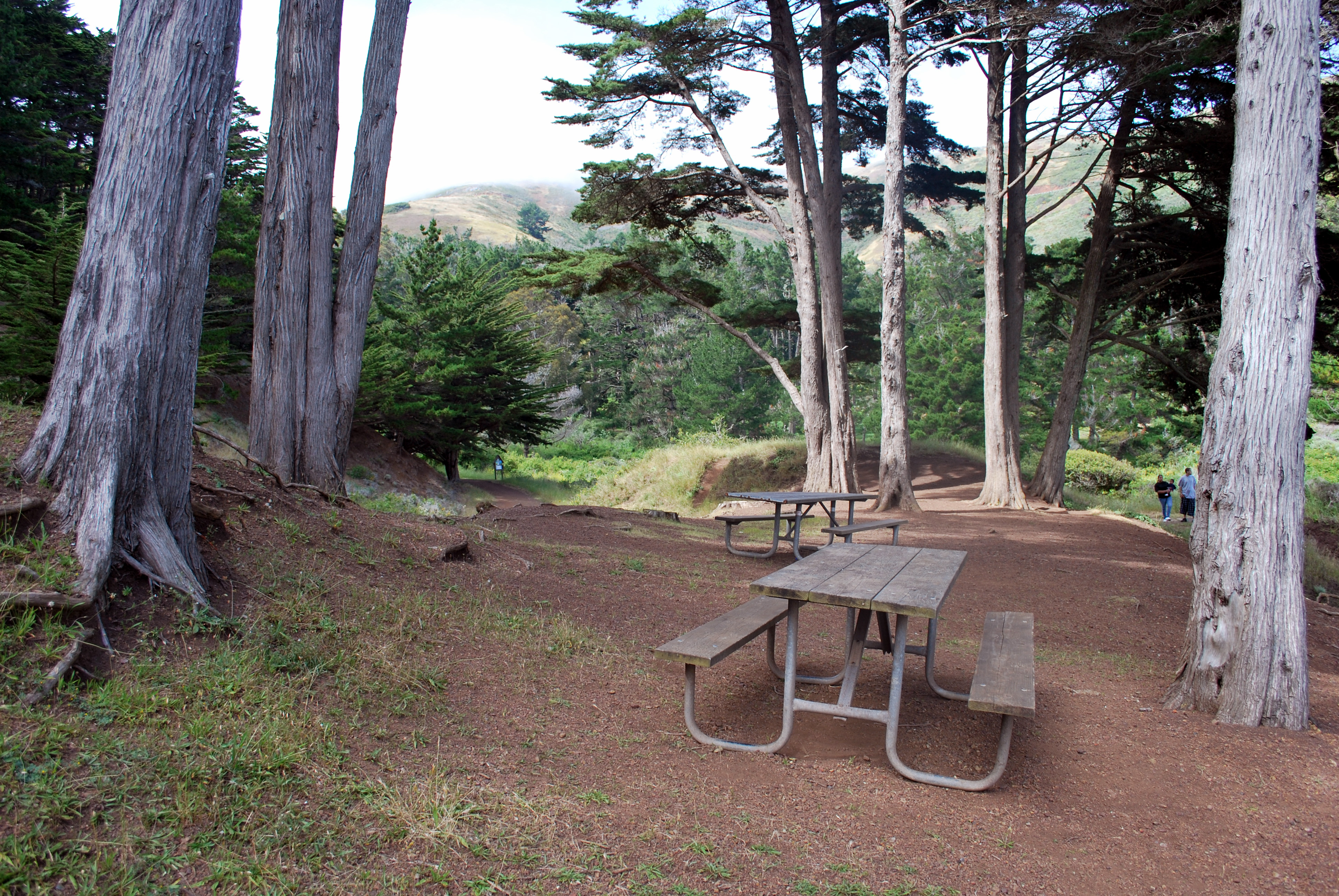
Picnic tables on bluff above Kirby Cove Beach

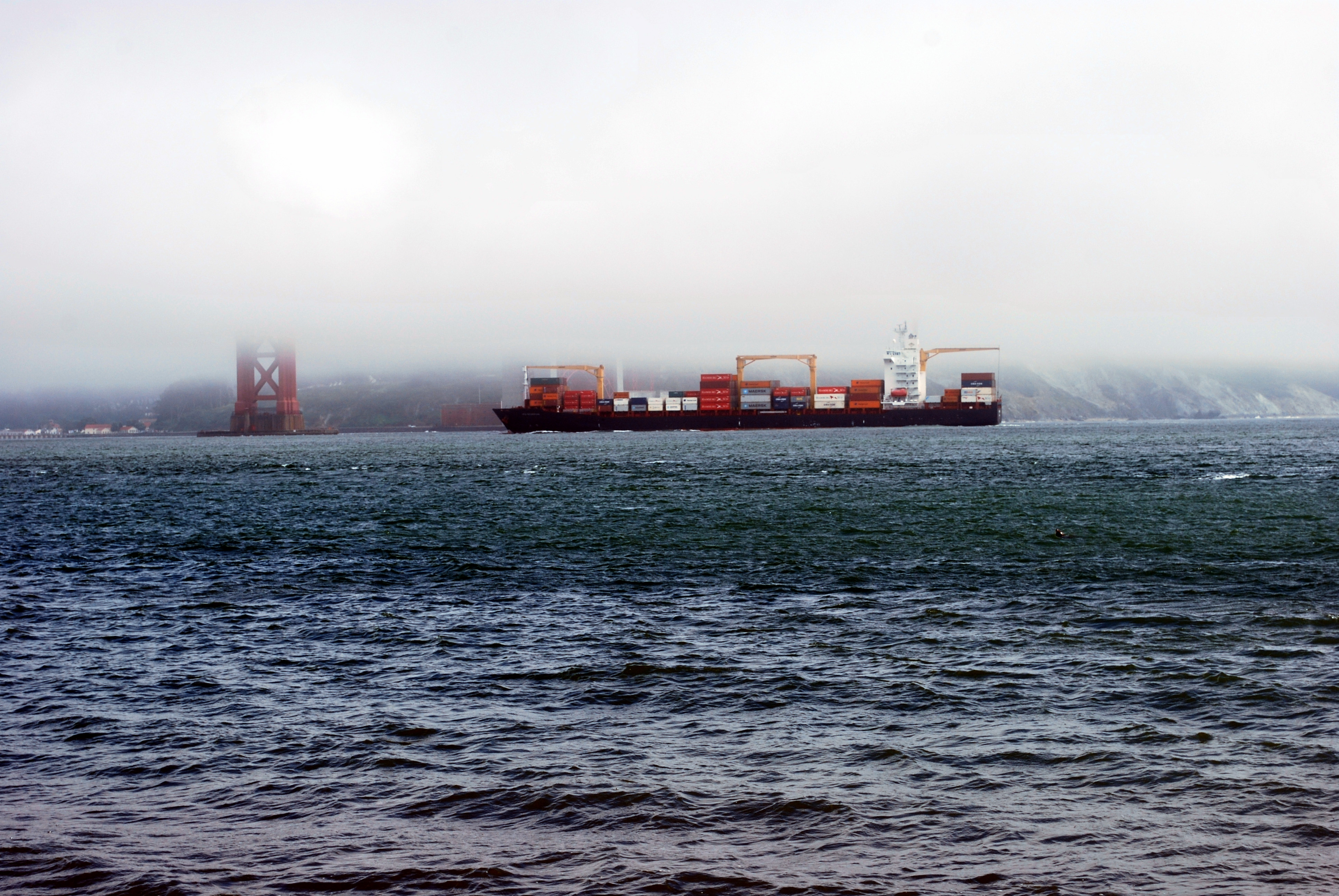

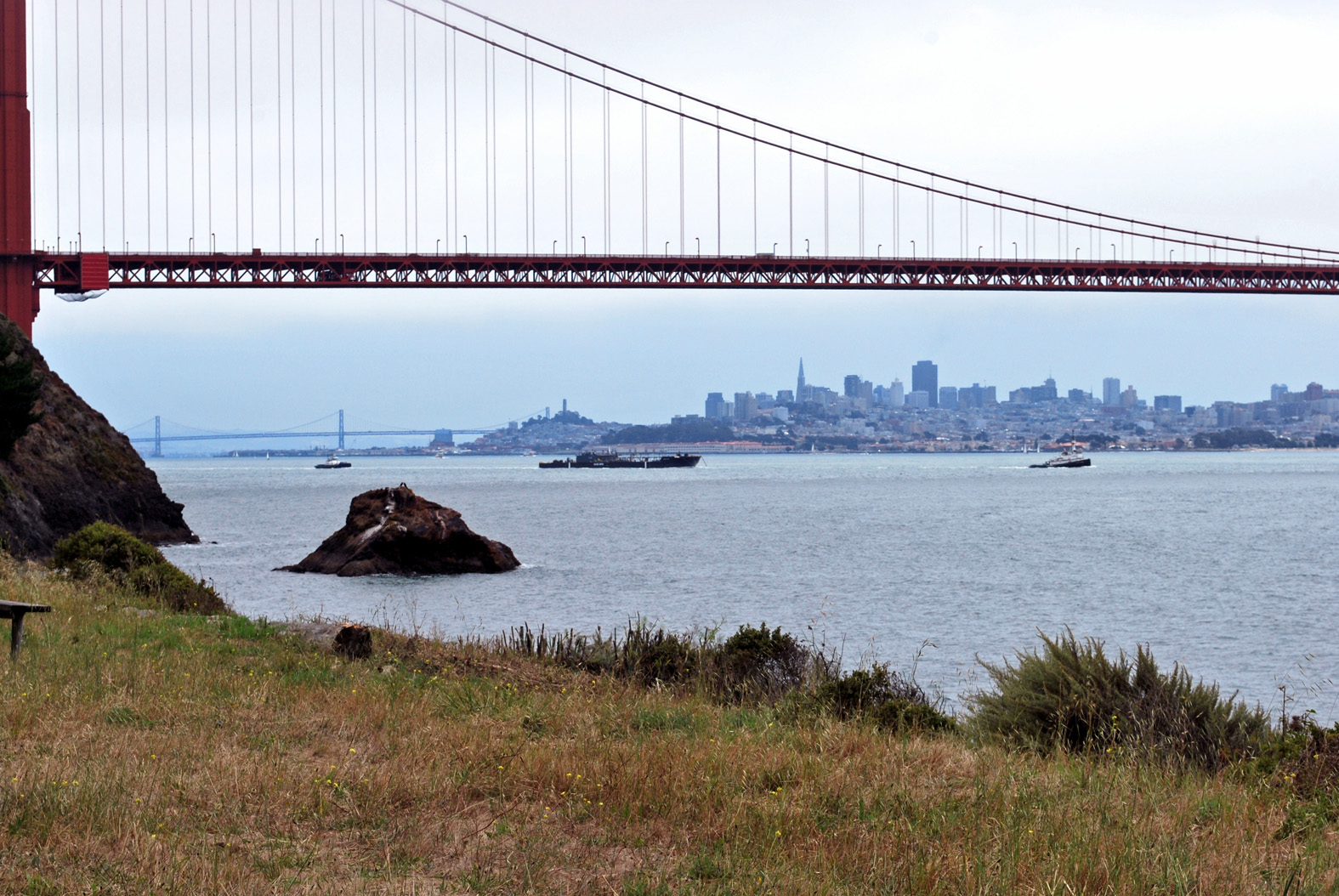
San Francisco with high marine layer overcast

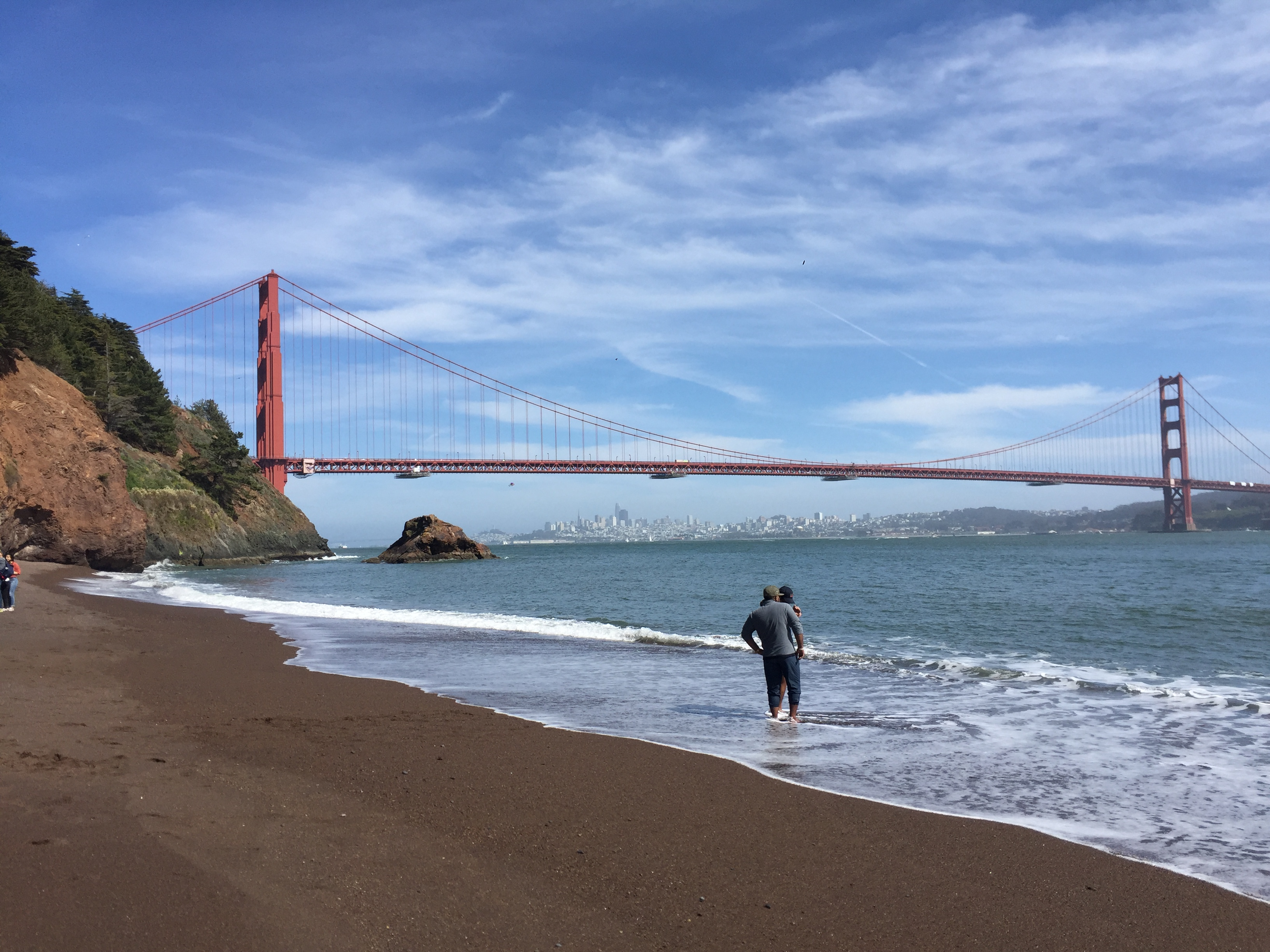
View of San Francisco on a clear day
