= Hungry grass =

Patch of cursed grass in Irish mythology

In Irish mythology, hungry grass (Irish: féar gortach; also known as fairy grass) is a patch of cursed grass. Anyone walking on it was doomed to perpetual and insatiable hunger.

== History ==
Steenie Harvey suggests that the hungry grass is cursed by the proximity of an unshriven corpse known as the fear gorta, who in some retelling asks for alms and rewards those who offer them. William Carleton's stories suggest that faeries plant the hungry grass, or that a meal had been eaten in the area with no portion left to share with the "otherworld". According to Harvey, this myth may relate to beliefs formed in the Great Famine of the 1840s. In Margaret McDougall's letters, the phrase "hungry grass" is - by analogy to the myth - used to describe hunger pangs.

Carrying a crust in a pocket was believed to protect or ward off the effects of the grass as eating something immediately would avoid death from the sudden hunger.

Hungry grass or Féar gortach is also the native name for quaking-grass, believed to be a reference to its poor nutritional value.

A 1969 novel by Richard Power, is entitled The Hungry Grass.

== See also ==
- Hungry ghost
