= Marincello =

Development project in Marin County, California

Coordinates: 37°51′02″N 122°31′08″W

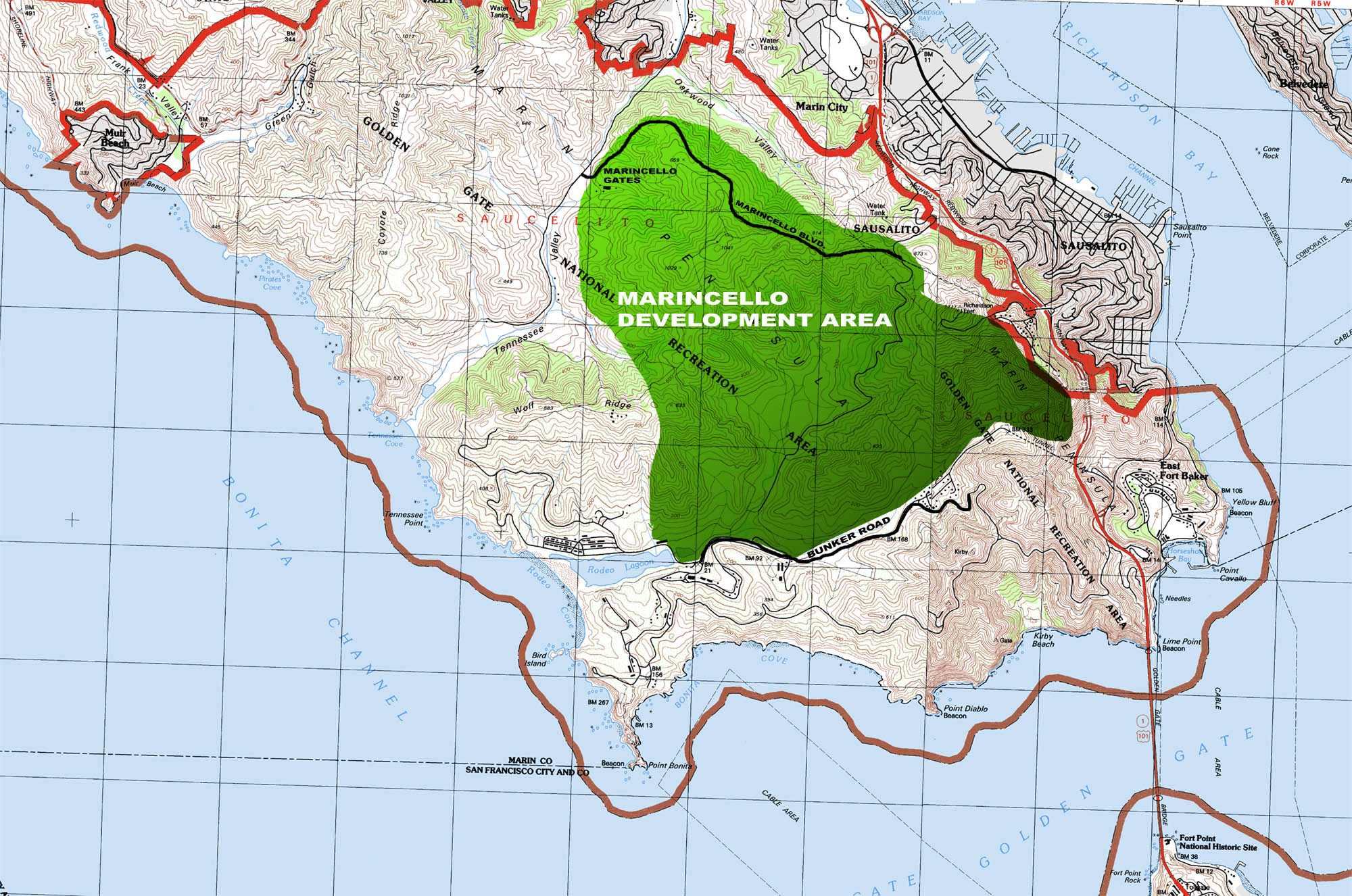
Where Marincello was to have been built

Marincello was an unbuilt development project in Marin County, California that would have put a planned community atop the Marin Headlands, overlooking the Golden Gate. Its upheaval set the precedent for Marin County's rigid anti-development stance and push for open space.

== History ==
=== Pre-Marincello years ===
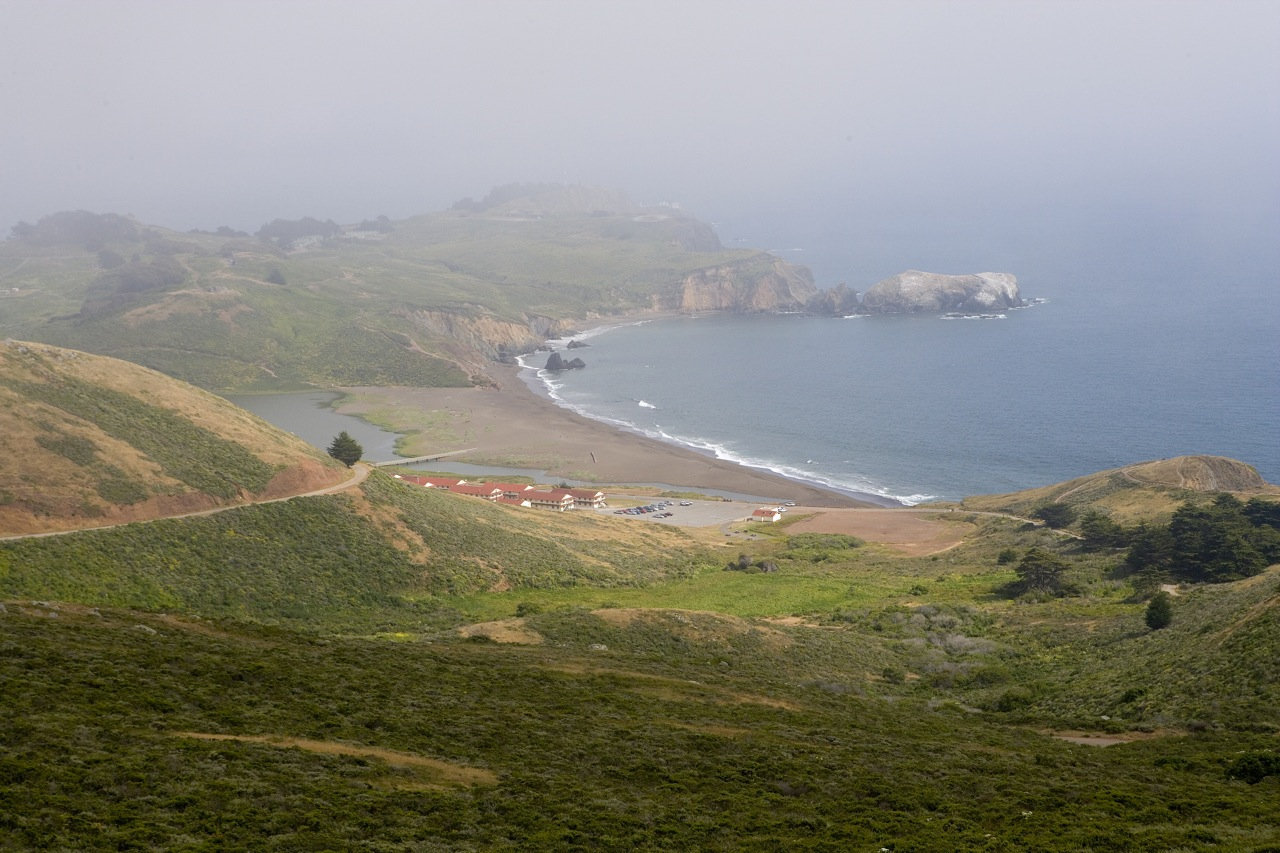
Looking south from the Marin Headlands

The land making up the Marin Headlands was purchased by the US military in 1851, shortly after California became a state, for the installation of coastal defense guns. Other than building Forts Barry, Baker, and Cronkhite, and planting trees and vegetation to camouflage the forts from attack, the Marin Headlands was left in its native form. Its unique topography helped serve its purpose for the Army.

By the 1950s, the military installations were becoming obsolete and the government started to look into future plans for the land. Environmentalists urged the military to give the land to the Department of Parks and Recreation to preserve its native and open quality. They also lobbied to make the forts a historic area and part of a Marin Headlands State Park.

=== Sale of the land ===
By the 1960s, the rise of the suburb was in full effect in the United States, and it looked like the pristine land atop the Marin Headlands (only minutes away from San Francisco) would prove no different. A developer from Bridgeport, Connecticut named Thomas Frouge (March 16, 1914 - January 1969) came across the area and immediately had grand visions for the land, writing “It is probably the most beautiful location in the United States for a new community." With help from Gulf Oil, he purchased the 2,138 acres (9 km^{2}) of land and made immediate plans for his new planned community to be called "Marincello."

Marincello was originally conceived to house 20,000–30,000 people in 50 apartment towers, as well as hundreds of homes and townhouses. There would also be a mall and a grand hotel at the highest point of the headlands.

A 3D model and proposed drawings were quickly created to start a sales pitch for the houses and apartments in this new city. These demonstrated how this native land was to be built upon in an unprecedented scale for Marin County. However, Frouge promised that Marincello would be a carefully planned city and would not fall siege to the mistakes of other bloated suburbs around the country. He also noted how the houses and apartments would be built with an "open-space" architecture in mind and would effortlessly blend into the unique landscape.

Many preservationists and Marin County leaders did not see it this way. Already worried about the diminishing quality of life and the growing amount of development in the county, Marincello was looked at as the last straw that would lead to endless amounts of development around the area.

A small group of activists called the Golden Gate Headlands Committee challenged the pending approval of the project. They submitted a 6,000-name petition to the Board of Supervisors. It was met with a blind eye. A second submission of a petition was invalidated, as the county threw out 300 of the signatures and moved on.

Many local newspapers published articles supporting the grand city, including one from the San Francisco Examiner reporting the plan "could not be sooner nor could the site be better chosen".

They believed that Frouge's development would draw attention away from other open spaces in Marin that other developers were eyeing to build upon, including the untouched Marin seashore area. In a 1965 article, the Pacific Sun wrote that Thomas Frouge's city "will be a showcase, which will point the way to preservation of the clear and open areas essential and unique in Marin.”

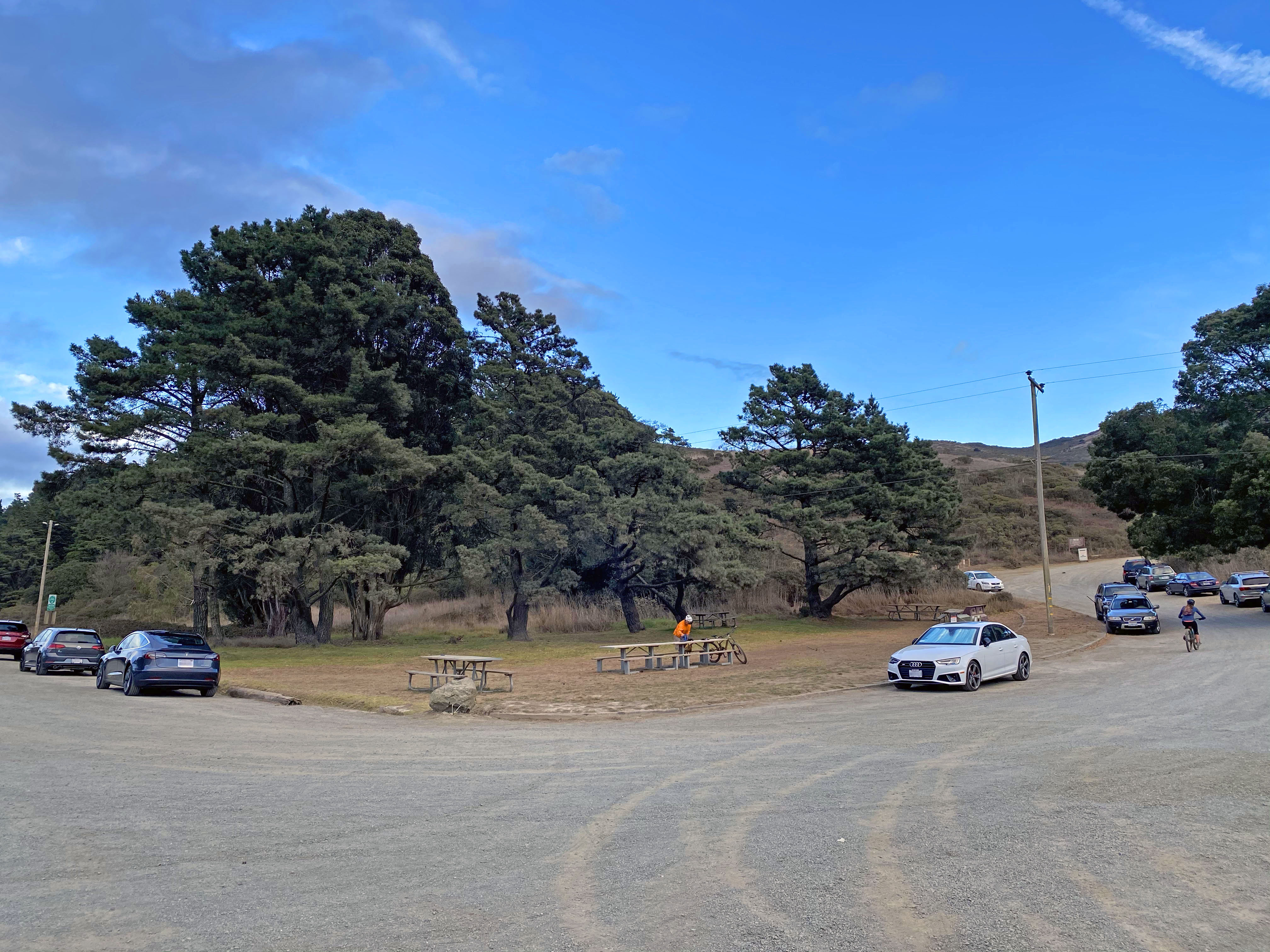
Present day location of Marincello gates in comparison to how it looked in the late-1960s

=== The green light ===
In November 1965 the County of Marin officially approved Frouge's plan and Marincello got the green light for development. Large gates were immediately built at the base of Tennessee Valley that boldly marked the entrance for the to-be-built city. Bulldozers carved a large, five-lane boulevard up the mountain that was to be one of Marincello's main streets in and out of the community.

=== Legal debate ===
Even before Marin Supervisors approved the Marincello plan in November 1965, legal red tape started to slowly encompass the project. In June 1965, Frouge was sued for misappropriation and false representation of a proposed street entrance to Marincello that trespassed upon private property of existing homeowners. This entrance was off Wolfback Ridge Road (from the Spencer Avenue exit), and was very important to the value of the city since it allowed easy access to US-101 and the Golden Gate Bridge from Marincello. Obviously, this small residential street that served fewer than ten houses would be deluged with commuter traffic. A preliminary injunction was issued in favor of the homeowners.

By 1966, the budget for Marincello started to balloon from its original 20 year/$250 million pricetag. The executives of Gulf Oil started to doubt Thomas Frouge and the Gulf Oil Land Development Division, which was funding the project. Infighting within the company ensued, as well as a legal fallout between Frouge and Gulf Oil. In 1967, construction on the site came to a standstill.

This allowed Douglas Ferguson, Bob Praetzel, and Marty Rosen (three lawyers who were already actively following the development and enraged by the legal shortcuts taken by Frouge and his associates to accelerate the construction) to step in and file the most threatening lawsuit to face Marincello.

Representing the City of Sausalito, they filed a lawsuit against Marin County, Frouge, and Gulf Oil, stating that Marincello was improperly zoned back in 1964 and allowed the public only six days to review the zoning instead the legal ten days. This would normally be an insignificant technicality for such a huge project. However, the lawsuit led to discovery of many additional inaccuracies in the Zoning Outlines (including a hastily laid-out plan for an industrial zone within the community) that the County of Marin had approved in 1965.

By 1970, Frouge and Gulf Oil made amends (although Thomas Frouge himself had died at the age of 54 in early January 1969) and were finally about to get their overdue project back on track. However, that same year they were dealt a crushing blow. The court ruled that the entire project was improperly zoned and they would have to throw out their plans and submit brand new ones from scratch. Finally, the day after the court's ruling, the Board of Supervisors of Marin announced that they would no longer support the project.

=== Marincello dies ===
In the late 1960s, the government was conducting a study about creating a national park surrounding the Golden Gate. It was originally conceived to include Alcatraz and the Presidio. Soon, it was realized that the Marin Headlands was a crucial area to complete this national park. Huey Johnson, western director of The Nature Conservancy, met with the Gulf Oil Corporation about selling this valuable land to the park service in early 1970. After Gulf Oil lost their lawsuit, this finally became an attractive option. In 1972, the land was sold to the Nature Conservancy for $6.5 million and then transferred to the newly formed Golden Gate National Recreation Area. The Marincello project was finished, before any buildings could even be put up. In 1976, the Marincello gates at the base of Tennessee Valley, the only remaining architectural evidence of the development, were torn down and removed.

== Marincello today ==
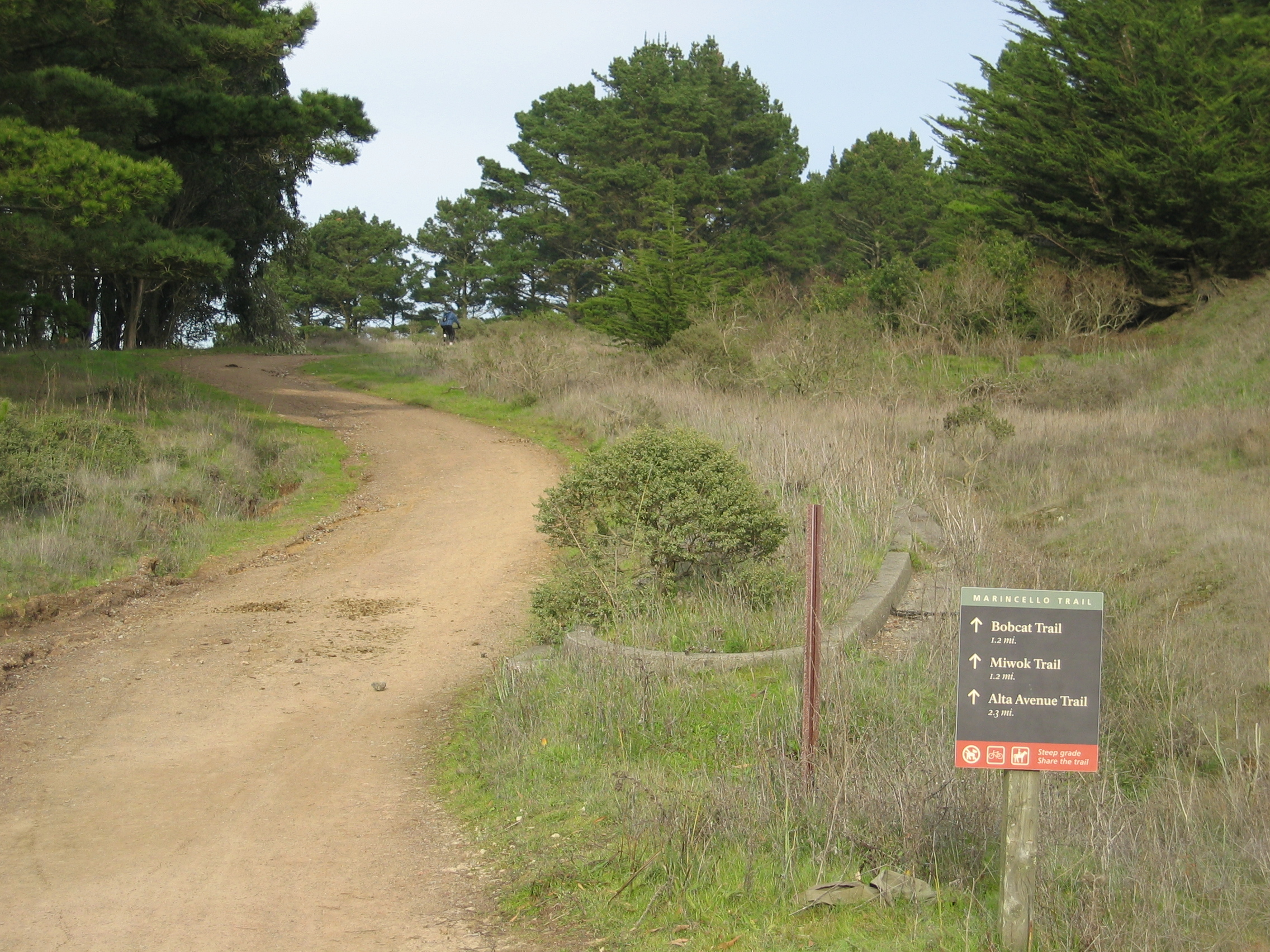
The former main boulevard now stands as the "Marincello Trail."

Although the Marin Headlands currently sits among thousands of acres of virtually untouched and protected open land, some remnants of the 1960s development project still exist. The main boulevard that was built upon the Northwest portion of the area still remains as a dirt road. It is now a popular hiking, biking, and horse-back riding trail, properly named "Marincello Trail." The trail connects to other trails at the top of the Headlands that would have been roads and streets for the planned community.

Rodeo Ave "Exit to Nowhere"

Off Southbound US-101, there is an exit for Rodeo Ave that leads nowhere. It consists of a short highway off-ramp that leads to another dirt road—currently gated to restrict automobile traffic. If Marincello had been built, this dirt road would have been upgraded to a main boulevard to carry traffic in and out of Marincello. Instead, it also became a trail, accessible by foot only, that intersects with the Marincello Trail at the top of the hill.

Today, the Headlands make up part of the Golden Gate National Recreation Area, which at 16 million visitors a year, is one of the country's most popular National Park Service areas.

In 1972, three of the people responsible for blocking the development, Huey Johnson, Douglas Ferguson, and Martin Rosen, founded The Trust for Public Land, an organization dedicated to the creation of parks and protected lands across the United States.

The original median and curb from Marincello Boulevard still remains.

The original median at the beginning of Marincello Trail. The right hand side of the original boulevard has been overgrown with vegetation. This is evidenced by an aerial photo from 1968.
