= Cavallo Point =

Hotel in Marin County, California, US

Coordinates: 37.8377°N 122.4794°W

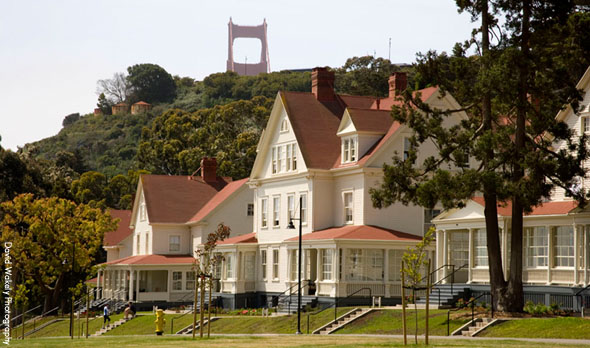
- Cavallo Point at Fort Baker
- Interactive map of the Cavallo Point area
- Hotel chain: Preferred Hotels & Resorts

Website
- www.cavallopoint.com

Cavallo Point is a conference center or hotel in Marin County, California. It is located within Fort Baker in the Golden Gate National Recreation Area. It is also known as the Lodge at the Golden Gate.

It includes building(s) built in 1901, in Colonial Revival style.

It is part of a National Register of Historic Places-listed historic district, Forts Baker, Barry, and Cronkhite.

Architectural Resources Group, an architectural firm which had architectural conservators as staff members, did some work there.

It is listed on the National Registry of the Historic Hotels of America.
