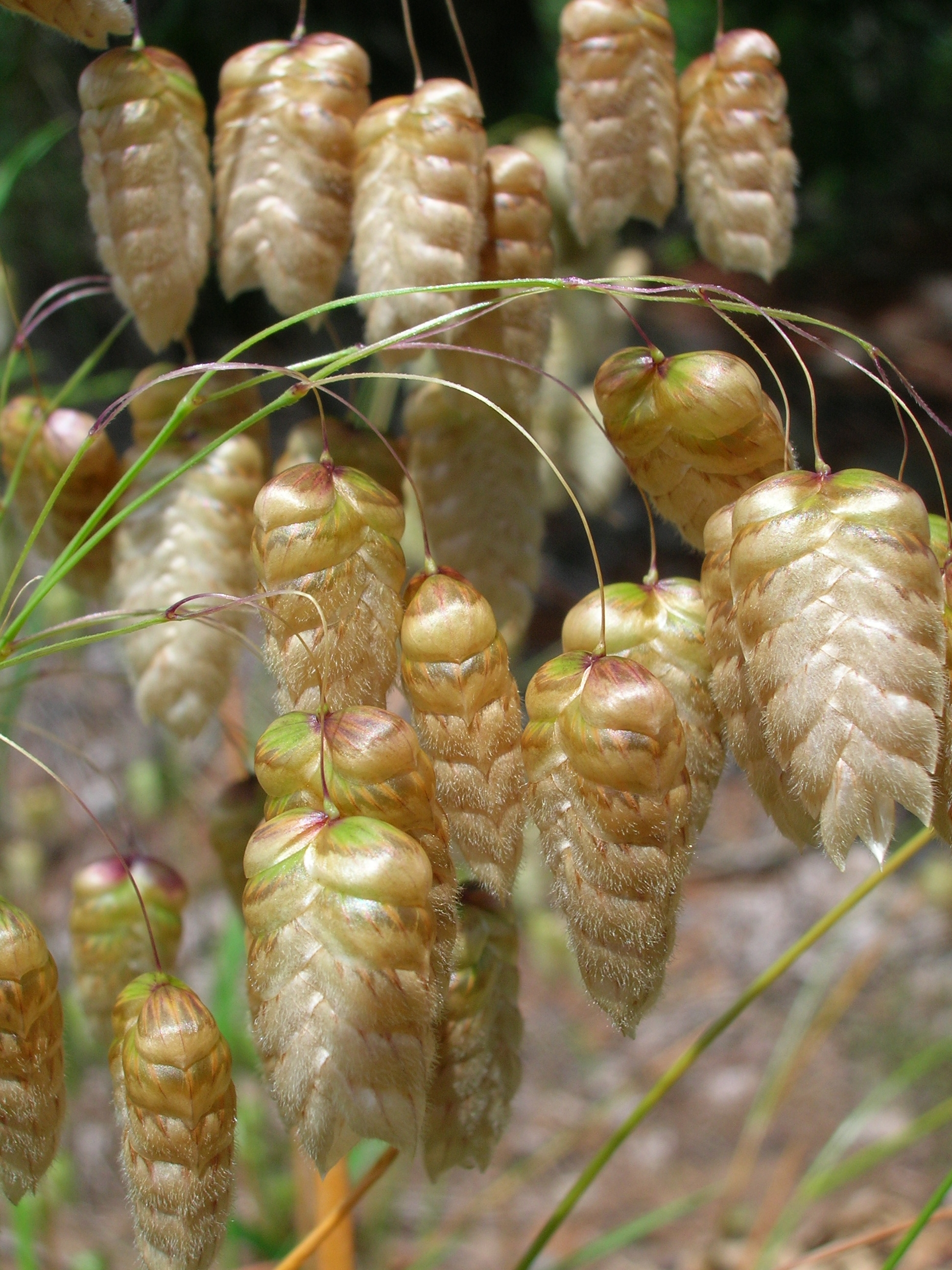

Scientific classification
- Kingdom: Plantae
- Clade: Embryophytes
- Clade: Tracheophytes
- Clade: Angiosperms
- Clade: Monocots
- Clade: Commelinids
- Order: Poales
- Family: Poaceae
- Subfamily: Pooideae
- Genus: Briza
- Species: B. maxima

Binomial name
- Briza maxima L.

= Briza maxima =

Species of grass

Briza maxima is a species of the grass genus Briza. It is native to Northern Africa, Western Asia and Southern Europe and is cultivated or naturalised in the British Isles, the Azores, Australasia, the western United States, Central and South America, and Hawaii.

This species has a large number of common names, including big quaking grass, great quaking grass, greater quaking-grass, large quaking grass, blowfly grass, rattlesnake grass, greater rattlesnake grass, shelly grass, rattle grass, and shell grass.

It grows to a height of 60 cm. Their spikelets resemble those of the unrelated species Bromus briziformis. The seeds and leaves are edible.
