= Redwood Creek Native Plant Nursery =

Redwood Creek Nursery
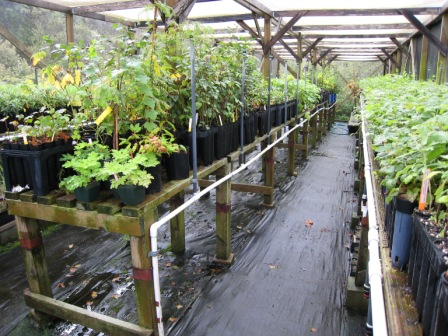

Information
- Location: Marin County, California, USA
- Organization: Golden Gate National Parks Conservancy

Redwood Creek Native Plant Nursery was located just outside the old-growth redwood forest at Muir Woods National Monument. The nursery provided plants for restoration of the creek bank in the lower watershed and impacted areas of the Muir Woods' redwood understory. It was moved to that location in 1992, and closed in 2015.

== Location ==
The Redwood Creek watershed extends from the peaks of Mount Tamalpais, Marin County's tallest mountain, to the Pacific Ocean and is nestled in one of the nation's most densely populated regions. This watershed encompasses an area of less than nine square miles, yet it harbors incredibly diverse ecosystems with a rich assemblage of plant and animal species. Within this small watershed are found grasslands, coastal chaparral, mixed hardwood and old-growth redwood forest, seasonal wetlands, and riparian woodlands that extend in an unbroken mosaic from the mountain's ridge tops to the sea. The watershed is also home to some of the West Coast's most imperiled species, such as coho salmon (Oncorhyncus kisutch), steelhead trout (O. mykiss), northern spotted owl (Strix occidentalis caurina), and the California red-legged frog (Rana aurora draytonii).

The Redwood Creek watershed is 95% public lands and holds Muir Woods National Monument, as well as the communities of Muir Beach and Green Gulch Farm. An indication of its ecological value is that the watershed is one of 25 global biodiversity "hot spots" recognized by the Nature Conservancy and targeted by the global conservation community as key to preserving the world's ecosystem

It is also within the Golden Gate Biosphere Reserve, one of 411 reserves designated by the United Nations Educational, Scientific and Cultural Organization (UNESCO) "Man and the Biosphere" Program to provide a global network representing the world's major ecosystem types.

== Function ==
The Golden Gate National Parks Conservancy runs five native plant nurseries, which have three main goals:

1. Produce high quality container plants for park restoration from local seeds.
2. Create and foster a volunteer program.
3. Educate community members about concepts of community, ecology, and horticulture.

Redwood Creek Nursery began over 20 years ago, returning native plant communities to trampled areas on the "floor" of Muir Woods. In 1997, the Parks Conservancy began providing professional support in nursery management and restoration through a financial partnership with the Golden Gate National Recreation Area. Since that time, the nursery facility has been upgraded and made more ecologically sensitive. More than 80,000 plants have been grown from seed collected in the Redwood Creek watershed. These have then been planted into the watershed, from the upper slopes of Muir Woods to the mouth of Redwood Creek at Muir Beach.

== See also ==
- Biosphere reserve

== See also ==
- Save the Redwoods League
