= Golden Gate National Parks Conservancy =

U.S. nonprofit organization

- Abbreviation: GGNPC
- Formation: 1981
- Type: Nonprofit organization
- Purpose: "To preserve the Golden Gate National Parks, enhance the experiences of park visitors, and build a community dedicated to conserving the parks for the future."
- Headquarters: San Francisco, California
- Location: Fort Mason, Building 201, San Francisco, CA 94123
- Region served: Golden Gate National Recreation Area
- Members: 14,000
- President & CEO: Chris Lehnertz
- Website: parksconservancy.org

The Golden Gate National Parks Conservancy is a nonprofit cooperating association that supports park stewardship and conservation in the Golden Gate National Recreation Area—the most visited national park in the U.S.

Recognized as one of the largest park partners in the country, the Parks Conservancy has provided nearly $300 million in aid to support San Francisco Bay Area parks including the Presidio of San Francisco, Crissy Field, Muir Woods National Monument, Lands End, and Alcatraz Island. The organization has received a Three-Star Charity rating from Charity Navigator.

== About ==
The Parks Conservancy was founded in 1981 as the Golden Gate National Parks Association and changed to its current name in 2003.

Considered a model for urban park management worldwide, the Parks Conservancy's work is made possible through the support of its members and donors, contributions from foundations, businesses, public agencies, and individuals; as well as earned income from the operation of park stores, cafes, and tours. Parks Conservancy-funded projects are visible across the parks' 80,000 acres as part of site transformations, trail improvements, habitat restoration, research and conservation, volunteer and youth engagement, and interpretive and educational programs.

The Parks Conservancy works closely with several partners including the National Park Service (NPS) and the Presidio Trust to accomplish its mission to preserve the Golden Gate National Parks, enhance the experience of park visitors, and build a community dedicated to conserving the parks for the future. The Parks Conservancy is the official support organization for the Golden Gate National Recreation area, and is one of more than 70 such nonprofit organizations working with national parks across the U.S.

Recent projects include the Tamalpais Lands Collaborative, a public-private partnership that brings together the resources, skills, and philanthropy of the National Park Service, California State Parks, Marin Municipal Water District, Marin County Parks, and the Parks Conservancy to support conservation, stewardship, and public enjoyment of the Mount Tamalpais region in Marin County, California. The Parks Conservancy also collaborated with the Presidio Trust and the NPS on Presidio Tunnel Tops, a park that created 14 acres of new national parkland in the Presidio of San Francisco, bridging the new Presidio Parkway tunnel that connects the Golden Gate Bridge to the city street grid.

== Programs ==
The Parks Conservancy has overseen several notable programs, sites, and campaigns, including Alcatraz, Crissy Field, Muir Woods, and the Golden Gate Bridge 75th Anniversary

=== Alcatraz ===
Opened to the public in 1973 by the National Park Service, Alcatraz Island is a significant historical site, and one of the most popular tourist destinations in Northern California with some 1.4 annual visitors. In partnership with the National Park Service, the Parks Conservancy has overseen the $3.5 million revitalization of the island, which has included the restoration of its gardens, the enhancement of visitor amenities and experiences, and the addition of a museum store. Formerly home to the maximum-security prison, the island is located in San Francisco Bay; visitors take a ferry from Pier 33 in San Francisco to reach it. Once there, the Parks Conservancy now offers popular tours, attractions, and merchandise for visitors. Additionally, in partnership the National Park Service, the Parks Conservancy coordinates volunteer programs to ensure the island's restored gardens and wildlife habitats, home to some 20,000 sea birds, are carefully protected.

Among the most popular attractions for visitors is the "Doing Time" audio tour, offered in eleven languages, which provides first-person accounts and interviews with people who experienced Alcatraz, including former corrections officers and inmates. There are also several walking tours including the Alcatraz Night and Historic Gardens tours; the proceeds from these tours are used for restoring and preserving the Golden Gate National Parks and the island itself. The island also has a cellhouse museum store, which showcases genuine items (such as real handcuffs) used in the prison and "Escape from Alcatraz" movie, based on the real 1962 inmate break out. There is a sizable 180-seat theater on Alcatraz that shows a film on the island's complex history. Through the Parks Conservancy's Art in the Parks program, the island hosted "@Large: Ai Weiwei on Alcatraz," an exhibition from September 2014 to April 2015 showcasing installations by Ai Weiwei, the Chinese artist and political activist.

=== Art in the Parks ===
Since 2006, the Parks Conservancy, National Park Service, Presidio Trust, and the Headlands Center for the Arts have brought several art installations to the Golden Gate National Parks. Additional partners have included the San Francisco Museum of Modern Art and We Players, among others. The Art in the Parks program includes the 2014-2015 exhibition "@Large: Ai Weiwei on Alcatraz," and environmental sculptural works by Andy Goldsworthy. Goldsworthy's 2014 piece, "Earth Wall," was built into the historic Officers' Club located in the Presidio; the piece was unveiled as a part of the Presidio's 20th anniversary projects.

Ai Weiwei's @Large featured seven installations across Alcatraz, including 176 portraits of various political exiles and prisoners of conscience, individuals including Edward Snowden, Nelson Mandela, and Martin Luther King Jr. The portraits were made of 1.2 million pieces of Legos and were on display in areas that were once the dining hall, laundry building, and A Block cells of the Island. The artist organized the show without ever visiting the site since the Chinese government restricts his travel. The installation was a joint commission with the For-Site Foundation, a nonprofit with a mission to support "art about place." Past Art in the Parks projects include large-scale sculptures from Mark di Suvero at Crissy Field; podcasts and audio tours from Jeannene Przyblyski, and a 172-foot brush sculpture from Dee Hibbert Jones.

=== Crissy Field ===
Described as offering "one of the great vistas anywhere," and located along a 1.3-mile marsh area next to the Presidio of San Francisco, Crissy Field has longstanding ties to the U.S. military, and underwent an extensive renovation before reopening in 2001. Due to its large, flat, grassy landscape, the site was turned into an airfield and became the home of significant aviation research and development between World War I and II. The site also housed a top-secret Military Intelligence Service Language School. When the military left after the war, it fell into relative disrepair until the National Park Service and Parks Conservancy oversaw its $34 million restoration, completed in 2001, which included a 28-acre re-creation airfield, as a part of the efforts to reinvigorate the Presidio as a national park.

The restoration was made possible through several significant donations, including one in the amount of $13.5 million from the Evelyn and Walter Haas, Jr. Fund. Hargreaves Associates oversaw the project, and redesigned the site to complement the strong winds that shape the existing landscape. The Crissy Field Center, a partnership of the Parks Conservancy, National Park Service, and Presidio Trust, focuses on community engagement; it has provided programs to more than 800,000 students and adults since opening, including some 25,000 schoolchildren. Many of its programs are designated specifically for low-income youths. The restoration has been praised both for its focus on restoring wildlife habitat, and its positive impact for the surrounding community and visitors, with more than one million visitors annually.

=== Golden Gate Bridge 75th Anniversary ===
The Golden Gate Bridge is a suspension bridge that connects San Francisco and Marin County. For the bridge's 75th anniversary in 2012, the Parks Conservancy, in partnership with the National Park Service and the Golden Gate Bridge, Highway and Transportation District, oversaw several celebratory projects to commemorate its opening. These organizations partnered with companies such as the San Francisco Chronicle and Twitter, as well as Genentech and Wells Fargo to commemorate the event. Steering committee members included notable Bay Area leaders and residents, while members of the Honorary Committee included Jack Dorsey, the CEO of Square, Inc.; Chip Bergh, the CEO of Levi Strauss & Co.; and Frank Vega, former publisher of the San Francisco Chronicle.

Events for the 75th anniversary included a large fireworks display, an exhibition at Fort Point known as "International Orange," dancing and music, and a fair to explore sustainability. The Festival events took place on May 27, 2012. The ongoing "Band of Bridges" project won Travel + Leisure's Social Media in Travel + Tourism (SMITTY) award. This yearlong campaign connected some 2,122 participants from around the world to the 75th anniversary tribute; the "social experiment" created thousands of virtual bridges.

=== Institute at the Golden Gate ===
Located in Fort Baker on the Marin side of the Golden Gate Bridge, the Institute at the Golden Gate is a program of the Golden Gate National Parks Conservancy in partnership with the NPS. It conducts research and offers lectures and community activities designed to connect residents to environmental issues related to parks including climate change, national food policy, and more. The institute has partnered with organizations such as the CDC and the National Recreation and Park Association. Many of its events take place at Cavallo Point, the Lodge at the Golden Gate, which has 14,000 square feet of space for meetings and events, and is a LEED certified building. It has won numerous awards for its design.

Past events at the Institute have included their 2011 and 2012 signature Turning the Tide conference, and a 2013 conference, Parks: The New Climate Classroom, which featured filmmakers, academics, and journalists who explored issues of sustainability. In the case of the new food policy program for national parks, the Institute worked with organizations including the Let's Move! initiative to establish better food standards for the 35 million annual meals served at national parks; it now is seeking to implement those ideas on an even larger scale. A 2013 collaboration between numerous agencies led to "Healthy Parks, Healthy People: Bay Area," focused on offering low-cost activities for individuals who are at a high risk for various health problems.

=== Lands End ===
In 2012, the Parks Conservancy and National Park Service oversaw the opening of a new visitor center at Lands End, the Lands End Lookout. The Lookout sits in the northwestern area of San Francisco near the Sutro Baths; it is roughly 4,000 square feet, and was built in conjunction with a series of additional improvements to the area that started in 2011. The Horace W. Goldsmith Foundation, as well as the Richard and Rhoda Goldman Fund, provided funding for the project.

Lands End is a historic site where the Yelamu tribe of Ohlone Native Americans resided. San Francisco entrepreneur Adolph Sutro supported the area's development in the late 19th century, including a Cliff House Railroad, which attracted visitors. Now, the Lands End Lookout offers visitors insight into the natural, cultural, and historic resources of the area, as well as highlighting the building's sustainable design. The site relies on volunteers to restore and maintain native wildlife habitat and the California Coastal Trail.

=== Mount Tamalpais ===
Located in Marin County, Mount Tamalpais (Mt. Tam) encompasses more than 10 square miles of public land and open space, and is the primary source of drinking water for 75% of Marin's population. Established in 2014, the Tamalpais Lands Collaborative (TLC) combines the resources, skills, and expertise of the Golden Gate National Parks Conservancy, National Park Service, Marin Municipal Water District (MMWD), California State Parks, and Marin County Parks to preserve these protected public lands. In November 2014, the TLC launched the One Tam Initiative to help raise awareness of the preservation efforts needed to secure Mt. Tam's future. The efforts include work to promote education, and philanthropy, and to increase support from volunteers.

Specifically, efforts to maintain Mt. Tam are designed to combat the effects of climate change, habitat and biodiversity loss, forest pathogens, and inadequate opportunities for stewardship and learning. Additionally, events and trails on the site have been at or over capacity, prompting the expansion of offerings. The Cataract Trail has as many as 400 visitors each hour during wet season, for instance. Preservation and community outreach projects include the Rare Plant Program, Cataract Trail Restoration, and youth programs designed to facilitate long-term commitment to the mountain.

=== Muir Woods ===
Located in southwest Marin County, this grove of coast redwoods was declared a national monument in 1908 by President Theodore Roosevelt. It is named for the famous naturalist and founder of the Sierra Club, John Muir, and was established after the sudden influx of people into the San Francisco region during the California Gold Rush, prompting efforts to preserve the region's natural habitat. Today, the park is the site of major conservation efforts—it is home to coho salmon and steelhead trout, both of which are threatened species, as well as the northern spotted owl. The Parks Conservancy operates a bookstore at Muir Woods, and supports staff who welcome visitors and provide orientation and interpretation of the national monument.

Muir Woods are perhaps best known for their stunning historic redwoods and paths; these trees are anywhere from 400 to 800 years old. The park has become increasingly popular over the past several years and visitors are encouraged to take public transportation when visiting since parking is limited. It has also become something of a retreat for residents and visitors, and has been referenced for its historical beauty by writers such as Alan Garner.

=== Presidio of San Francisco ===
The Presidio of San Francisco is a 1,491-acre national park at the northern edge of the San Francisco Peninsula. The Army transferred the land to the NPS in 1994, and the Presidio Trust was established to manage the parcel in 1996.

A plan to renovate a 13-acre area that will replace the elevated Doyle Drive highway and connect the Presidio's historic core with the San Francisco Bay waterfront, known as the New Presidio Parklands Project, is also currently underway. The project is a joint operation between the Presidio Trust, the National Park Service, and the Parks Conservancy. It calls for 10 acres of landscaping that will run above road tunnels, a plaza for the Presidio Visitor Center, and a "Learning Landscape" that will incorporate the new campus for Crissy Field Center.

In 2014, New York's James Corner Field Operations, which was the project lead for New York's highly successful High Line elevated park, was chosen to oversee the design. The San Francisco-based architecture firm EHDD will also work on the project. There are currently several variations on what form the final project will take, and the firm and partners are seeking community input to choose a direction.

In 2012 the Presidio Trust issued a Request for Concept Proposals for transforming the site of the former Commissary (currently home to the Sports Basement) at mid-Crissy Field into a "cultural institution." The finalists in the RFP process were the Lucas Cultural Arts Museum (proposed by filmmaker George Lucas), The Bridge/Sustainability Institute (Chora Group/WRNS), and the Presidio Exchange (Golden Gate National Parks Conservancy). In February 2014, the Presidio Trust Board of Directors ultimately decided not to pursue any of the three options for the site.

The transformation of the Presidio into a national park has been substantially boosted by the Evelyn and Walter Haas, Jr. Fund, which made a historic gift of $15 million in 2007 to create a world-class network of trails, bikeways, and overlooks, and dramatically expand and renovate the Rob Hill Campground. Camping at the Presidio programs use the site to introduce underserved youth to nature and the outdoors.

== See also ==
- Golden Gate Raptor Observatory
- Redwood Creek Native Plant Nursery
