= Hawk Hill =

Hawk Hill may refer to:

- Hawk Hill, California, a bird-watching site in the Marin Headlands
- Hawk Hill, the campus of Saint Joseph's University
- Hawk Hill (New York), an elevation in Otsego County, New York
