= Golden Gate Raptor Observatory =

Bird research organization in California

Coordinates: 37.8326°N 122.5377°W

- Established: 1985
- Location(s): Bldg 1064, Fort Cronkhite, Sausalito, CA 94965 ggro@parksconservancy.org 415-331-0730
- Parent organization: Golden Gate National Parks Conservancy; National Park Service
- Staff: Director: Allen Fish; Banding Manager: Teresa Ely; Hawkwatch Manager: Stephen Wilson; Operations Manager: Kelsie McInnis
- Volunteers: 280+
- Website: www.ggro.org
- Monitoring the Pacific coast raptor migration through citizen science

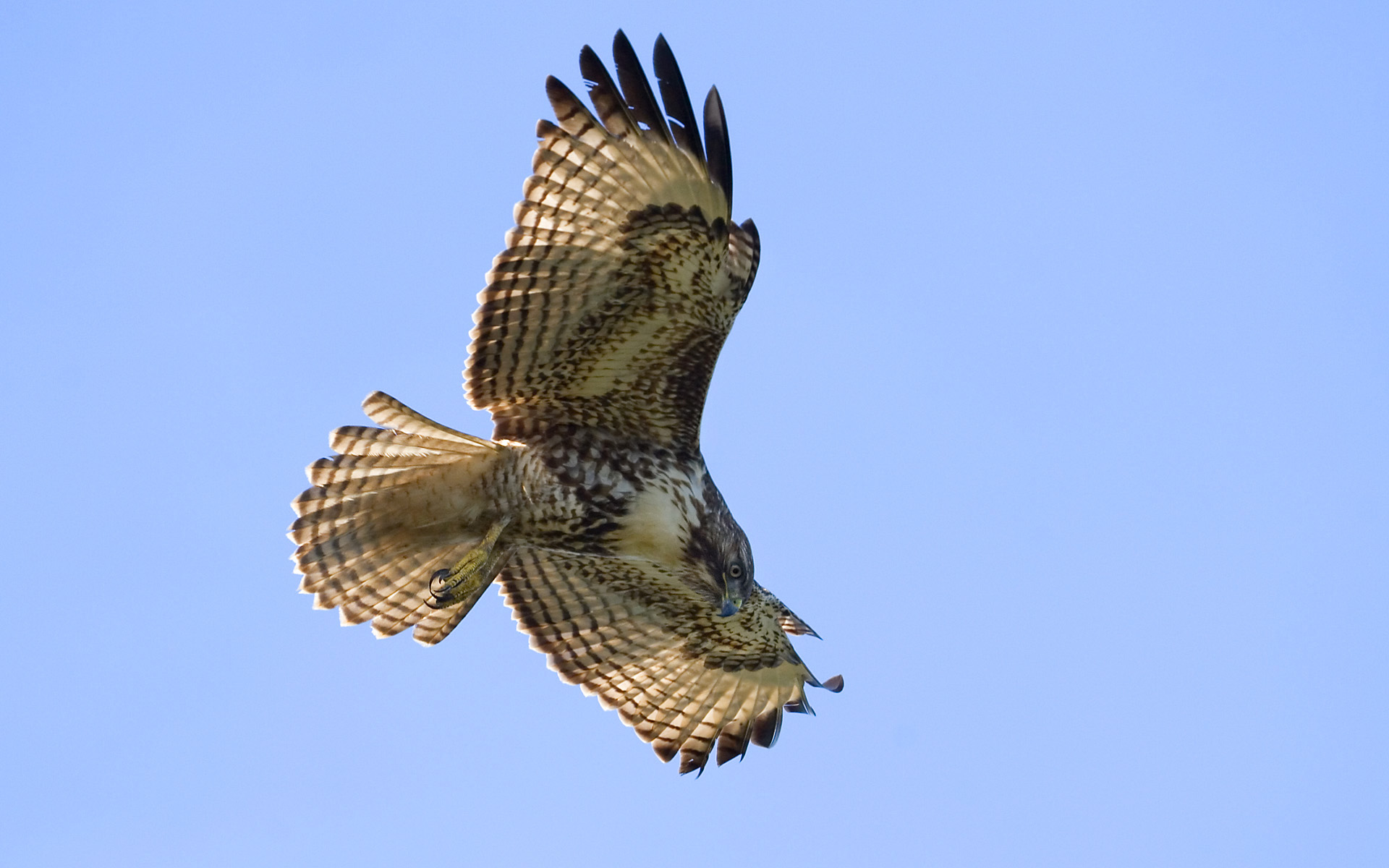
A juvenile red-tailed hawk in the Marin Headlands

The Golden Gate Raptor Observatory (GGRO) is a long-term program of the Golden Gate National Parks Conservancy in cooperation with the National Park Service. The GGRO's mission is to study migrating birds of prey along the Pacific coast and to inspire the preservation of raptor populations in California. Established in 1985, it is located in the Marin Headlands, just north of San Francisco, California. The Raptor Observatory operates under the philosophy that incorporating citizens into the process of gathering scientific data will deepen long-term conservation results. Consequently, the organization's small staff is supported by the work of 280+ highly trained volunteers, coming from all different disciplines. The GGRO publishes an annual report, contributes annual results to national databases, and collaborates on various research projects with local universities.

== Location ==
The GGRO programs center around Hawk Hill, one of the highest points (940 feet elevation) immediately above the Golden Gate on the north sides, in Marin County. This publicly accessible site, a center-point of the Golden Gate National Recreation Area, offers visitors a spectacular vista of the San Francisco Bay Area, as well as the best view of the autumn hawk migration.

While moving toward the Marin peninsula's southern tip in the Headlands, the "front" of migrating raptors is squeezed by San Francisco Bay on the east and the Pacific Ocean on the west. A preference for flying over land keeps many hawks from readily flying over open water. Consequently, many raptors end up flying over Hawk Hill as they negotiate the two-mile gap to San Francisco, creating a raptor migration thoroughfare.

=== Visiting ===
Limited parking is available at the base of Hawk Hill. Visitors can walk a short (0.15 mile) but steep route, or take a longer (0.25 mile), less steep path to reach the summit of Hawk Hill.

== Programs ==
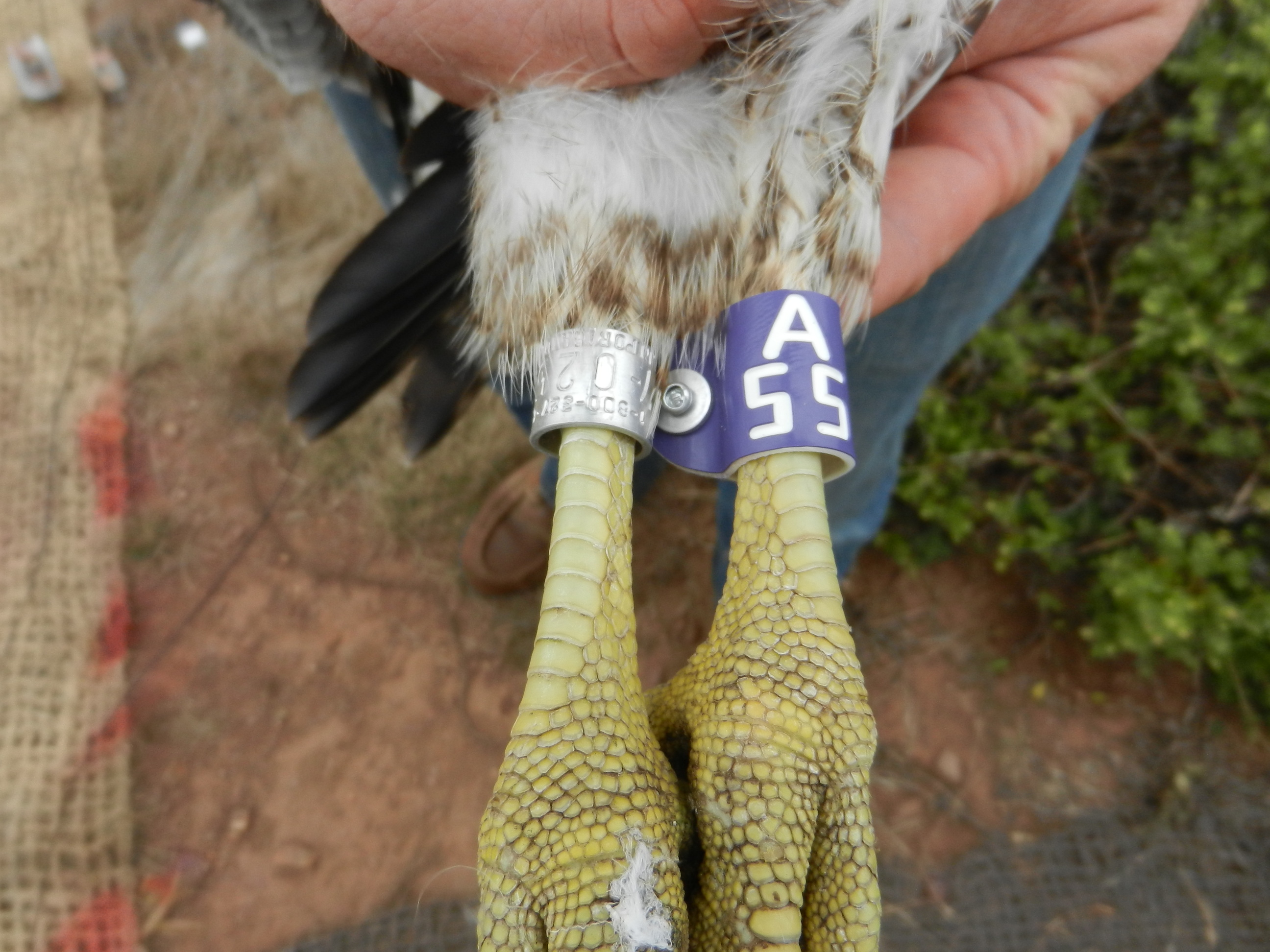
A bird banded by the Raptor Observatory

The GGRO has three ways of monitoring the fall migration of raptors: hawk counting (Hawkwatch), hawk banding, and radio-tracking (Telemetry).

GGRO offers free public programs every Saturday and Sunday at noon in September and October, peak migration season (weather permitting: rain or fog cancels). The Hawk Talk begins at noon—a GGRO educator speaks about hawk migration and identification, and the long-term raptor monitoring at the GGRO. Then midway through, a banding volunteer brings up a newly banded hawk, talks about the banding program, shows everyone the hawk, and lets it go in front of the crowd. It is a great way to learn about hawks and see one up close.

== Migration season ==
To track the fall migration, the GGRO starts its programs annually in mid-August and ends them mid-December. At the migration's peak in late September/early October, as many as 1,000 raptors a day may be counted overhead.

The Golden Gate migration is primarily one of diurnal raptors—hawks, kites, falcons, eagles, vultures, osprey, and harriers—with an average of nineteen raptor species appearing annually. In addition, a small range of non-raptorial migrants appear over the Marin Headlands in the autumn; this includes three species of swift, six species of swallow, and band-tailed pigeons, among dozens of avian species.

=== Migration timeline ===
Species	Peak Migration Time	Average # of Sightings/Year (2003–2014)
Red-tailed Hawk	September and November	8,947
Red-shouldered Hawk	September–October	463
Broad-winged Hawk	Mid-September–Mid-October	215
Rough-legged Hawk	November	6
Swainson's Hawk	September–October	7
Ferruginous Hawk	September–November	21
Cooper's Hawk	September–October	2,435
Sharp-shinned Hawk	September–October	3,945
Northern Goshawk	October–November	1
American Kestrel	August–December	482
Peregrine Falcon	Late-September–December	237
Prairie Falcon	August–September	6
Merlin	October	178
Osprey	August–Mid-October	93
Turkey Vulture	August–December	8,434
Northern Harrier	October–December	618
White-tailed Kite	October	97
Golden Eagle	Late-September–October	18
Bald Eagle	Late-October–November	6
