= Redwood Creek (Marin County) =

Stream in Marin County, California

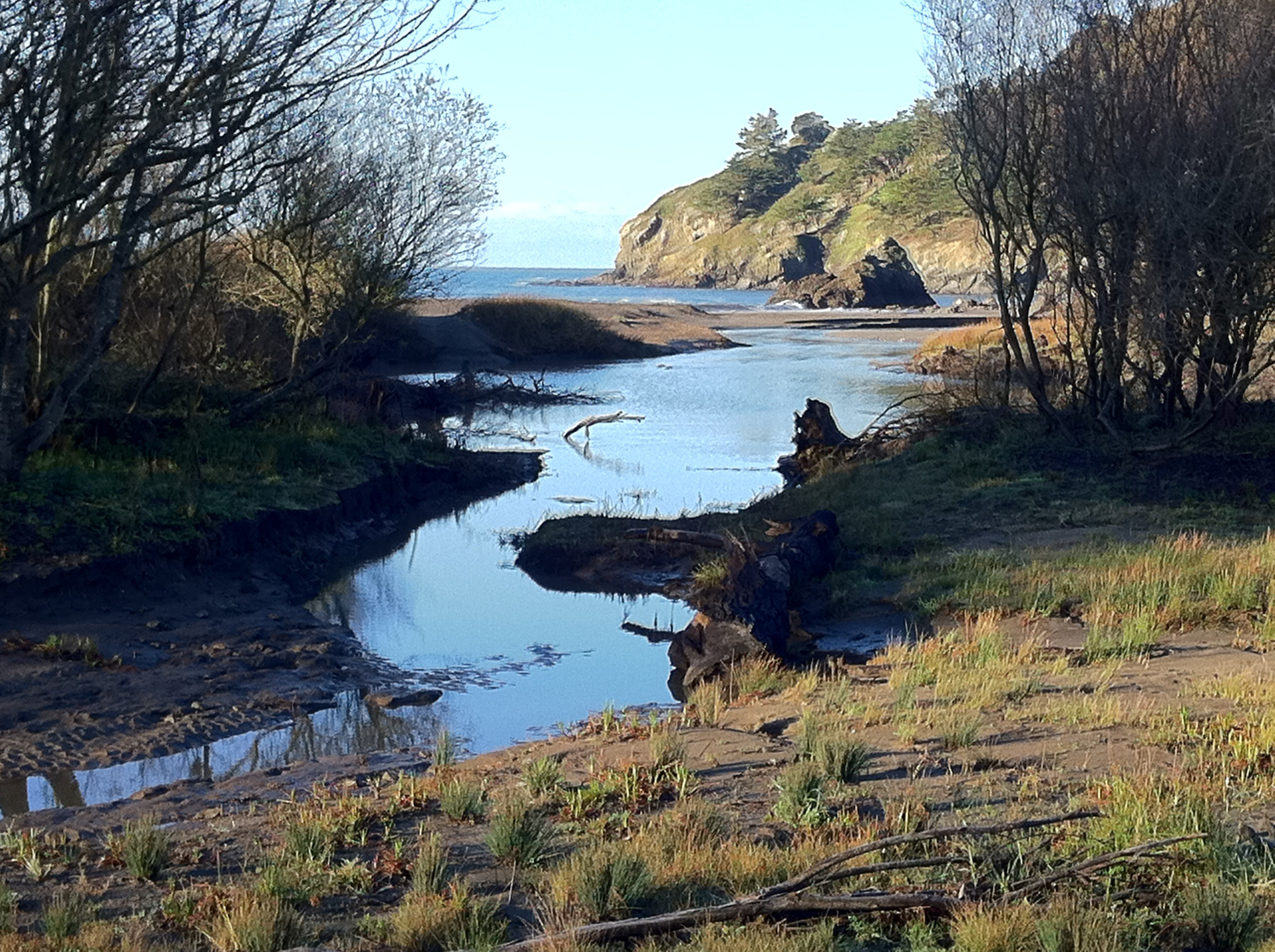
- Redwood Creek flowing west to its mouth at Muir Beach

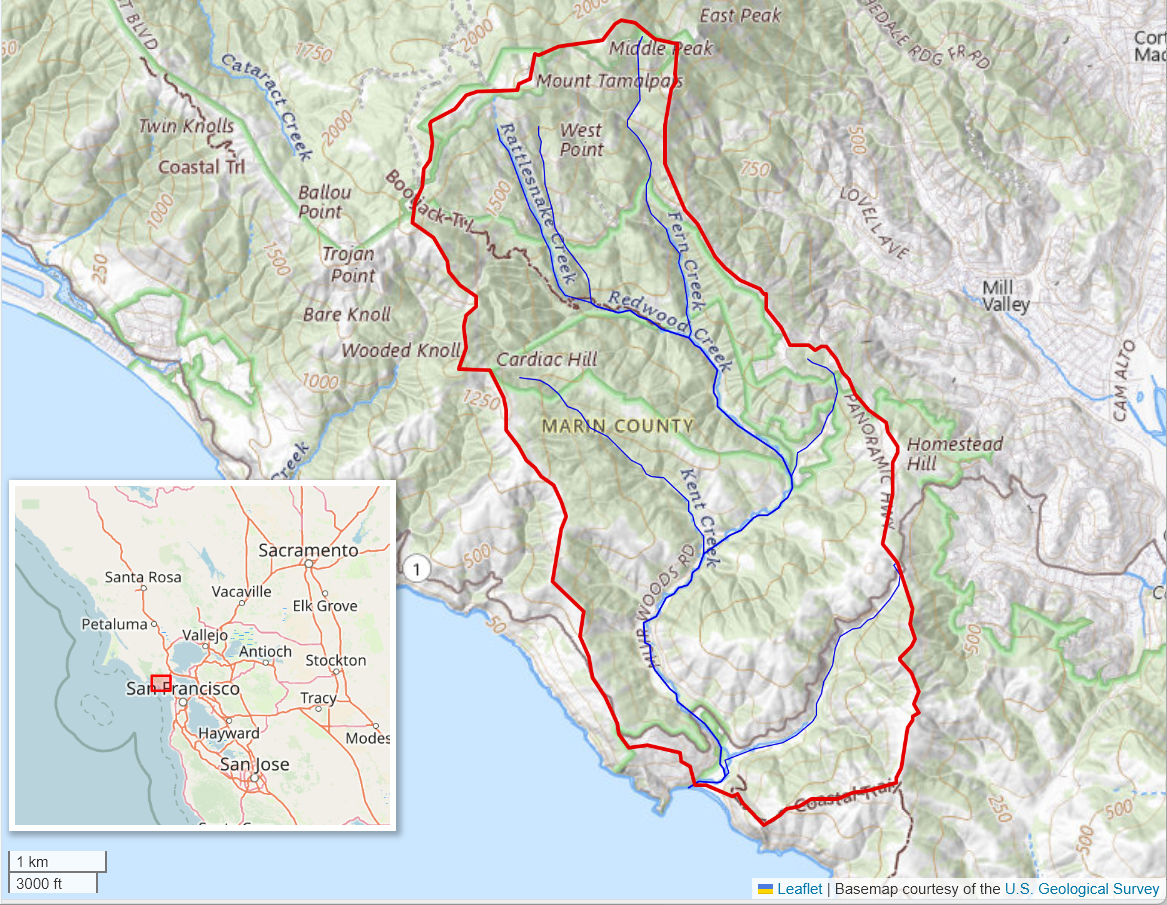
- Redwood Creek Watershed (Interactive Map)

Location
- Country: United States
- State: California
- Region: Marin County

Physical characteristics
- Source: Mount Tamalpais confluence of Bootjack, Rattlesnake and Spike Buck Creeks
  - coordinates: 37°54′14″N 122°35′22″W
- Mouth: Pacific Ocean
  - location: Muir Beach, California
  - coordinates: 37°51′35″N 122°34′40″W
  - elevation: 0 ft (0 m)
- Length: 4.7 mi (7.6 km)
- Basin size: 7 mi^{2} (18 km^{2})

Basin features
- Tributaries
  - left: Fern Creek, Green Gulch Creek
  - right: Kent Creek

Redwood Creek is a mostly perennial stream in Marin County, California. 4.7 miles (7.6 km) long, it drains a 7-square-mile (18 km^{2}) watershed which includes the Muir Woods National Monument, and reaches the Pacific Ocean north of the Golden Gate at Muir Beach.

== History ==
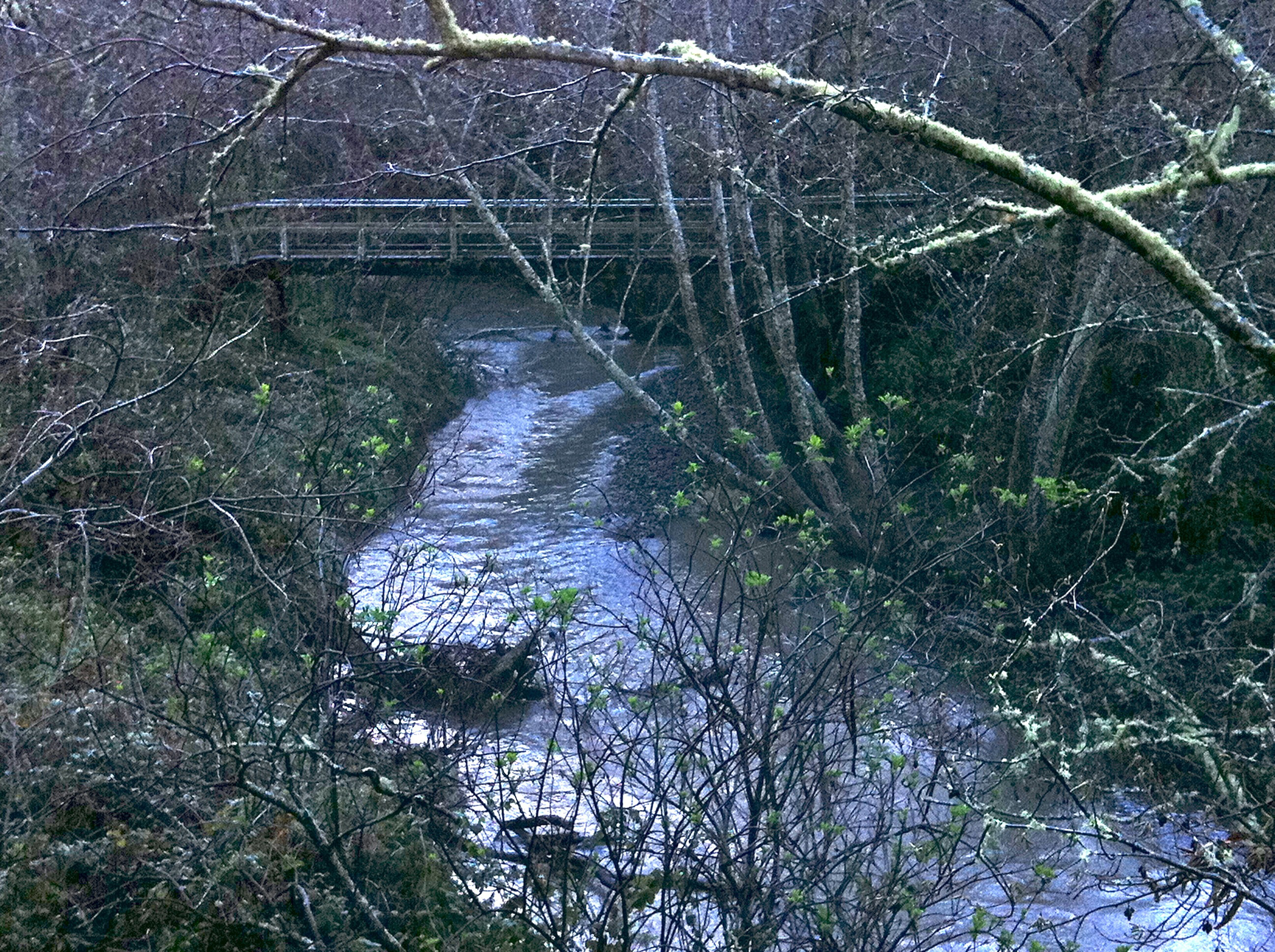
Redwood Creek about one mile below Muir Woods National Monument

At the time of European discovery, the watershed was inhabited by the Coast Miwok, of which the local Huimen tribe was one of fifteen independent Miwok tribes in Marin and southern Sonoma counties. The indigenous archeological site named CA-MRN-33 on the edge of Big Lagoon is listed on the National Register of Historic Places as the Muir Beach Historical Site. The Banducci family grew hay and flowers on a 170-acre (0.69 km^{2}) parcel 1/2 mile upstream from the lagoon, and constructed levees along the right banks in 1948–1949 to prevent overbank flooding. These historical actions created an artificially-straight, constrained stream with relatively little habitat heterogeneity, nicknamed the "Bowling Alley" reach. The NPS acquired this property in 1980, with an agreement allowing the Banduccis to continue farming until 1995. In 1945, George Wheelwright, a co-founder of Polaroid, purchased the Green Gulch Farm and Muir Beach where he created pasture by constructing drainage channels, levees, a dam and a large drainage channel along Redwood Creek. In 1967, Wheelwright donated the Muir Beach area to the California State Parks who built a large parking lot in the current location by the beach. In 1972, Wheelwright sold the Green Gulch Farm to Zentatsu Richard Baker who transformed the ranch into the Green Gulch Farm Zen Center.

== Habitat and wildlife ==
Redwood Creek provides a critical spawning and rearing habitat for coho or silver salmon (Oncorhynchus kisutch), coastal cutthroat (Oncorhynchus clarki clarki) and steelhead trout (Oncorhynchus mykiss), each of them federally listed species. The creek is near the southernmost limit of coho habitat and the fish have never been stocked, so they have a distinctive DNA. The Redwood Creek salmon are Central California Coast coho salmon evolutionarily significant unit (ESU) which have been listed as federally threatened species since October 1996 and as federally endangered species in June 2005. Coho migrate from the ocean back to freshwater for a single chance at reproduction, generally after two years in the ocean. The spawning migrations begin after heavy late fall or winter rains breach the sandbar at Muir Beach allowing the fish to move upstream (usually in December and January). No salmon were seen in the 2007-2008 winter run, nor the 2008-2009 winter run. Evidence points to exhaustion of smolt oversummering in the creek due to a loss of large woody debris and deep pools where young salmon can rest. Starting in 2009, the National Park Service will begin restoring Muir Beach to create a functional, self-sustaining ecosystem and improve visitor access. The intervention was almost too late, since the coho only has a three-year life span. Fortunately, as of January, 2010 and for the first time in three years, an estimated 45 coho swam up Redwood Creek to spawn, creating 23 redds or clusters of eggs. In 2011, 11 live adult coho and 1 coho carcass was observed, along with three redds, a modest increase over the 2007-2008 spawning season. Statewide the coho population is 1% of its levels in the 1940s and the fish have vanished from 90% of the streams they formally visited. The Watershed Alliance of Marin reported that no salmon returned to spawn in 2014, prompting concerns that the fish may now be locally extinct. Three adult male coho captured from the creek as juveniles in 2014 were released with three Olema Creek females as part of California Department of Fish and Wildlife operation "coho jumpstart", and at least one of the latter was observed to spawn, raising hopes of a return of a viable spawning run in Redwood Creek.

In fall of 2003, the NPS completed the first phase of the Banducci Site restoration project, about 1 km upstream from the creek's mouth at Muir Beach. Artificial log jams were constructed using downed Eucalyptus trees and breaching the constraining levees to reconnect the channel and floodplain. The primary purpose of the instream project was to create rearing pools for juvenile salmonids. NPS also removed invasive, non-native vegetation in the riparian corridor, and replaced it with native vegetation to enhance nesting habitat for resident and migrant riparian songbirds. The current phase of the Redwood Creek Restoration Project, begun in 2009, is an attempt to restore the 46-acre creek floodplain. It includes creation of a new 650 foot meandering channel with three side-channels, in an attempt to restore the historic Big Lagoon, which according to 1850 maps, extended all the way back to the present Pelican Inn. Once the planted native vegetation takes hold on the new stream banks, the current parking lot will be rotated 90 degrees and the new channel connected.

Other rare species living in the watershed include the northern spotted owl (Strix occidentalis caurina) and the California red-legged frog (Rana aurora draytonii). In late 2009 the NPS excavated a pond in a pasture at Green Gulch Farm to provide habitat for the dwindling California red-legged frog population, the only one in the watershed.

River otter (Lontra canadensis) were spotted in Redwood Creek in 1996, and return every year to eat steelhead trout. River otter were not listed as native to Marin County in Grinnell's 1937 Fur-bearing Mammals of California.

== Watershed ==
Redwood Creek is formed by the confluence Rattlesnake Creek and Spike Buck Creeks at elevation 341 feet (104 m) on the southern flanks of Mount Tamalpais, however its tributaries begin on the peak at about 2,000 feet (610 m). Mainstem tributaries in descending order include Fern Creek, anadromous Kent Creek, and Green Gulch Creek. Prior to the land use changes that followed European colonization of the watershed, a large intermittently tidal lagoon occurred at the mouth of Redwood Creek. This lagoon once covered an area of approximately 25 acres (0.10 km^{2}); only a remnant of the lagoon remains today.

== Bridges ==
Redwood Creek is spanned by several bridges:

- at Muir Woods Road 0.7 miles (1.1 km) north of State Route 1, a concrete continuous slab built in 1958
- at milepost 6.02 on State Route 1, a concrete culvert built in 1926 and reconstructed in 1970
- at Pacific Way, 0.09 miles (140 m) south of State Route 1, concrete span built in 1956
- at Muir Woods Road 2.0 miles (3.2 km) north of State Route 1, a concrete tee beam built in 1946

== See also ==
- List of watercourses in the San Francisco Bay Area
- Redwood Creek Native Plant Nursery
