= Muir Woods National Monument =

United States National Monument in California

- IUCN category III (natural monument or feature)
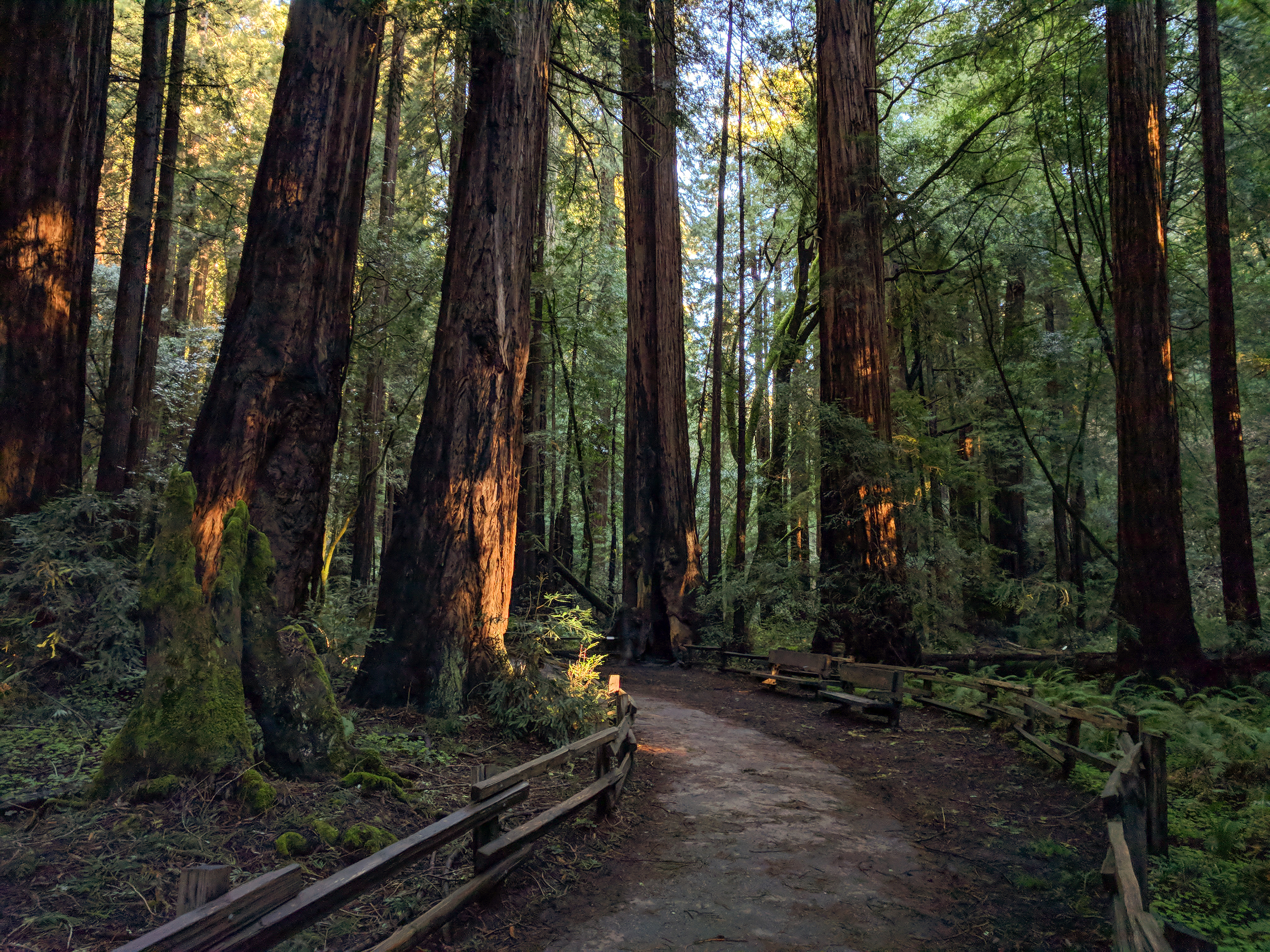
- Redwood trees at the Muir Woods National Monument
- Interactive map of Muir Woods National Monument
- Location: Marin County, California, U.S.
- Nearest city: Mill Valley, CA
- Coordinates: 37°53′31″N 122°34′15″W
- Area: 554 acres (224 ha)
- Created: January 9, 1908
- Visitors: 798,625 (in 2022)
- Governing body: National Park Service
- Website: Muir Woods National Monument

U.S. National Register of Historic Places
- Designated: January 9, 2008
- Reference no.: 07001396

Muir Woods National Monument (/mjʊər/ MURE) is a United States national monument managed by the National Park Service and named after naturalist John Muir. It is located on Mount Tamalpais near the Pacific coast in southwestern Marin County, California. The Monument is part of the Golden Gate National Recreation Area, and is 12 miles (19 km) north of San Francisco. It protects 554 acres (224 ha), of which 240 acres (97 ha) are old-growth coast redwood (Sequoia sempervirens) forests, one of the few such stands remaining in the San Francisco Bay Area.

== Geography ==
=== Ecosystem ===
The Muir Woods National Monument is an old-growth coastal redwood forest in a canyon situated on the western slope of Mount Tamalpais, which rises to 2,571 feet. Because it faces and is in close proximity to the Pacific Ocean, the forest is regularly shrouded in a thick, coastal marine layer fog in the summer, contributing to a wet environment that encourages vigorous plant growth. The fog is also vital for the growth of the redwoods as they use moisture from the fog during drought seasons, particularly during dry summers. During the winter, substantial rainfall soaks the ground, creating the damp environment these trees prefer, as they naturally flourish near rivers and streams.

Muir Woods National Monument

Climate chart (precipitation, max. and min. temperature)
J	F	M	A	M	J	J	A	S	O	N	D
64 12 7	74 16 10	86 20 9	45 20 9	1 17 10	4 20 12	1 23 14	2 22 14	10 27 13	25 23 12	111 14 8	177 9 6
- █ Average max. and min. temperatures in °C
- █ Precipitation totals in mm
Imperial conversion
J	F	M	A	M	J	J	A	S	O	N	D
2.5 54 45	2.9 61 50	3.4 68 48	1.8 68 48	0 63 50	0.2 68 54	0 73 57	0.1 72 57	0.4 81 55	1 73 54	4.4 57 46	7 48 43
- █ Average max. and min. temperatures in °F
- █ Precipitation totals in inches

=== Climate ===
The monument remains cool and moist year-round with daytime temperatures averaging between 40 and 70 degrees Fahrenheit (4 to 21 °C). Rainfall is heavy during the winter, and summers are almost completely dry, with the exception of fog drip caused by the fog passing through the trees. Annual precipitation in the park ranges from 39.4 inches (1,000 mm) in the lower valley to 47.2 inches (1,200 mm) higher up in the mountain slopes.

=== Soils and bedrock ===
The redwoods grow on brown humus-rich loam, which may be gravelly, stony or, somewhat sandy. This soil has been assigned to the Centissima series, which is always found on sloping ground. It is well-drained, moderately deep, and slightly to moderately acidic. It has developed from a mélange in the Franciscan Formation. More open areas of the park have shallow gravelly loam of the Barnabe series, or deep hard loam of the Cronkhite series.

== History ==
=== Background ===
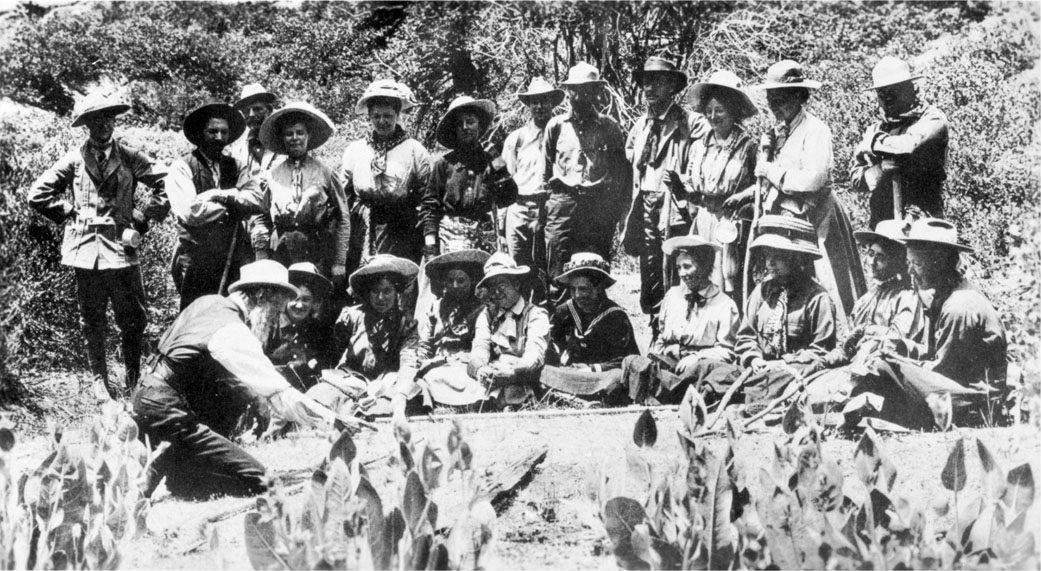
John Muir, lower left foreground, explaining the site to Mildred Lewis and friends at Muir Woods, before 1914

The first fossils of Sequoia sempervirens, also known as Coast Redwood, can be traced back to the Jurassic period, more than 200 million years ago. Redwood forests grew throughout the Northern Hemisphere. Before commercial logging began in the mid-nineteenth century as a result of the Gold Rush, redwood forests occurred naturally, covering an estimated 810,000 ha (2,000,000 acres) extending from Oregon in the north to south of Big Sur in Monterey County, California. By 2023, only 5% of the historic range of old-growth along the coast remains, shrunk to a strip of 450 miles along the coast. Trees in the coast redwood forests are young.

=== Redwood Canyon ===
Because of its proximity to San Francisco, in the mid-1880s, redwoods on Mount Tamalpais were heavily logged to build the city and later, in 1906, to rebuild it. The redwood in Muir's woods, in what was then called Redwood Canyon, on Mount Tamalpais' steep slope, were spared because they were too difficult to reach for logging.

In 1903, William Kent chaired a meeting attended by the chiefs of the U.S. Forest Service and the U.S. Biological Survey. The group discussed a proposal for a 12,000-acre park from the mountain to the sea, on land owned by ranchers and the Tamalpais Land and Water Company. In 1905, using money borrowed from a banker friend, the Kents bought 611 acres of Redwood Canyon within this area on the southwestern side of Mount Tamalpais to thwart logging, protect the redwood forests, and provide visitors’ accommodations. Two years later, their plan to save the primeval redwood groves of Redwood Creek was threatened when the North Coast Water Company (successor to the Tamalpais Land and Water Company) began condemnation proceedings on 47 acres of the Kents' private acreage in order to dam the creek and create a reservoir to provide a water supply for Sausalito. But William Kent learned about America’s first preservation law, the Antiquities Act of 1906: it allowed the government to accept gifts from private citizens and gave the president the ability to create national monuments by proclamation. Kent wrote to President Theodore Roosevelt and offered to donate 298 acres to the nation. Roosevelt accepted, and in 1908 Muir Woods became a national monument. Kent insisted that the park be named for John Muir, whose western explorations, political efforts, and writing had so increased our country’s awareness of its natural treasures. With later land acquisi- tions, nearly all of them Kent family gifts, the monument grew and now protects 560 acres, most of it virgin redwood forest. William Kent was elected to Congress in 1910 and served for three terms. During his time in Washington, he helped create the National Park Service.

Concerns about protecting Redwood Canyon had already been raised in the early 20th century with conservationists such as U.S. Congressman, William Kent, his wife, Elizabeth Thacher Kent; a banker at Bank of California, Lovell White and his wife, Laura Lyon White; and Canadian-American botanist and conservationist, Alice Eastwood, procurator and Head of the Department of Botany, at the California Academy of Sciences in San Francisco.

By 1904, influential women from the San Francisco Bay Area had organized to purchase more forest, this time owned by the North Coast Water Company, which was under pressure from its shareholders to sell the land to another private entity. A key organizer and advocate was Alice Eastwood, who worked as a curator at the California Academy of Sciences. She and others spearheaded a drive to raise $80,000 to buy the land...

The Kents purchased 611 acres (247 ha) of land from the Tamalpais Land and Water Company for $45,000 in 1905 with the goal of protecting the redwoods and the mountain above them. The deal was facilitated by White and his activist wife.

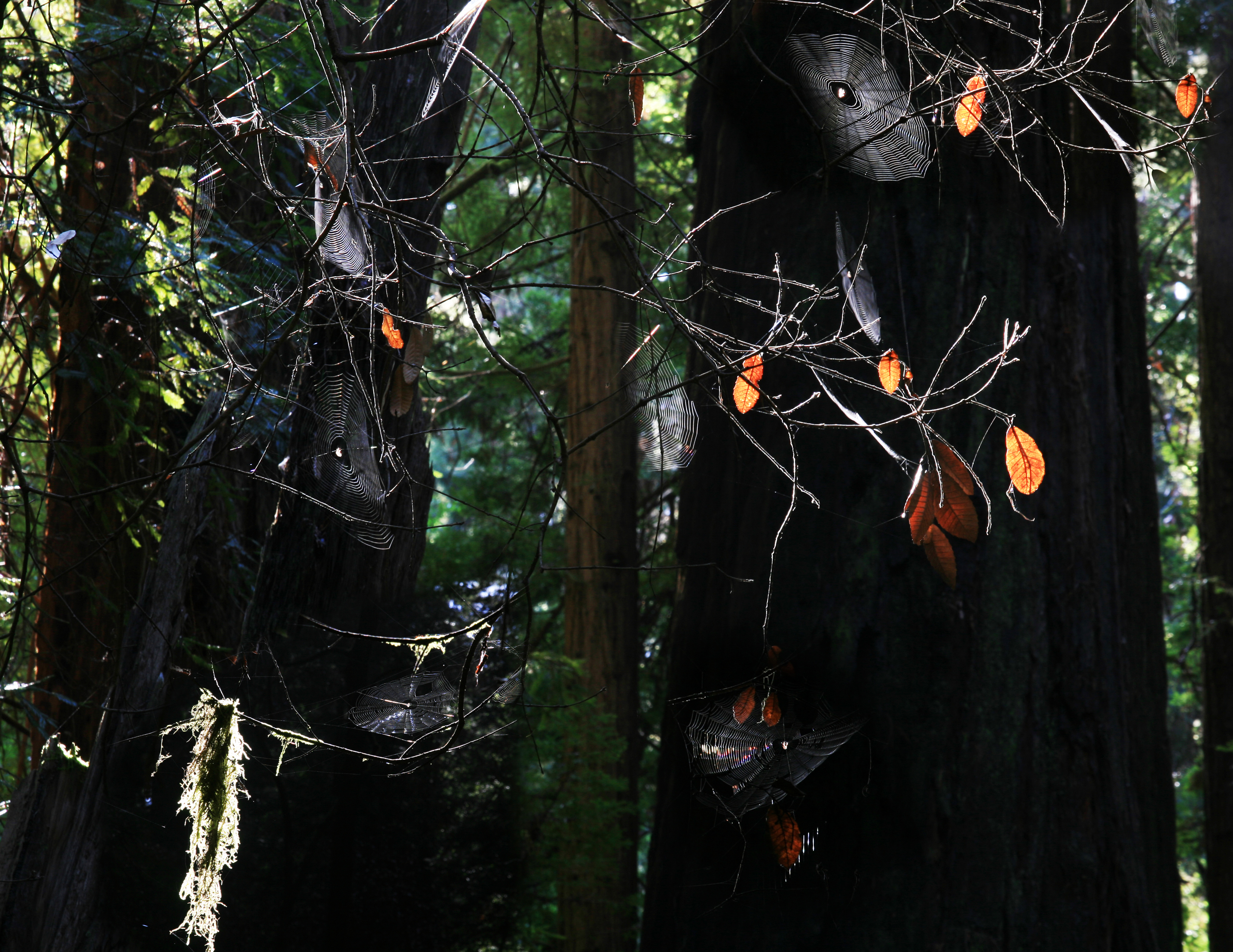
Sunlight on leaves and spider webs in Muir Woods

According to the U.S. National Park Service, the Canadian-American botanist and conservationist, Alice Eastwood (1859-1953), worked to protect and maintain numerous redwood forests in California, including in Muir Woods National Monument, Mount Tamalpais State Park, and the Alice Eastwood Memorial Grove, a redwood grove in Humboldt County. Eastwood came to San Francisco in 1893 to work at the California Academy of Sciences as a curator and worked there for over 50 years.

In 1907, a water company in nearby Sausalito planned to dam Redwood Creek, thereby flooding the valley. When Kent objected to the plan, the water company threatened to use eminent domain and took him to court to attempt to force the project to move ahead. Kent sidestepped the water company's plot by donating 295 acres (119 ha) of the redwood forest to the federal government, thus bypassing the local courts.

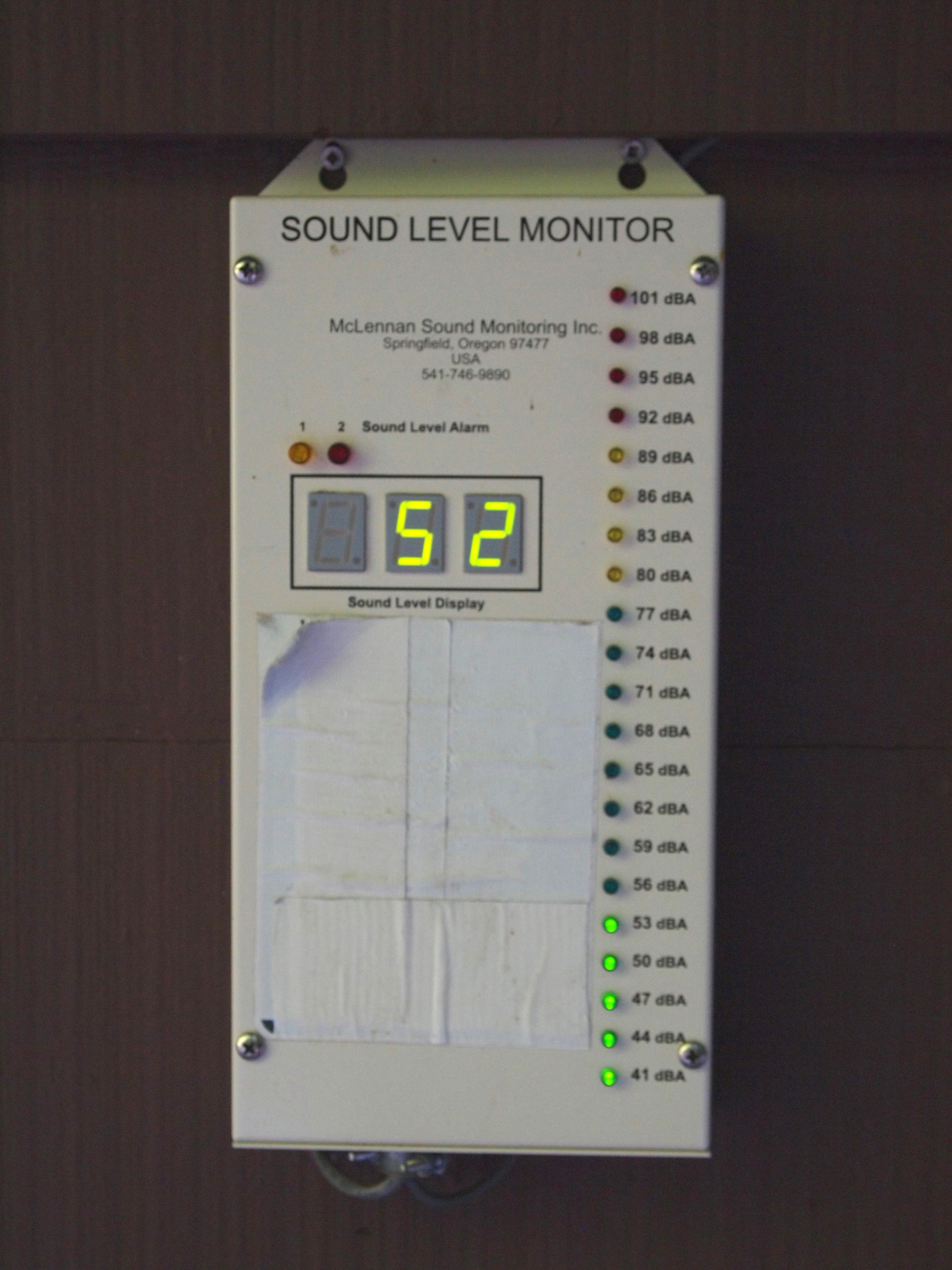
A Sound Level Monitor at Muir Woods National Monument

The Mount Tamalpais and Muir Woods Railway began to carry passengers to the redwood grove in 1907, with trains turning off the mainline track onto a spur at Mesa Junction. This brought the first sightseeing groups to the grove.

=== Muir Woods ===
Muir Woods became a national monument on January 9, 1908, before the National Park Service existed, when it was signed into law under the Antiquities Act by President Theodore Roosevelt. The Kents bought Redwood Canyon to protect and preserve it and worked to get Roosevelt to declare it a monument. In legislation written to protect Muir Woods, it was described as, "of extraordinary scientific interest and importance because of the primeval character of the forest in which it is located, and of the character, age, and size of the trees". Once declared a national monument, Muir Woods was immediately protected and placed under the care of the United States Government. The Antiquities Act was the first of its kind to provide protection for natural resources.

The original suggested name of the monument was the Kent Monument, but Kent insisted the monument be named after naturalist John Muir, whose environmental campaigns helped to establish the National Park system, and President Roosevelt agreed with this proposition.

Kent and Muir had become friends over shared views of wilderness preservation, but Kent's later support for the flooding of Hetch Hetchy caused Muir to end their friendship.

In December 1928, the Kent Memorial was erected at the Kent Tree in Fern Canyon. This tree, a Douglas fir, not a redwood, was said to be Kent's favorite. Due to its height of 280 feet (85 m) and location on a slope, the tree leaned towards the valley for more than 100 years. Storms in the El Niño years of 1981 and 1982 caused the tree to tilt even more and took out the top 40 feet (12 m) of the tree. During the winter of 2002–03, many storms brought high winds to Muir Woods, causing the tree to lean so much that a fissure developed in January 2003. This fissure grew larger as the tree slowly leaned more and more, forcing the closure of some trails. On March 18, 2003, at around 8:28 pm, the tree fell, damaging several other trees nearby. The closed trails have since been reconfigured and reopened.

In 1937, the Golden Gate Bridge was completed, and park attendance tripled, reaching over 180,000.

President Franklin Delano Roosevelt died on April 12, 1945, shortly before he was to have opened the United Nations Conference on International Organization, for which delegates from 50 countries met in San Francisco to draft and sign the United Nations Charter. On May 19, the delegates held a commemorative ceremony in tribute to his memory in Muir Woods' Cathedral Grove, where a dedication plaque was placed in his honor.

By 1962, more than one billion visitors had visited the park. Muir Woods is one of the major tourist attractions of the San Francisco Bay Area, with 776,000 visitors in 2005.

On January 9, 2008, the monument was listed on the National Register of Historic Places.

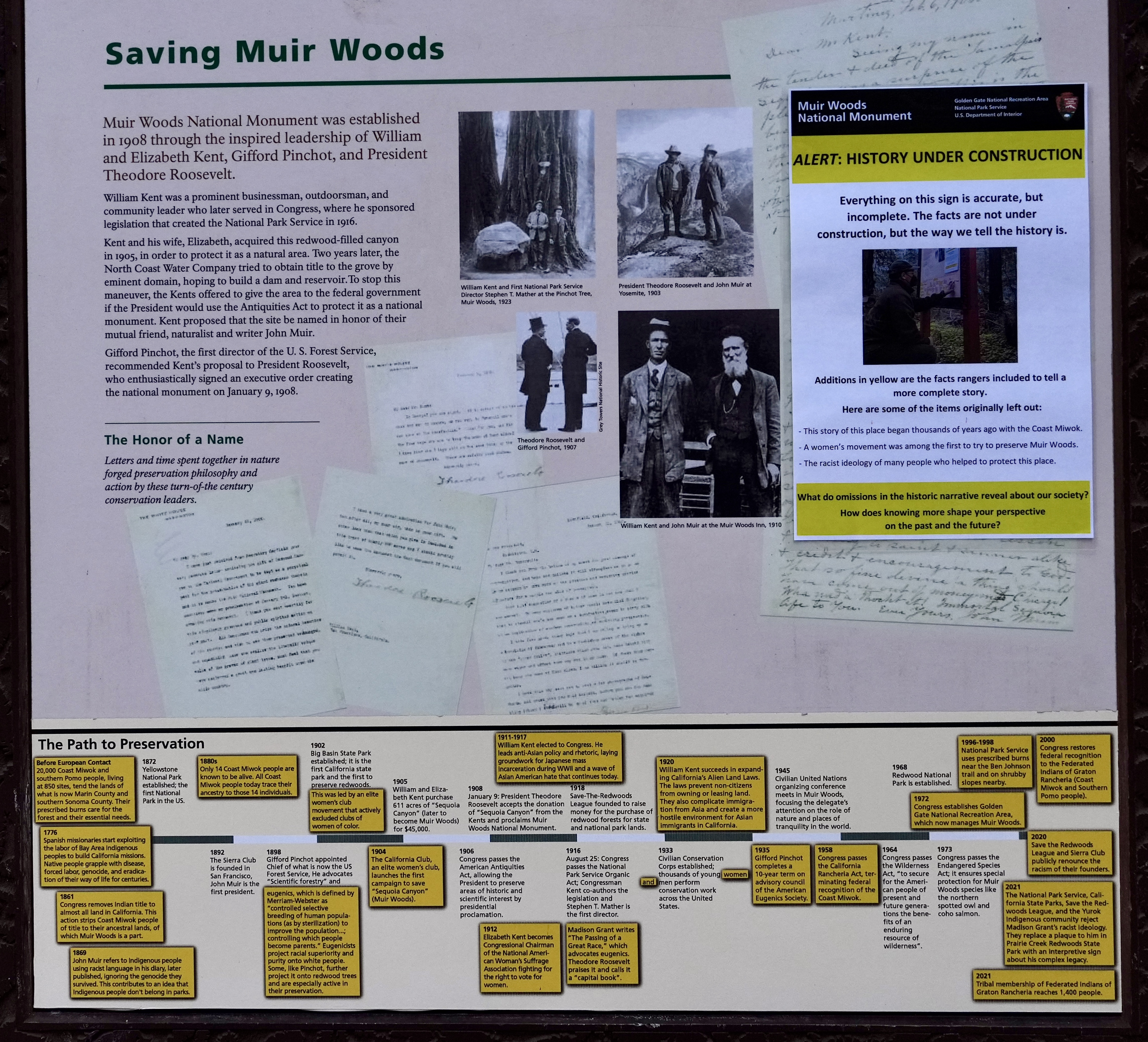
Muir Woods history sign, June 24, 2023, removed by the Trump administration in July 2025

In 2023, the U.S. National Park Service undertook a "History Under Construction" initiative, which included re-visiting the history of Muir Woods National Monument's founders and supporters to include the contributions of indigenous peoples and women. This resulted in new signage, for example, that acknowledged that the first movement to save the Sequoia Canyon was the Forestry chapter of the California Club, a women's club in the first decade of the twentieth century. Elizabeth Villano, now a former park ranger, helped create the new version of the sign.

In July 2025, the National Park Service removed this revised history on all Muir Woods National Monument signage that aimed to tell a more complete history of the site, that the Trump administration has referred to as “improper ideology” under a directive targeting diversity, equity, and inclusion (DEI)-related initiatives that allegedly undermined national unity, from Interior Secretary Doug Burgum issued earlier that year.

=== Ben Johnson's cabin ===
In the 1890s, Ben Johnson worked as a gamekeeper for the Sportsman's Club in Redwood Canyon, before it became Muir Woods National Monument, living in his own cabin near the confluence of the Redwood and Fern Creeks. Later, Ben Johnson was a caretaker of William Kent's land. Ben Johnson's cabin was demolished in 1928.

=== Muir Woods Inn ===
The first Muir Woods Inn, built not after 1900, was located at what is now called Camp Alice Eastwood, and burned down circa 1907.

The second Muir Woods Inn was built in 1913, approximately ½ mile downhill, from the first, hosting John Muir, William Kent, and John H. Cutter, the first president of the Tamalpais Conservation Club and a president of the Sierra Club.

== Biology ==
=== Flora ===
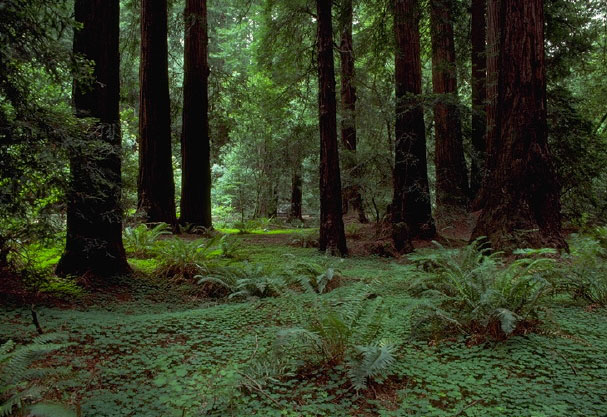
Undergrowth of a redwood canopy demonstrates the deep shadow under the trees. Note the clearing in the background showing other trees growing in the light.

The main attraction of Muir Woods is the coast redwood (Sequoia sempervirens) trees. They are known for their height and are related to the giant sequoia of the Sierra Nevada. While redwoods can grow to nearly 380 feet (115 m), the tallest tree in the Muir Woods is 258 feet (79 m). The trees come from a seed no bigger than a tomato seed. Most of the redwoods in the monument are between 500 and 800 years old. The oldest is at least 1,200 years old.

Other tree species grow in the understory of the redwood groves. Three of the most common are the California bay laurel, the bigleaf maple and the tanoak. Each of these species has developed a unique adaptation to the low level of dappled sunlight that reaches them through the redwoods overhead. The California bay laurel has a strong root system that allows the tree to lean towards openings in the canopy. The bigleaf maple, true to its name, has developed the largest leaf of any maple species. These large leaves allow it to capture more of the forest's dim light. The tanoak has a unique internal leaf structure that enables it to make effective use of the light that filters through the canopy.

=== Fish ===
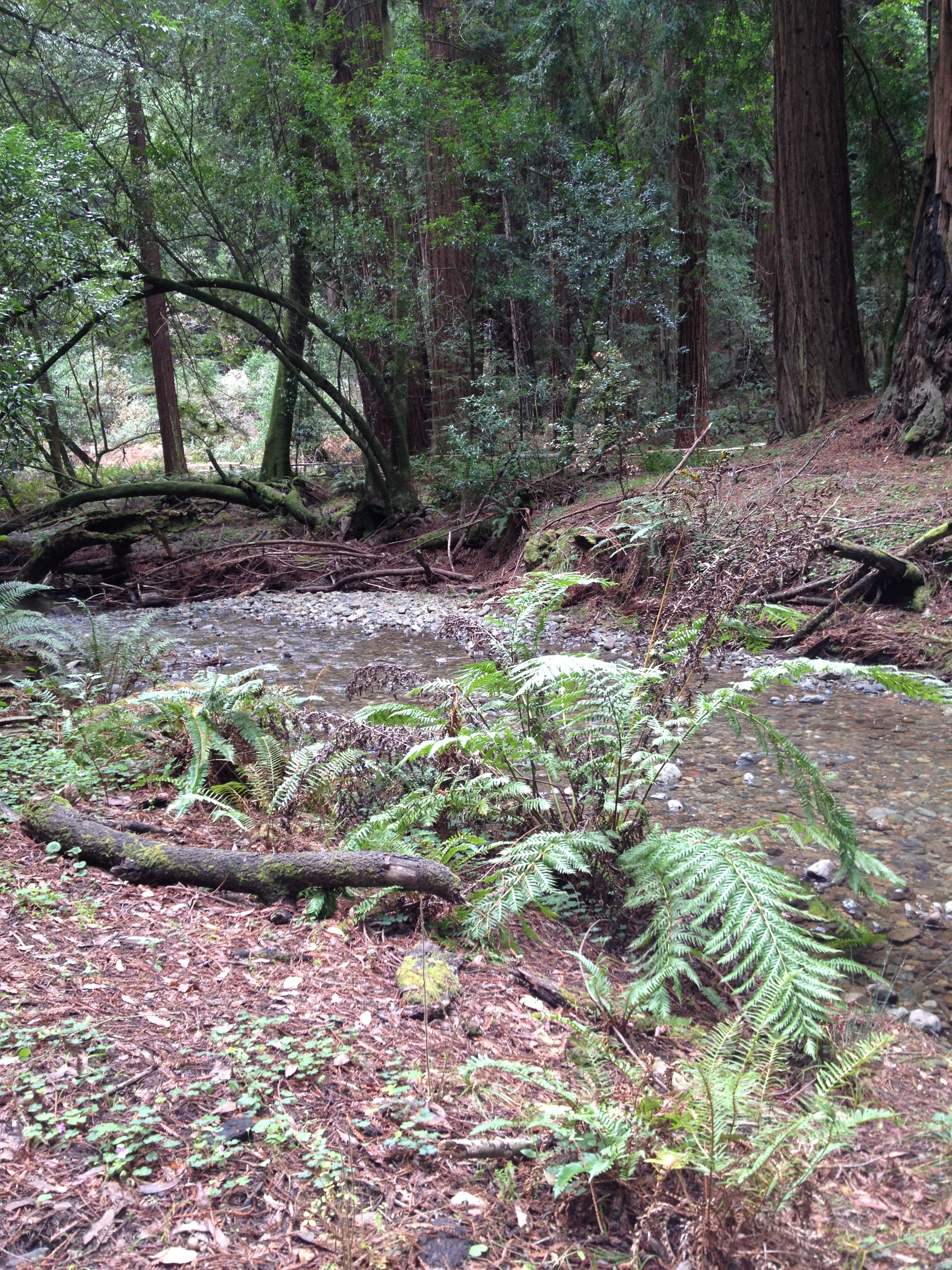
Redwood Creek

Redwood Creek provides a critical spawning and rearing habitat for coho or silver salmon (Oncorhynchus kisutch) and steelhead (Oncorhynchus mykiss). Steelhead are listed as threatened species (2011) in the Central California Coast distinct population segment. Coho salmon are listed as endangered in their evolutionary significant unit (2011). The creek is near the southernmost limit of coho habitat and the fish have never been stocked, so they have a distinctive DNA. The Redwood Creek salmon are Central Coast coho salmon which have been listed as federally threatened species since October 2006 and as federally endangered species in June 2005. Coho migrate from the ocean back to freshwater for a single chance at reproduction, generally after two years in the ocean. The spawning migrations begin after heavy late fall or winter rains breach the sandbar at Muir Beach allowing the fish to move upstream (usually in December and January). No salmon were seen in the 2007–2008 winter run, nor the 2008–2009 winter run. Evidence points to exhaustion of smolt oversummering in the creek due to a loss of large woody debris and deep pools where young salmon can rest. Starting in 2009, the National Park Service began restoring Muir Beach to create a functional, self-sustaining ecosystem and improve visitor access. The intervention was almost too late, since the coho only has a three-year life span. But, as of January 2010, and for the first time in three years, an estimated 45 coho swam up Redwood Creek to spawn, creating 23 redds or clusters of eggs. In 2011, 11 live adult coho and 1 coho carcass was observed, along with three redds, a modest increase over the 2007–2008 spawning season. Statewide the coho population is 1% of its levels in the 1940s and the fish have vanished from 90% of the streams they formerly visited. The Watershed Alliance of Marin reported that no salmon returned to spawn in 2014, prompting concerns that the fish may now be extirpated from the creek.

=== Birds ===
Muir Woods is home to over 50 species of birds. This relatively low number is due to the lack of insects. The tannin in the trees repels the insects and the volume of flowers and fruits produced by plants below the canopy is limited by the shade of the redwoods.

It is occasionally possible to see northern spotted owls or pileated woodpeckers in the forest. While decreasing in numbers elsewhere, the spotted owls appear to be thriving in the monument and other evergreen forests in the area. A National Park Service monitoring project of the owls is ongoing within the monument. The project has found that adult owls are finding mates, raising young to adulthood and the young are having new broods of their own.

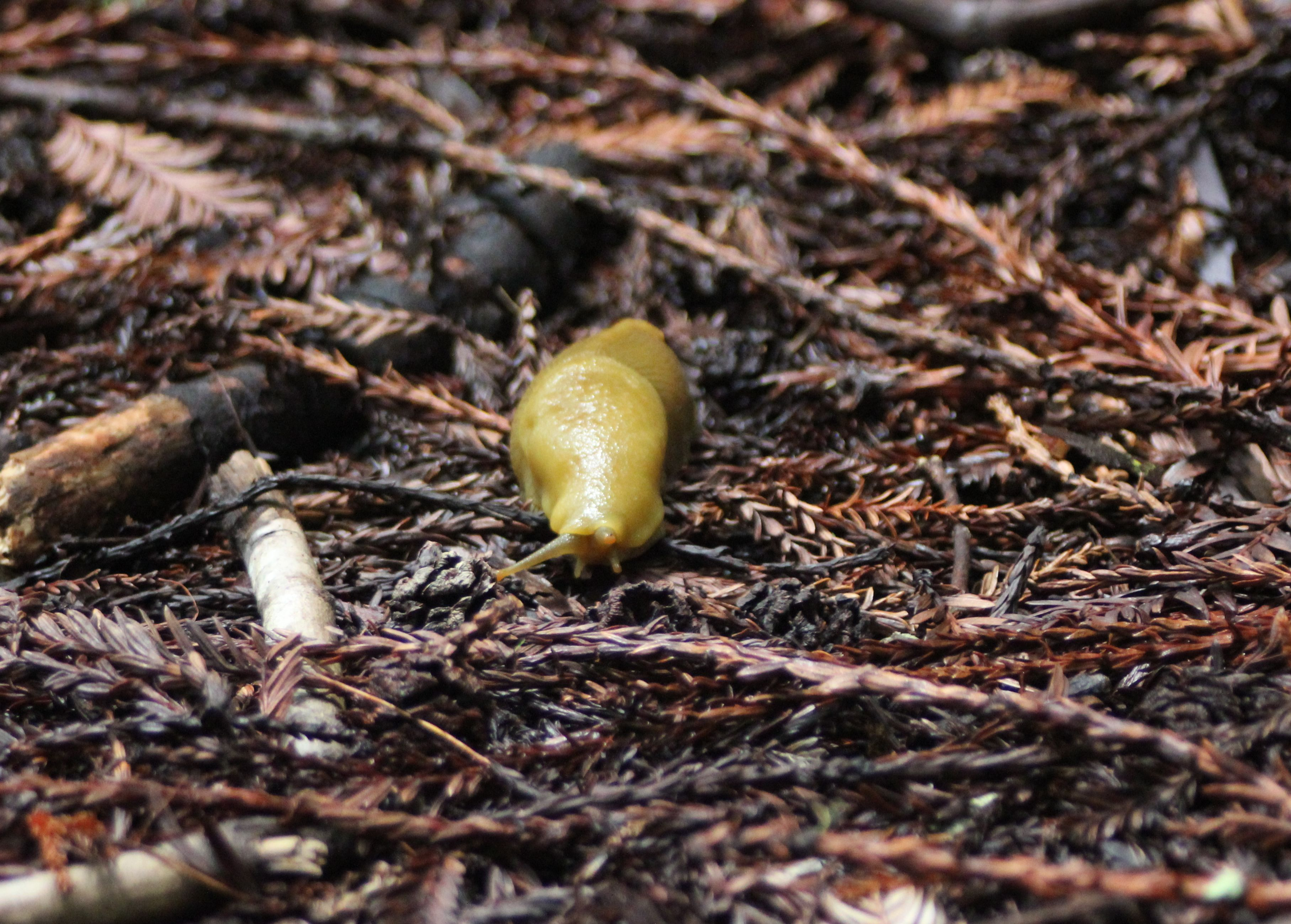
Banana slugs are common in Muir Woods

=== Mammals ===
The monument is home to a variety of mammals ranging in size from the small, four-inch long American shrew mole to the much larger black-tailed subspecies of mule deer, Odocoileus hemionus columbianus. The majority of the monument's mammals are either nocturnal or are burrowing animals that live underground or in the forest floor's dense plant litter. Most commonly seen are Sonoma chipmunks and western gray squirrels.

Bears historically roamed the area but were largely exterminated by habitat destruction. In 2003 a male black bear was spotted wandering in various areas of Marin County, including Muir Woods.

There are 11 species of bats that call the monument home, often using hollows burned into the redwoods by past fires as a maternity colony.

In November 2010 sea otters (Enhydra lutris) have been spotted swimming in the new stream channel constructed in the lagoon area of Redwood Creek.

== Recreation ==
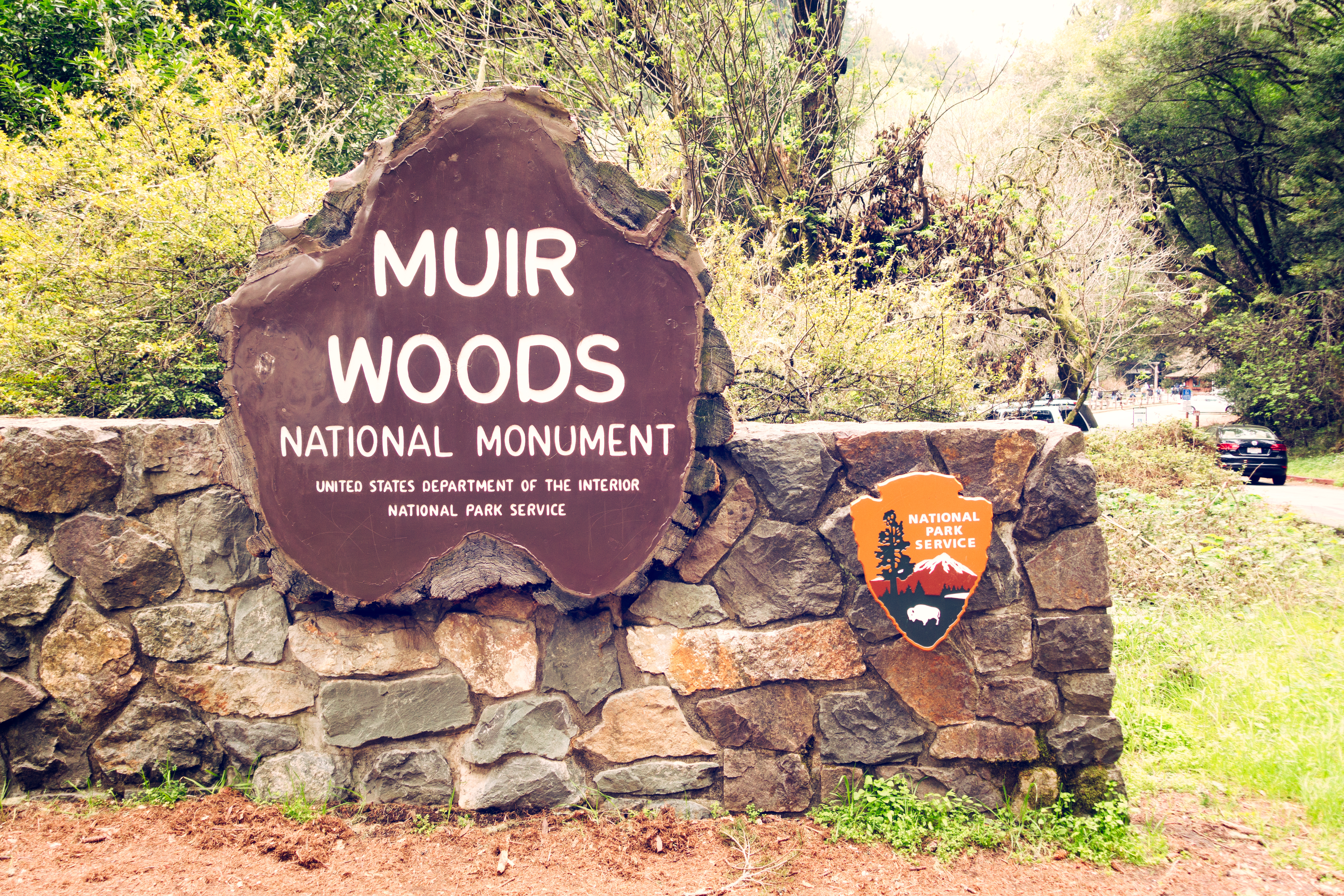
Vehicle entrance sign to Muir Woods main parking area, 2015

Muir Woods, part of the Golden Gate National Recreation Area, is a park which caters to pedestrians, as parking of vehicles is only allowed at the very entrance. Hiking trails vary in the level of difficulty and distance. Picnicking, camping and pets are not permitted.

As of 2015, the park sees up to 6000 visitors per day during peak times (April to October, Thanksgiving weekend, and Christmas through New Years), more than 80% of which arrive by car, and most of the rest with a tour bus or shuttle bus. Parking is extremely limited and lots often fill early in the day. The county and the National Park Service introduced a reservation system in early 2018 which restricts the number of vehicles allowed to enter and park in Muir Woods every day. Residents of neighboring Mill Valley had protested against earlier plans to set up an additional parking lot, and together with a group named "Mount Tam Task Force" sued to prevent the building of a shuttle bus station.

=== Facilities ===
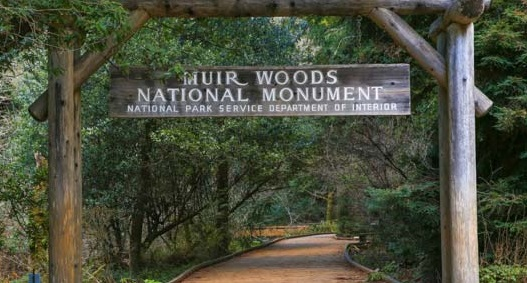
Entrance To Muir Woods National Monument

==== Parking and shuttle ====
Reservations are required for all vehicles and shuttle riders since 2018. Marin Transit operates a shuttle on all weekends and holidays and during select peak weekdays, providing service to Muir Woods from Sausalito, Marin City, or Mill Valley (Route 66); the National Park Service recommends that visitors use the shuttle when it is operating to avoid difficulties in finding parking.

The NPS requires reservations made in advance for all vehicles and shuttle riders; a parking reservation is $8.50 per vehicle while a spot on the shuttle is $3.25 per person. Furthermore, an entrance fee of $15.00 per person is charged in order to gain entry to Muir Woods. The shuttle service and park are open every day of the year including holidays. The park is open from 8:00 am and closes at sunset.

==== Lodging and camping ====
There are no camping or lodging facilities in Muir Woods. The monument is a day-use area only. There are camping facilities in the adjacent Mount Tamalpais State Park.

==== Comfort facilities ====
- Restrooms located in entrance plaza and cafe
- Muir Woods Trading Company cafe and gift shop – offers deli food items and souvenirs. The cafe also has a permanent display of historic photographs.
- The main trail (paved and boardwalk) through Muir Woods is a 2 miles (3.2 km) loop. A .5 miles (0.80 km) loop from the Visitor Center, through Founders Grove, to Bridge 2 and back is ADA accessible.

==== Interpretive facilities and services ====
- The Visitor Center, located in the entrance plaza, features permanent and changing exhibits on redwood ecology and conservation, as well as a store selling books and gift items.

=== Activities ===
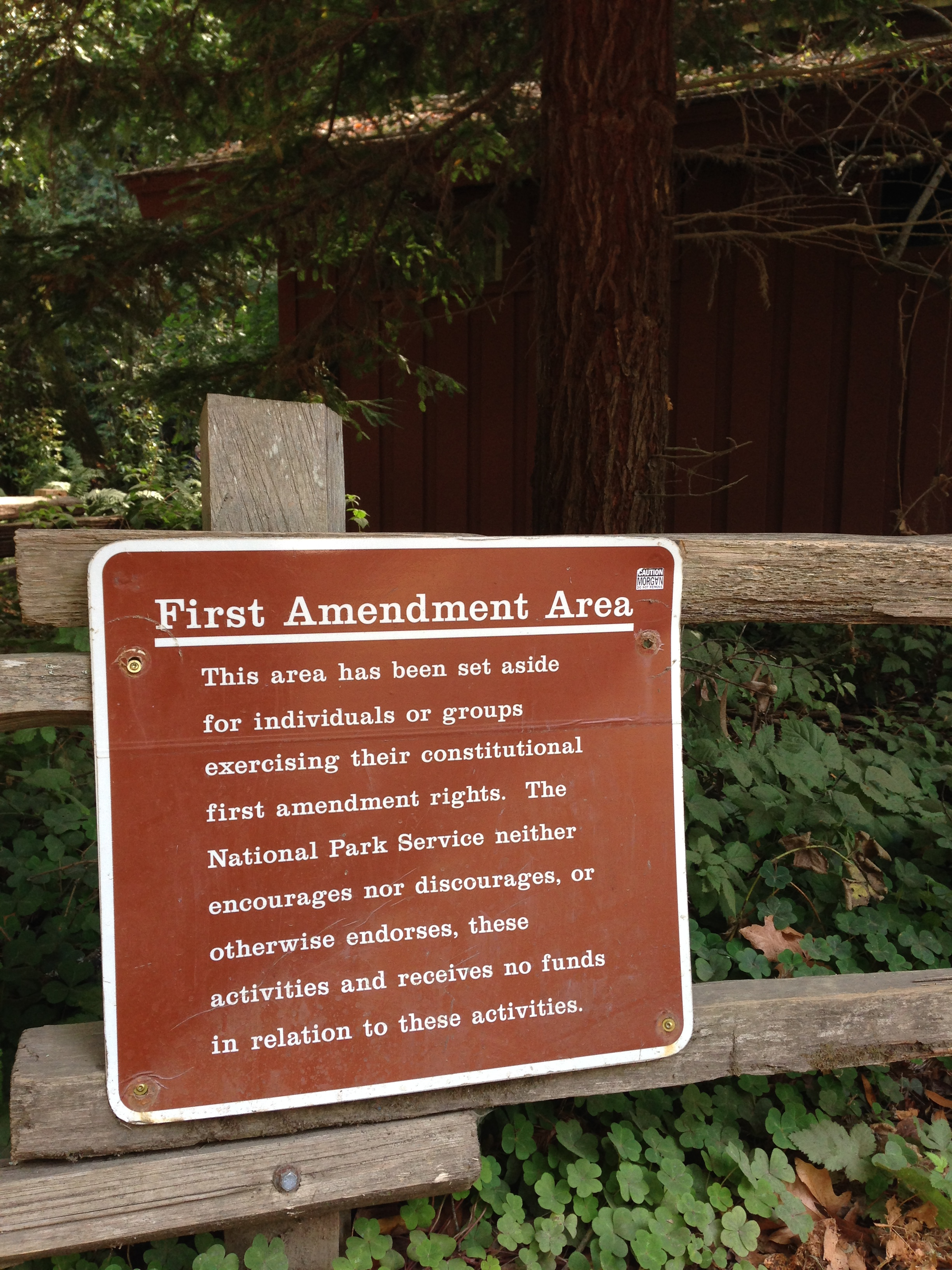
First Amendment Area sign, Muir Woods

==== Hiking and biking ====
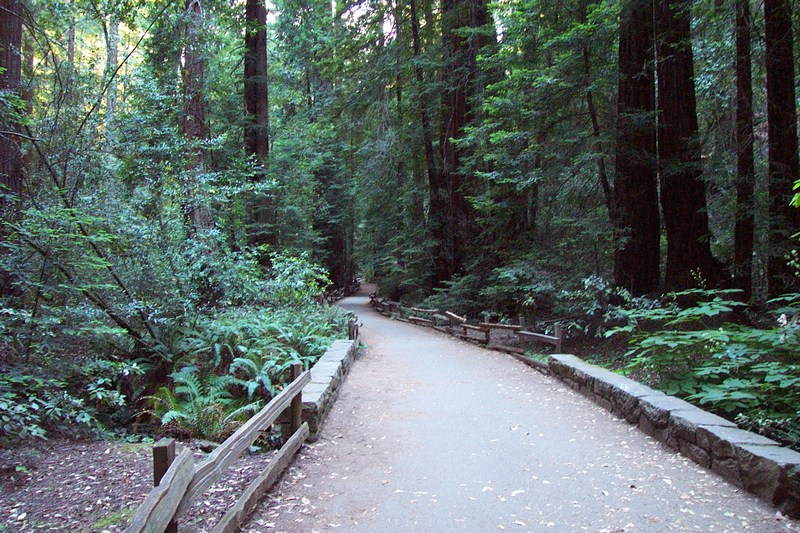
A paved trail in Muir Woods

The paved/boardwalk main trail begins at the entrance plaza and travels into the old-growth redwood forest alongside Redwood Creek. Other unpaved walking trails extend from the main trail to connect with Mt. Tamalpais State Park trails outside of the monument boundaries.

Bicycles are only allowed on designated fire roads.

==== Athletic events ====
The annual Dipsea Race, a footrace which goes between Mill Valley and Stinson Beach, passes through Muir Woods on the second Sunday in June. The Double Dipsea, later in June and the Quad Dipsea, in November, follow the same course.

==== Ranger-led activities ====
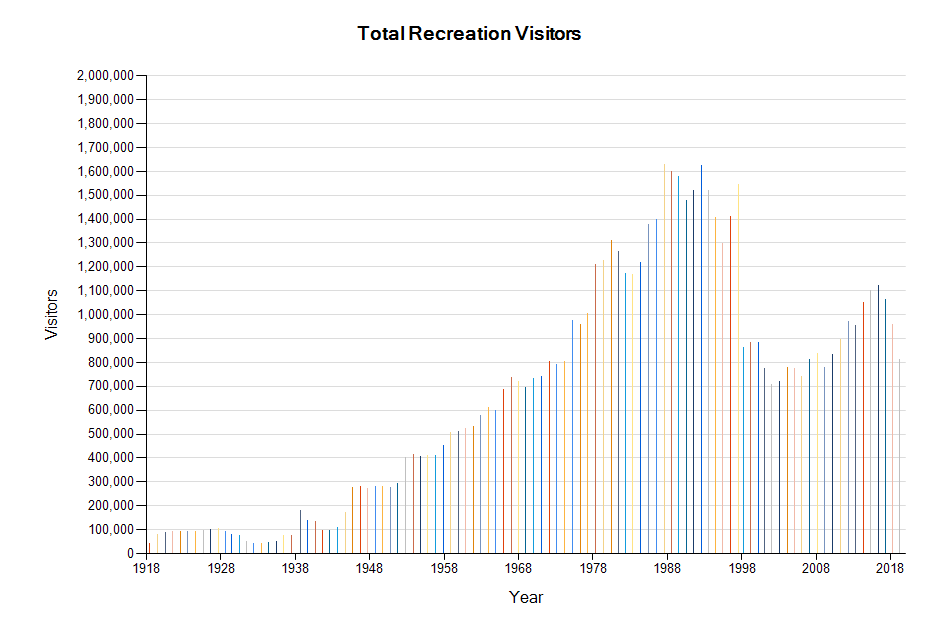
Annual Recreational Visitors

Rangers and volunteers present 15-minute interpretive talks and guided one-hour tours when staffing permits. Program topics include redwood ecology and conservation, the impact of climate change, and the history of Muir Woods. Longer hikes or other special programs are offered several times per month, and require a reservation.

==== Weddings and Special Events ====
Weddings, commercial filming, and special events are allowed in the monument only with a proper permit.

== Impact of tourism ==
=== Positive ===
In 2018, more than 17.5 million visitors visited Golden Gate National Recreation Area, Muir Woods National Monument, and Fort Point National Historic Site, and spent $1.2 billion in communities near the parks. The protections given to these areas by the federal government helped to establish them as natural tourist destinations creating an attraction that brought positive externalities in the form of increased business to the surrounding communities. According to the National Park Service, the spending and cash flow brought to the area through these visitors created 12,658 new local jobs and had a net benefit of $1.6 billion in additional revenue.

A peer-reviewed visitor spending analysis was conducted by economists Catherine Thomas and Egan Cornachione of the U.S. Geological Survey and Lynne Koontz of the National Park Service. The report shows $20.2 billion of direct spending by more than 318 million park visitors in communities within 60 miles of a national park. This spending supported 329,000 jobs nationally; 268,000 of those jobs are found in these gateway communities. The cumulative benefit to the U.S. economy was $40.1 billion.

=== Negative ===
The popularity of Muir Woods as a tourist destination has created a great deal of congestion and delay on the two lane California State Highway 1. As a result, many civilians and residents living near Muir Woods and affected by the increased traffic on the pathway to the national monument have voiced concern with the National Park Service. In response, policy was designed that would create a parking reservation system, detailed road shoulder parking limits and enhanced parking enforcement in order to combat the negative externalities caused by Muir Woods.

However, according to the Mount Tam Task Force, created to address the traffic concerns created by Muir Woods, the policy aimed towards fixing the issue has proved ineffective. The introduction of a website where all parking and shuttle reservations can be made, has helped to decongest the traffic to an extent. Despite the number of attending visitors trending downward at Muir Woods, parking and congestion remain a problem for tourists and locals alike.

== Surrounding ecosystems ==
According to the National Parks Conservation Association, in an attempt to protect the wildlife and environment of Muir Woods, which is given certain protections due to the Antiquities Act, it is necessary to take care of the ecosystems of surrounding areas outside of park boundaries that have impacts on the wildlife and ecosystems within the park. As a result, the park is involved in restoration and conservation efforts in Redwood Creek at the Banducci Flower Farm site, which is managed by the Golden Gate National Recreation Area, and at Big Lagoon, which is outside the monument at Muir Beach, to improve ecosystem health and salmonid habitat. These efforts typically require a mixture of effort from the National Park Service, federal, state, and local governments; and even private landowners. The restoration efforts in surrounding areas outside of Muir Woods have helped to protect and restore the habitats of wildlife and fish such as coho salmon and the northern spotted owl.

The National Park Service and the Golden Gate National Parks Conservancy have worked together to restore the last 1/2 mile of the Redwood Creek before it enters the Pacific Ocean. Before restoration efforts, the Redwood Creek mouth functioned poorly in conveying water and sediment from a nine square mile watershed to the ocean. The National Park Service claims that for over 100 years agriculture, logging, and road-building increased the erosion and degradation of the creek. As a result, local species of coho salmon and steelhead trout were threatened. Moreover, due to the poor state of Redwood Creek, even moderate and slight storms would cause flooding leaving residents flooded and local roads untraversable. While technically within the protected lands of Muir Woods, the poor state of Redwood Creek was having negative effects on wildlife and the ability to travel to Muir Woods. The efforts to restore Redwood Creek illustrate a way in which the government protection of Muir Woods leads to positive benefits for the surrounding area.

== Music ==
American keyboardist and composer George Duke composed Muir Woods Suite in 1993. The Suite, a major orchestral piece, was premiered and recorded live at the Montreux Jazz Festival. Japanese composer Toru Takemitsu composed a three movement solo classical guitar piece called "In the Woods" in 1995. The third movement of the piece is called Muir Woods and it was inspired in this forest.

== In fiction ==
Characters played by James Stewart and Kim Novak visit the Muir Woods National Monument in Alfred Hitchcock's 1958 film Vertigo; however, the scene was actually shot in Big Basin Redwoods State Park.

The monument was a setting in Rise of the Planet of the Apes (2011), Dawn of the Planet of the Apes (2014) and the first act of War for the Planet of the Apes (2017), though all three films were in fact filmed in British Columbia, and none of the movie was filmed in the park, but the movie crew took pictures of Muir Woods' redwood trees and replicated them.

Jack Kerouac discusses hiking though Muir Woods in his 1958 novel The Dharma Bums. It appears in the Big Hero 6: The Series, set in an alternate history that San Francisco was under much Japanese influence after the 1906 earthquake, as "Muirahara Woods" in the eponymous episode.

== See also ==
- List of national monuments of the United States
