= Muir Beach, California =

Muir Beach
- Unincorporated Community; Census Designated Place
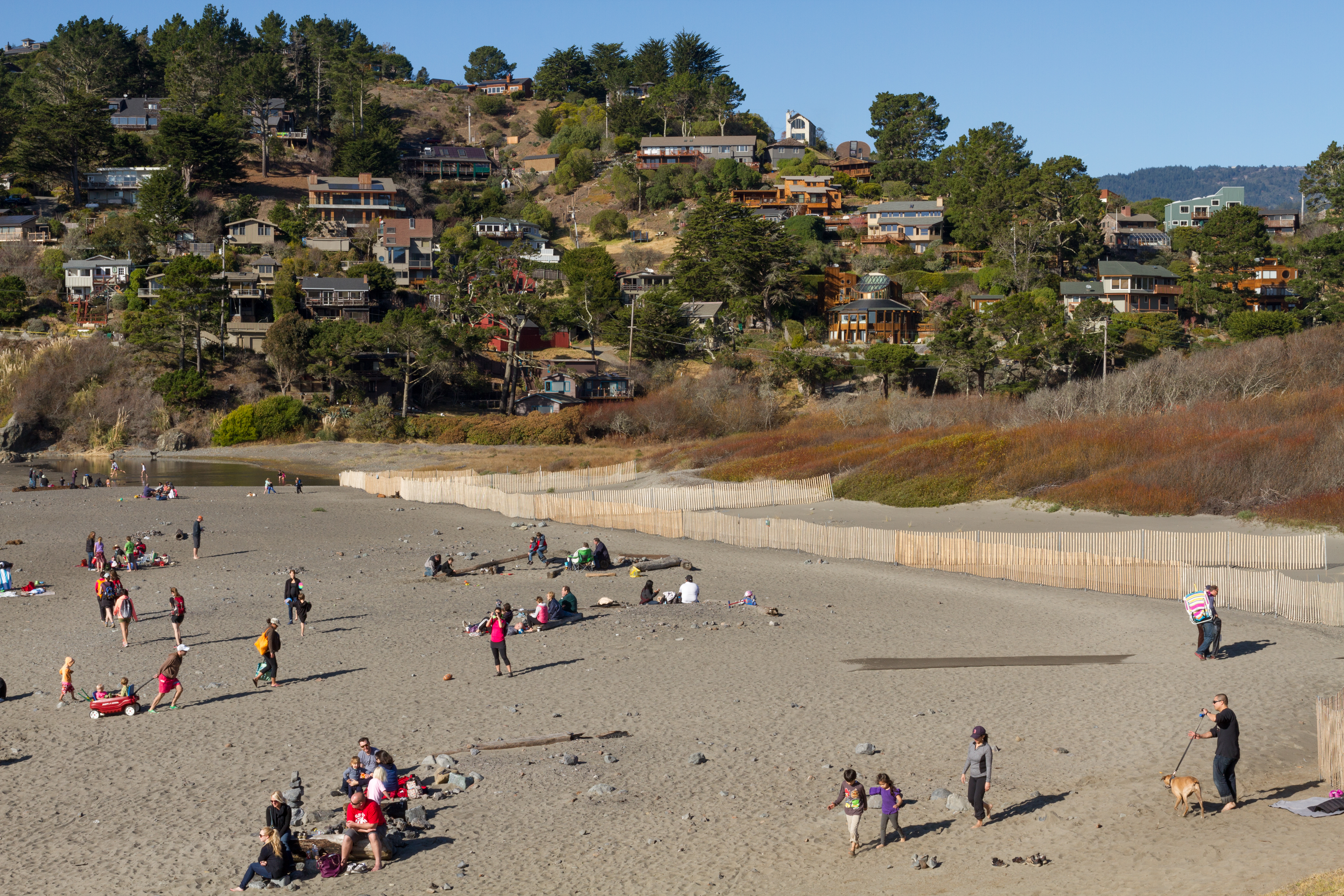
- Muir Beach as seen from the beach in December 2013

- Location in Marin County and the state of California

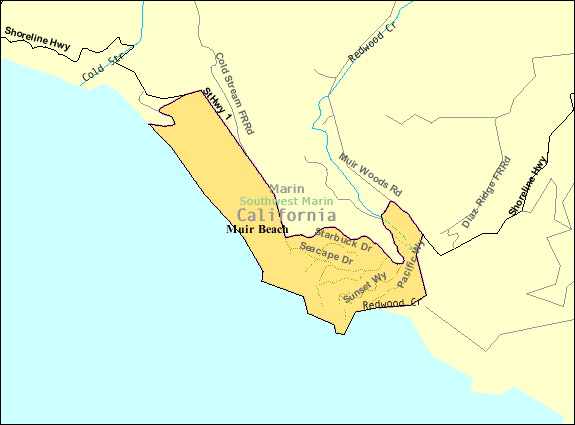
- Muir Beach CDP, California
- Coordinates: 37°51′44″N 122°34′53″W
- Country: United States
- State: California
- County: Marin
- Established: 1958

Government
  - Type: Community Services District
  - Board members: See Directors
  - Supervisor: District 4 Dennis Rodoni
  - State senator: Mike McGuire (D)
  - Assemblymember: Damon Connolly (D)
  - U. S. rep.: Jared Huffman (D)

Area
  - Total: 0.493 sq mi (1.28 km^{2})
  - Land: 0.493 sq mi (1.28 km^{2})
  - Water: 0 sq mi (0 km^{2}) 0%
- Elevation: 312 ft (95 m)

Population (2020)
  - Total: 304
  - Density: 617/sq mi (238/km^{2})
- Time zone: UTC-8 (Pacific)
  - Summer (DST): UTC-7 (PDT)
- ZIP code: 94965
- Area codes: 415/628
- FIPS code: 06-49950
- GNIS feature IDs: 1853403, 2408888
- Website: www.muirbeachcsd.com

Muir Beach is a census designated place (CDP), unincorporated community, and beach on the Pacific Ocean. The community is located 16.5 miles (26.6 km) northwest of San Francisco in western Marin County, California, United States. Unlike many other entities in the area, it is not named directly in honor of conservationist John Muir; instead, it was named after Muir Woods National Monument to capitalize on the latter's popularity. The population was 304 at the 2020 census. The community itself flanks the northwest side of the beach.

Located about 2 miles (3 km) from the entrance to Muir Woods, the beach is about 1,000 feet (300 m) long and 200 feet (61 m) wide, with coarse sand and several large boulders. Redwood Creek empties into the beach. There is a parking lot at the beach, which is accessible via a footbridge.

The subdivision of homes was formerly called Bello Beach, and the beach itself was formerly called Big Lagoon after a freshwater lagoon that was located where the parking lot is now. Damage from 20th century dairy farms interfered with the flow of the creek and the lagoon.

== Geography ==
According to the United States Census Bureau, the CDP has a total area of 0.5 square miles (1.3 km^{2}), all land. California State Route 1 leads northeast 6 miles (10 km) to U.S. Route 101 near Sausalito and northwest 22 miles (35 km) to Point Reyes Station.

The beach is one of the cleanest in the state.

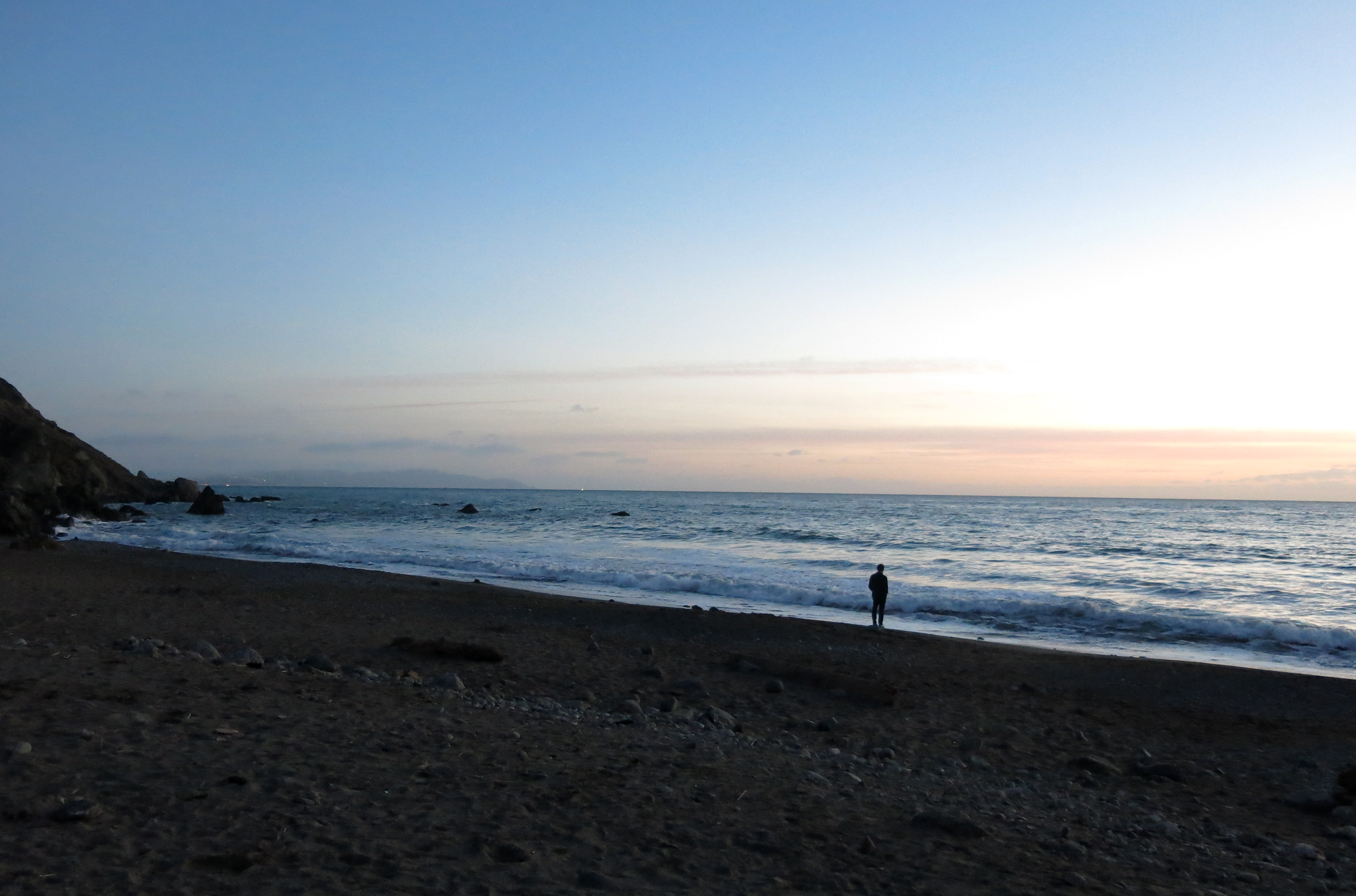
Muir Beach after sunset

== Demographics ==
Historical population
Census	Pop.	Note	%±
2000	295		—
2010	310		5.1%
2020	304		−1.9%
U.S. Decennial Census; 1860–1870 1880-1890; 1900 1910 1920; 1930 1940 1950; 1960 1970 1980; 1990 2000 2010; 2020

Muir Beach first appeared as a census designated place in the 2000 U.S. census.

=== Racial and ethnic composition ===
Muir Beach CDP, California – Racial and ethnic composition Note: the US Census treats Hispanic/Latino as an ethnic category. This table excludes Latinos from the racial categories and assigns them to a separate category. Hispanics/Latinos may be of any race.
Race / Ethnicity (NH = Non-Hispanic)	Pop 2000	Pop 2010	Pop 2020	% 2000	% 2010	% 2020
White alone (NH)	269	278	270	91.19%	89.68%	88.82%
Black or African American alone (NH)	1	5	4	0.34%	1.61%	1.32%
Native American or Alaska Native alone (NH)	0	0	1	0.00%	0.00%	0.33%
Asian alone (NH)	8	12	10	2.71%	3.87%	3.29%
Native Hawaiian or Pacific Islander alone (NH)	0	0	0	0.00%	0.00%	0.00%
Other race alone (NH)	5	0	1	1.69%	0.00%	0.33%
Mixed race or Multiracial (NH)	6	8	8	2.03%	2.58%	2.63%
Hispanic or Latino (any race)	6	7	10	2.03%	2.26%	3.29%
Total	295	310	304	100.00%	100.00%	100.00%

=== 2020 ===
The 2020 United States census reported that Muir Beach had a population of 304. The population density was 616.6 inhabitants per square mile (238.1/km^{2}). The racial makeup of Muir Beach was 273 (89.8%) White, 5 (1.6%) African American, 1 (0.3%) Native American, 10 (3.3%) Asian, 0 (0.0%) Pacific Islander, 3 (1.0%) from other races, and 12 (3.9%) from two or more races. Hispanic or Latino of any race were 10 persons (3.3%).

The census reported that 299 people (98.4% of the population) lived in households, 5 (1.6%) lived in non-institutionalized group quarters, and no one was institutionalized.

There were 135 households, out of which 32 (23.7%) had children under the age of 18 living in them, 65 (48.1%) were married-couple households, 13 (9.6%) were cohabiting couple households, 25 (18.5%) had a female householder with no partner present, and 32 (23.7%) had a male householder with no partner present. 40 households (29.6%) were one person, and 19 (14.1%) were one person aged 65 or older. The average household size was 2.21. There were 81 families (60.0% of all households).

The age distribution was 45 people (14.8%) under the age of 18, 23 people (7.6%) aged 18 to 24, 54 people (17.8%) aged 25 to 44, 81 people (26.6%) aged 45 to 64, and 101 people (33.2%) who were 65 years of age or older. The median age was 53.7 years. For every 100 females, there were 108.2 males.

There were 160 housing units at an average density of 324.5 units per square mile (125.3 units/km^{2}), of which 135 (84.4%) were occupied. Of these, 101 (74.8%) were owner-occupied, and 34 (25.2%) were occupied by renters.

=== 2010 ===
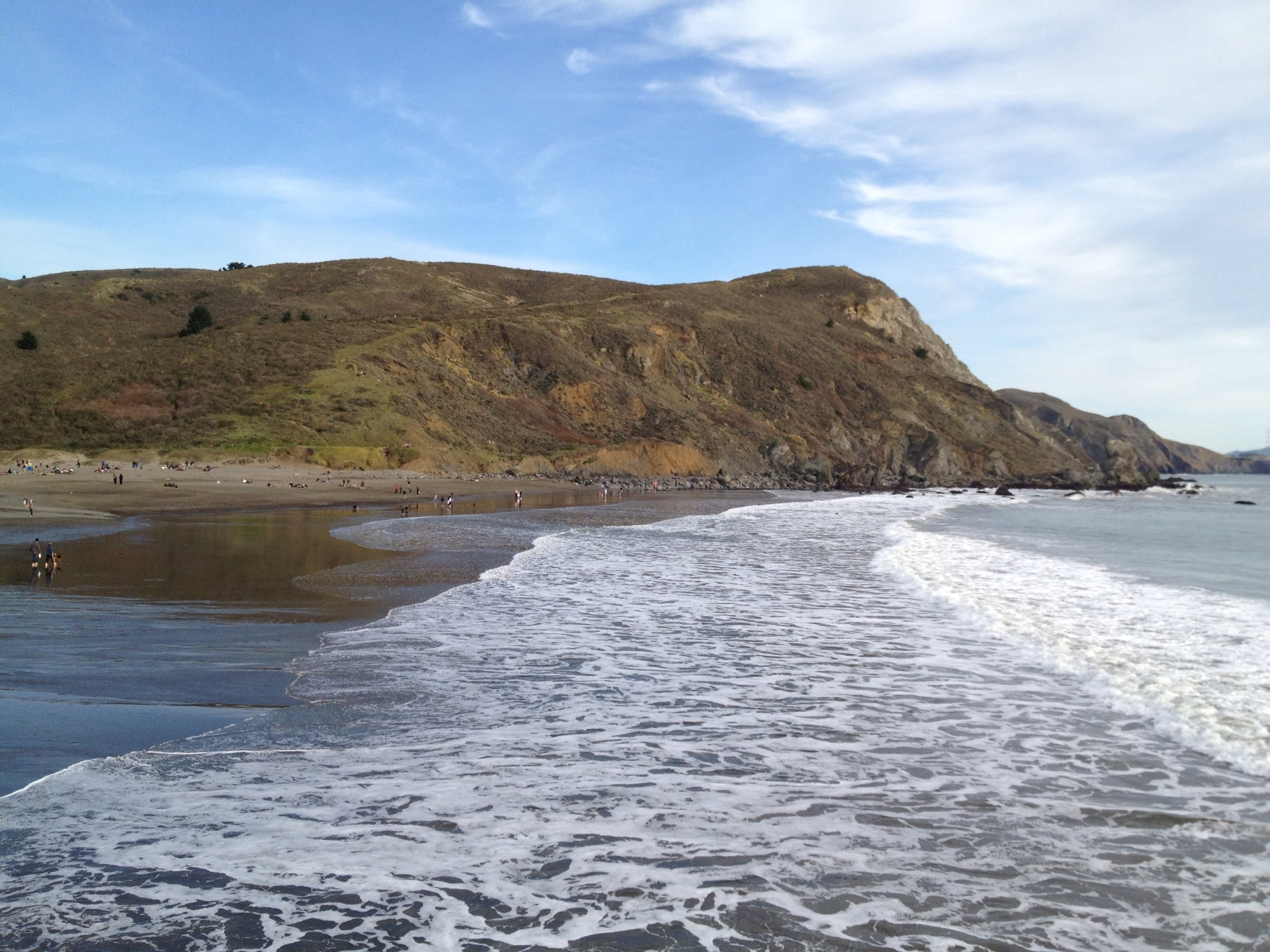
Waves on Muir Beach

At the 2010 census Muir Beach had a population of 310. The population density was 629.0 inhabitants per square mile (242.9/km^{2}). The racial makeup of Muir Beach was 283 (91.3%) White, 5 (1.6%) African American, 1 (0.3%) Native American, 12 (3.9%) Asian, 1 (0.3%) from other races, and 8 (2.6%) from two or more races. Hispanic or Latino of any race were 7 people (2.3%).

The census reported that 95.8% of the population lived in households and 4.2% lived in non-institutionalized group quarters.

There were 141 households, 27 (19.1%) had children under the age of 18 living in them, 79 (56.0%) were opposite-sex married couples living together, 4 (2.8%) had a female householder with no husband present, 3 (2.1%) had a male householder with no wife present. There were 11 (7.8%) unmarried opposite-sex partnerships, and 1 (0.7%) same-sex married couples or partnerships. 39 households (27.7%) were one person and 11 (7.8%) had someone living alone who was 65 or older. The average household size was 2.11. There were 86 families (61.0% of households); the average family size was 2.47.

The age distribution was 38 people (12.3%) under the age of 18, 10 people (3.2%) aged 18 to 24, 56 people (18.1%) aged 25 to 44, 138 people (44.5%) aged 45 to 64, and 68 people (21.9%) who were 65 or older. The median age was 52.6 years. For every 100 females, there were 102.6 males. For every 100 females aged 18 and over, there were 106.1 males.

There were 162 housing units at an average density of 328.7 per square mile (126.9/km^{2}), of which 73.8% were owner-occupied and 26.2% were occupied by renters. The homeowner vacancy rate was 1.0%; the rental vacancy rate was 2.6%. 75.2% of the population lived in owner-occupied housing units and 20.6% lived in rental housing units.

=== 2000 ===
At the 2000 census, the median household income was $125,402 and the median family income was $152,174. The per capita income for the CDP was $66,476. None of the families and 10.5% of the population were living below the poverty line.

== Education ==
Much of Muir Beach is in the Mill Valley School District, while a portion is in the Bolinas-Stinson Union Elementary School District. All of Muir Beach is in the Tamalpais Union High School District, and the Marin Community College District.

Students attend public schools in or near Mill Valley at Tamalpais Valley Elementary School (kindergarten - grade 5), Mill Valley Middle School (grades 6 - 8), and Tamalpais High School (grades 9 - 12).

== Climate ==
According to the Köppen Climate Classification system, Muir Beach has a warm-summer Mediterranean climate, abbreviated "Csb" on climate maps. Like much of the California coast, summer afternoons are often cool and windy (and sometimes foggy) as winds blow in off the ocean. It receives a good amount of rain with 1,034.70 mm (40.736 in) of rain.

Climate data for Stinson Beach (Bolinas), California
Month	Jan	Feb	Mar	Apr	May	Jun	Jul	Aug	Sep	Oct	Nov	Dec	Year
Mean daily maximum °F (°C)	55.3 (12.9)	59.6 (15.3)	63.0 (17.2)	66.0 (18.9)	69.5 (20.8)	73.8 (23.2)	76.3 (24.6)	76.7 (24.8)	76.7 (24.8)	72.0 (22.2)	62.6 (17.0)	55.4 (13.0)	67.2 (19.6)
Mean daily minimum °F (°C)	42.9 (6.1)	44.8 (7.1)	46.1 (7.8)	47.5 (8.6)	50.0 (10.0)	52.7 (11.5)	54.0 (12.2)	54.5 (12.5)	53.8 (12.1)	51.4 (10.8)	47.1 (8.4)	43.1 (6.2)	49.0 (9.4)
Average precipitation inches (mm)	6.2 (160)	6.2 (160)	4.6 (120)	2.0 (51)	1.1 (28)	0.3 (7.6)	0 (0)	0.1 (2.5)	0.3 (7.6)	1.7 (43)	4.4 (110)	6.5 (170)	33.4 (859.7)
Source: Bestplaces.net

== Local government ==
Muir Beach is unincorporated, receiving general government services from Marin County, including law enforcement, land-use planning, library, public health, and code enforcement. A special district, the Muir Beach Community Services District, provides local services, including fire protection, water, road maintenance, and recreation. The District has a board of directors, with five members elected to four-year terms. The District includes all of the Muir Beach CDP, plus Green Gulch Farm. (See map of MBCSD.)

== Notable history ==
On December 11, 1965, Muir Beach was the site of the Third Acid Test.
