= We Players =

We Players Theater Company
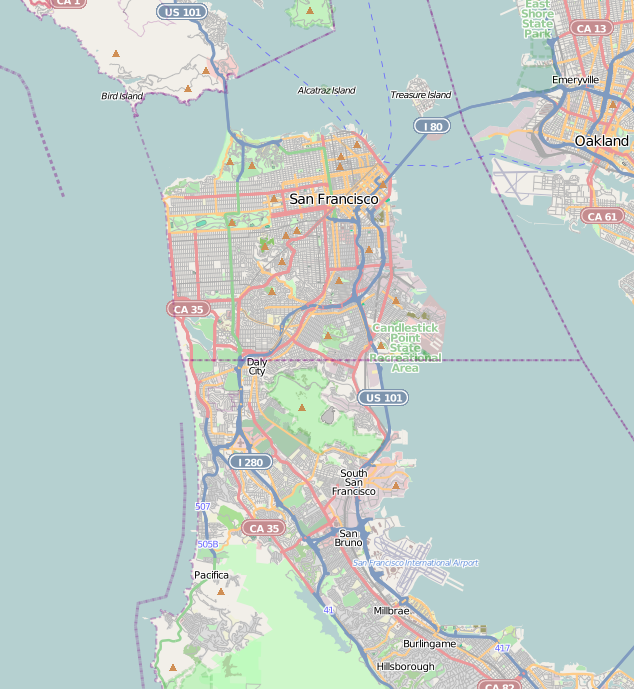
- Location within the San Francisco Bay Area
- Address: Pier 54; San Francisco, CA 94158
- Coordinates: 37.770447°N 122.385049°W
- Production: Hamlet, Macbeth

Construction
- Opened: 2009

Website
- www.weplayers.org

We Players is a site-integrated theater company based in the San Francisco Bay Area. The company was founded in 2000 by Ava Roy, its Artistic Director, while she was a student at Stanford University.

== Site-integration venue ==
We Players programs are interactive, taking place at typically outdoor locations rather than inside a theatre building. The intent is to use the physical environment to affect the audience's perception of the play and allow viewers to get involved in the production as it is performed in and around the audience.

== Partnership with National and State Park Services ==
In November 2008 Amy Brees, the National Park Service’s Alcatraz site supervisor, invited Ava Roy, We Players’ Artistic Director, to be the first artist-in-residence on the island. Since then, the theater company has co-operated with the National Park Service and California State Parks by bring their performances into these areas turning public park spaces into "impromptu playhouses". In 2012 the theatre company entered into a five-year cooperative agreement with San Francisco Maritime National Historical Park to perform in the park.

== Productions ==
- 2006 - The Tempest at the Albany Bulb
- 2008 - Macbeth at Fort Point
- 2009 - Iphigenia and Other Daughters on Alcatraz
- 2010 - Hamlet on Alcatraz
- 2011 - Cellhouse Dance and social justice symposium on Alcatraz
- 2011 - The Odyssey on Alma
- 2012 - Twelfth Night at Hyde Street Pier
- 2012 - The Odyssey on Angel Island State Park
- 2013 - Macbeth at Fort Point
- 2014 - Macbeth at Fort Point
- 2014 - King Fool at Battery Wallace in the Marin Headlands
- 2015 - Ondine at Sutro
- 2015 - HEROMONSTER at The Chapel at Fort Mason Center for Arts and Culture
- 2016 - The Capulet Ball (multiple locations including: private residence in San Anselmo, St. John's Episcopal Church in San Francisco, Impact Hub in Oakland, and Castello di Amorosa in St. Helena)
- 2016 - Romeo and Juliet at Rancho Petaluma Adobe State Historic Park
- 2016 - Romeo and Juliet at Villa Montalvo
- 2017 - BEOWULF at SF Maritime & Fort Mason
- 2017 - Midsummer of Love at Strawberry Hill in Stow Lake, Golden Gate Park
- 2017 - Midsummer of Love at Kennedy Grove, East Bay Regional Park
- 2017 - Mother Lear (multiple locations, public and private including the Montalvo Arts Center, McLaren Park, and the East Bay JCC)
- 2018 - Roman Women at the Palace of Fine Arts
- 2018 - CAESAR MAXIMUS at the Music Concourse
- 2018 - Mother Lear (multiple locations, public and private including the Marin Civic Center)
- 2019 - Undiscovered Country at Sunnyside Conservatory
- 2019 - Mother Lear (multiple locations, public and private including Mission Hospice and as part the SF International Arts Festival)
