= Watershed Alliance of Marin =

Group of organizations

The Watershed Alliance of Marin is a 501(c)(3) non-profit network of organizations with a shared purpose of preserving the drainage basins of Marin County, California. In January 2013, it hoped coho salmon would return to the Lagunitas and Redwood creeks. In November 2014, it announced they did not.
