= Hawk Hill (California) =

Hill in California

- Location within California Location within the United States

Highest point
- Elevation: 923 ft (281 m) NAVD 88
- Prominence: 320 ft (98 m)
- Coordinates: 37°49′32″N 122°29′58″W

Geography
- Location: Marin County, California, U.S.
- Topo map: USGS San Francisco North

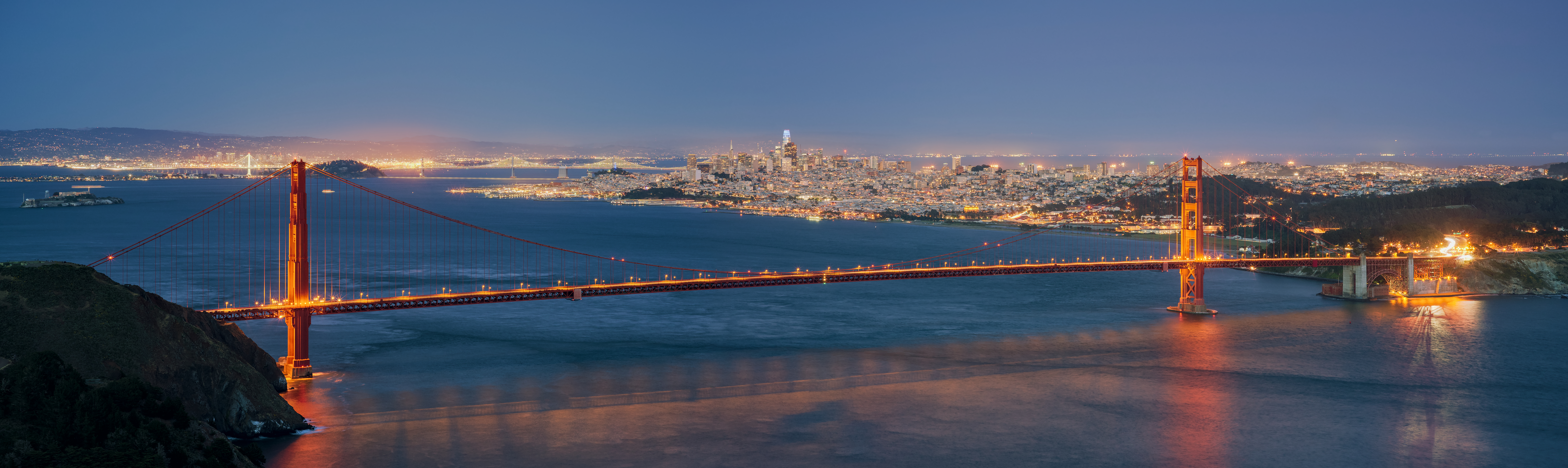
View of Golden Gate Bridge from Hawk Hill

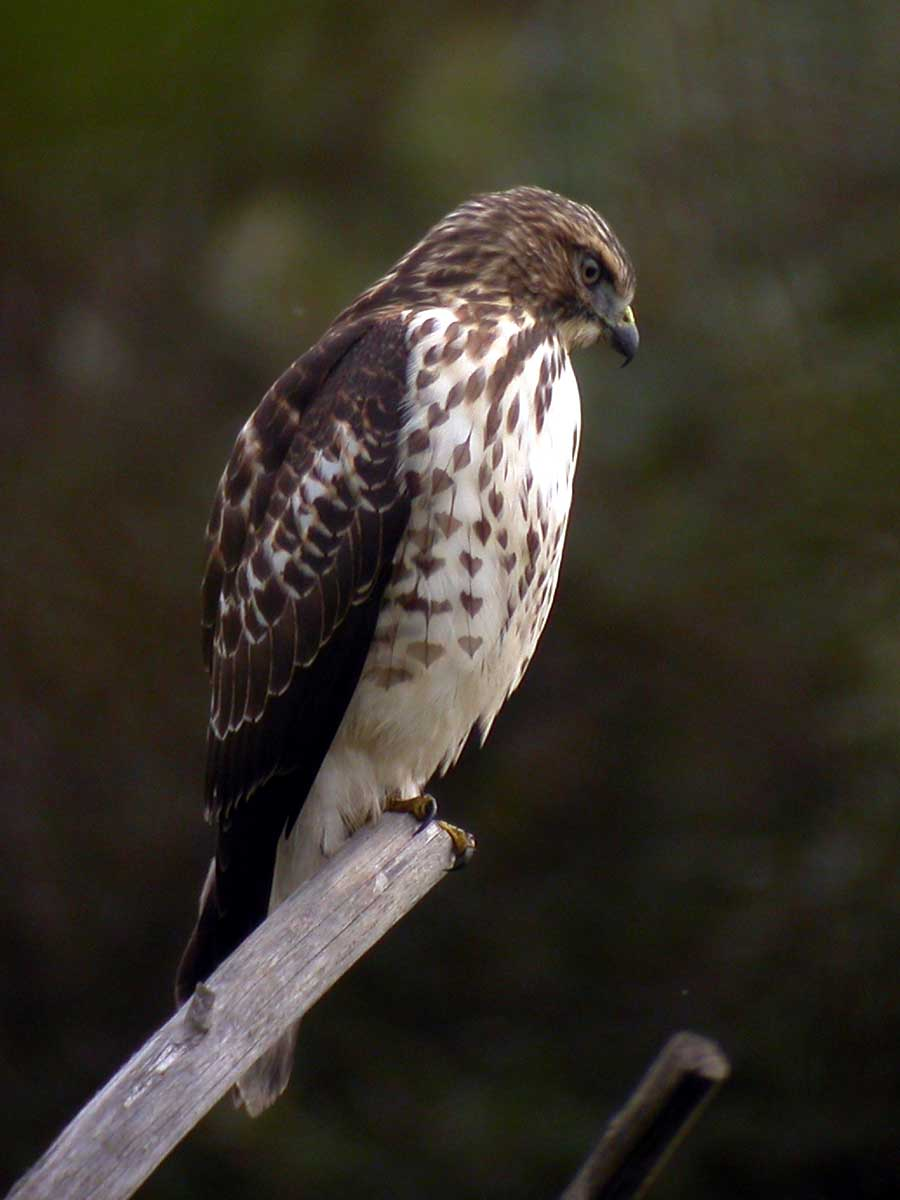
Broad-winged hawk (Buteo platypterus) seen at Hawk Hill.

Hawk Hill is a 923-foot (281 m) peak in the Marin Headlands, just north of the Golden Gate Bridge and across the Golden Gate strait from San Francisco, California. The hill is within the Golden Gate National Recreation Area.

It is the lookout point for the largest known flight of diurnal raptors in the Pacific states. Each autumn, from August into December, tens of thousands of hawks, kites, falcons, eagles, vultures, osprey, and harriers are funneled by the peninsular shape of Marin County into the headlands. Hawks avoid flight over water since warm thermals that provide lift are rare. Abundant populations of small mammals protected by the park are one resource that helps maintain the large number of visiting raptors in the Headlands during the fall, but the strong onshore winds hitting the hills of the Headlands provide cold updrafts and hot late summer days provide warm thermals that allow these birds to fly more efficiently.

Volunteers with the Golden Gate Raptor Observatory count and track this fall migration using bird-banding and radio-tracking techniques, all in cooperation with the National Park Service.

== Raptor observations ==
The following table lists the annual average number of sightings by the GGRO in the Marin Headlands during autumn, for the years 2001–2009.

Raptor species	Sightings per year
Turkey vulture	9,179
Osprey	105
White-tailed kite	92
Mississippi kite	< 1
Bald eagle	5
Northern harrier	751
Sharp-shinned hawk	4,187
Cooper's hawk	2,427
Northern goshawk	1
Red-shouldered hawk	464
Broad-winged hawk	123
Swainson's hawk	6
Red-tailed hawk	9,427
Ferruginous hawk	22
Rough-legged hawk	7
Golden eagle	20
American kestrel	542
Merlin	171
Peregrine falcon	199
Prairie falcon	8
Unidentified	1,291
TOTAL	29,028
