= Joseph A. Baer =

United States Army general

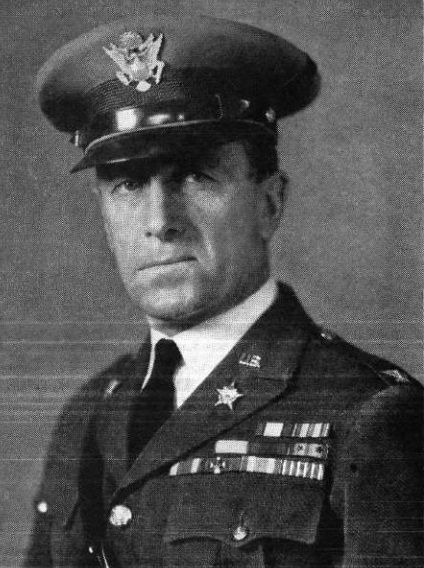
- Baer as Colonel
- Born: April 29, 1878; Kutztown, Pennsylvania, US
- Died: August 30, 1958 (aged 80); Greenwich, Connecticut, US
- Burial place: United States Military Academy Post Cemetery
- Military career
- Allegiance: United States of America
- Branch: United States Army
- Service years: 1900–1944
- Rank: Brigadier General
- Service number: 0-1090
- Unit: Cavalry Branch
- Commands: 2nd Cavalry Brigade; 7th Cavalry Regiment; 11th Cavalry Regiment
- Conflicts: Boxer Rebellion; Philippine–American War; Moro Rebellion; World War I; Battle of Saint-Mihiel; Meuse–Argonne offensive; World War II
- Awards: Distinguished Service Medal; Silver Star; Legion of Merit

Joseph Augustus Baer (April 29, 1878 – August 30, 1958) was a highly decorated officer in the United States Army with the rank of brigadier general. A veteran cavalry officer of several conflicts, he distinguished himself first during the fighting with Moro rebels in the Philippines in 1909 and then during his service with the American Expeditionary Forces during World War I.

He rose to the rank of general during World War II and served as chief of staff, Second Service Command with headquarters at Governors Island, New York for most of the war. While in this capacity he was responsible for the civil defense of New York, New Jersey and Delaware before retiring in early 1944 due to his age.

== Early career ==
Joseph A. Baer was born on April 29, 1878 in Kutztown, Pennsylvania as the son of Dr. Samuel Adam Baer and his wife Clara Hartman Baer. His father was one of the most prominent educators of Pennsylvania, and served as superintendent of the schools of Berks County for six years and city superintendent of the schools of Reading, Pennsylvania for almost ten years. Joseph graduated from the Reading High School in summer of 1895 and secured an appointment to the United States Military Academy at West Point, New York.

Baer entered the Academy as a cadet in June 1896. Among his classmates were future generals including Walter S. Grant, Upton Birnie Jr., Augustine McIntyre Jr., Archibald H. Sunderland, and Charles M. Wesson. Baer reached the rank of cadet-captain, commanding the Company C, and graduated on June 13, 1900.

He was commissioned second lieutenant in the United States Cavalry on the same date .He was assigned to 6th Cavalry Regiment located in China as a part of the International China Relief Expedition, with the objective of relieving the defenders of the Beijing Legation Quarter in Beijing during the Boxer Rebellion. He remained in China until the end of May 1931, when he accompanied the regiment to Manila. He was promoted to first lieutenant of cavalry in February 1901.

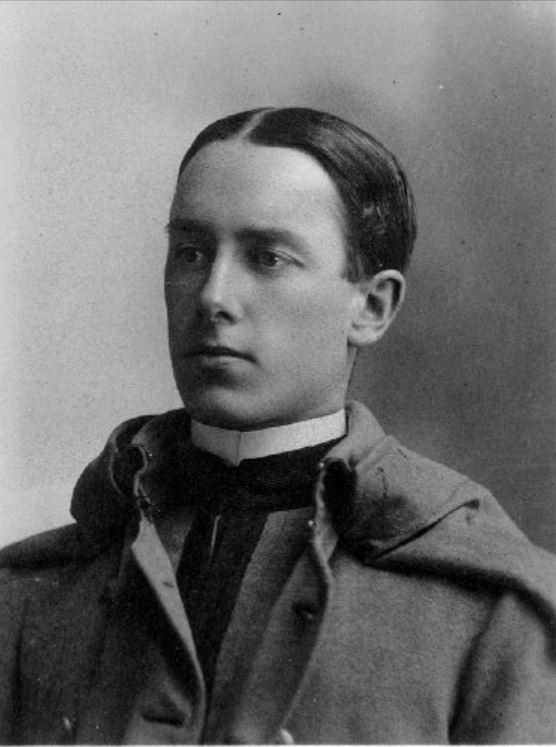
Baer as a cadet at United States Military Academy in 1900

During his service in the Philippines, Baer participated in the counter-insurgency patrols against Emilio Aguinaldo's rebels until July 1903, when the 6th Cavalry was ordered back to the United States. He was subsequently transferred back to the Military Academy at West Point, where he assumed duty as an instructor of Mathematics.

=== Moro Rebellion ===
After four years at West Point, Baer rejoined the 6th Cavalry and embarked for the Philippines again. Their task was now to conduct military operations against the Moro people, who were trying to resist American presence in the Philippines. The Moro people were Muslims who also held practices unacceptable for Americans including slavery or juramentado, a form of jihad in which a devotee attempted to kill as many Christians as possible in order to gain a place in paradise.

Baer and his regiment were ordered to capture or kill several rebel leaders who were responsible for the deaths of several hundreds of civilians. According to the military intelligence, rebel leaders Jikiri and Sarial and their groups were located at Patian Island in the south of Jolo archipelago.

The U.S. troops formed several groups and were able to encircle the Moro rebels in the cave system on Patian Island on July 4, 1909. American forces launched attacks against rebels hiding in the caves, but the rebels almost immediately charged the Americans in suicide attacks, armed with rifles, knives and swords. Fellow U.S. officer Second Lieutenant John T. Kennedy was leading the attack in one of the cave entrances when another fanatical rebel leader called Lallic assaulted him with a barong sword. Kennedy was cut in the back of the neck, and Lallic was preparing to stab him, but Baer shot and killed Lallic with his pump shotgun. Kennedy survived the attack thanks to Baer's action, but spent several months in hospital.

Baer later received a Silver Star citation for this act of bravery. He remained with the 6th Cavalry in the Philippines, was promoted to captain of cavalry in March 1911, and returned to the United States that July.

=== World War I ===
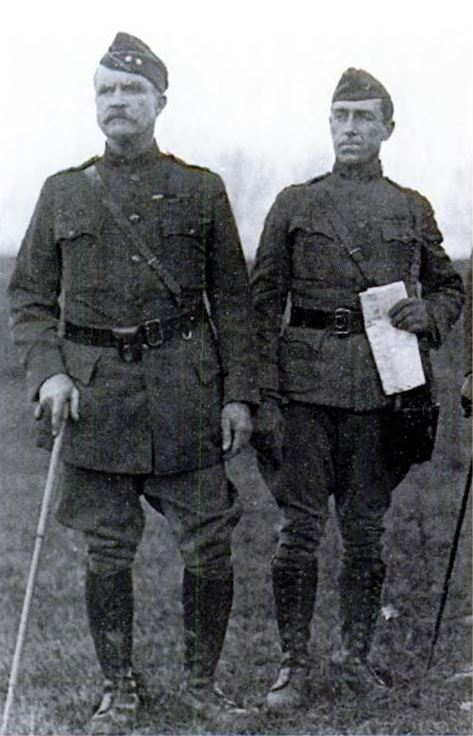
Baer (right) with Major General Andre W. Brewster in France in early 1918

Baer then returned to West Point and assumed duty as an instructor of Chemistry. He served in that capacity until January 1915. During that time, he taught cadets from the Class of 1915 ("The class the stars fell on"), who included future five-star generals Dwight D. Eisenhower and Omar N. Bradley. Baer was subsequently transferred to the 2nd Cavalry Regiment at Fort Ethan Allen, Vermont as commanding officer of Company I, and participated in the training of the National Guard units until May 1916, when his unit was ordered to Plattsburgh, New York, where the first Citizens' Military Training Camp was established. Baer served as adjutant of the camp at the time of the United States' entry into World War I, and was promoted to major of cavalry in August 1917.

In early December 1917, Baer was transferred to the Office of the Inspector General of the United States Army for an inspector orientation course. Upon its completion, he was promoted to the temporary rank of lieutenant colonel and was assigned as divisional inspector to the newly formed 15th Cavalry Division in El Paso, Texas. While in this capacity, he quickly became assistant to the divisional chief of staff, and helped prepare plans for the organization and training of the division.

Baer served in El Paso until the end of July 1918, when he embarked for France. He subsequently joined the headquarters of the American Expeditionary Forces in Chaumont and assumed duty as assistant to Inspector-General, Major General Andre W. Brewster. He served as executive officer for Brewster and coordinated the inspector-general officers from Brewster's staff assigned to units of the First Army. Subordinated inspector-generals were tasked to describe the tactical situation of the assigned unit, ammunition status, and morale, and make specific recommendations to improve operations. Baer subsequently passed this reports to Plans and Operations officers (G-3) on Corps or Army level, who subsequently took the corrective actions to improve the situation or conditions of the troops.

Baer took part in the daily inspection of U.S. units with General Brewster, and received a temporary promotion to colonel on September 20, 1918. He also made frequent inspection visits of frontline units in Fismes Sector during the Saint-Mihiel Offensive and Meuse–Argonne offensive. Baer's service was recognized by Brewster, who nominated him for the Army Distinguished Service Medal.

== Interwar period ==
Following the armistice, Baer was instructed by Brewster to join occupation units in the Rhineland and set up a liaison section between general headquarters of American Expeditionary Forces in Chaumont and occupation forces headquarters in Trier. He was subsequently tasked to forward daily reports on the observations for the use of General John J. Pershing and his staff.

In late April 1919, Baer was transferred to Padua, Italy, where he became an inspector at Base Section No. 8, Services of Supply. He served in that capacity during the unification of Italy and returned to the headquarters of American Expeditionary Forces in Chaumont that May. He also received war service medals from the Government of Italy for his service in Padua.

Baer returned to the United States in July 1919. After a brief leave at home, he was assigned to the Office of the Inspector General of the Army in Washington, D.C. He was reverted to his permanent rank of major in April 1920, but received a promotion to lieutenant-colonel of cavalry in July that year. He served under Major General John L. Chamberlain until September 1920, when he entered the instruction at the Army War College. Baer graduated the following June and entered the Army Command and General Staff School at Fort Leavenworth, Kansas.

Upon completing a two-year instruction at the Command and General Staff School in June 1923, he was ordered back to the Army War College and assumed duty as an instructor. Baer spent a year there, and joined the Plans and Operations Division (G-3), War Department General Staff where he was tasked with the review of the training plans as a chief of Troop Training Section.

Baer testified at the court martial of Brigadier General Billy Mitchell as a witness for the prosecution. He opposed Mitchell's statement in which he accused the United States Army of incompetency.

After several years of staff duty, Baer requested to be assigned to field command, and joined 11th Cavalry Regiment at Presidio of Monterey, California in October 1927.

He served as an executive officer of that regiment for almost two years. Following his promotion to colonel of cavalry, he assumed command of 11th Cavalry in August 1929. Baer was subsequently ordered to the Office of Chief of Army Intelligence in Washington, D.C. for briefing, and then ordered to Europe for duty as military attaché to Austria and Czechoslovakia with seat in Vienna. He remained in that capacity until July 1933, and witnessed Adolf Hitler's rise to power in Germany.

Baer returned to the United States. After two months' leave of absence, he assumed duty as commanding officer of the 7th Cavalry Regiment at Fort Bliss, Texas. His regiment was a part of the 2nd Cavalry Brigade under Brigadier General George Vidmer. When Vidmer retired in August 1935, Baer temporarily replaced him as brigade commander.

In October 1935, Baer was transferred to Baltimore, Maryland and assumed duty as chief of staff, Third Corps Area under Major General Albert J. Bowley. In this capacity he was co-responsible for the administrative, training, and tactical tasks of several subordinated divisions of the Regular Army, Organized Reserve, and National Guard of the United States.

== World War II ==
In late August 1939, Baer was transferred to Governors Island, New York, and joined the staff of Second Corps Area under Major General Hugh A. Drum as officer-in-charge of the National Guard Affairs. In October 1940, he was appointed chief of staff of the Second Corps Area under Drum, and continued in this capacity under new commanding general, Irving J. Phillipson, a few months later. Meanwhile in July the control of tactical forces was removed from the corps areas with the creation of General Headquarters, United States Army, leaving the corps areas with administrative responsibilities only.

Following the United States' entry into World War II, the corps areas were renamed service commands in July 1942 in order to reflect their status as administrative and supply agencies. Baer now served as chief of staff, Second Service Command under Major General Thomas A. Terry. While in this capacity, he also served as civil defense chief for New York, New Jersey and Delaware.

He was promoted to brigadier general on April 25, 1943. He administratively retired five days later upon reaching the mandatory retirement age. Baer was recalled to active duty the following day, and remained on active duty until January 31, 1944, when he retired from active service. For his service during the war, he was decorated with the Legion of Merit.

== Retirement ==
After his retirement, Baer served as director of services for the Armed Forces for the National Foundation for Infantile Paralysis, and remained in that capacity until January 1958.

He was married to Lelia Lee Baer (1880–1961), whose father was a first cousin to General Robert E. Lee. They had one daughter, Lelia.

Baer died of cancer on August 30, 1958, aged 80, at his home in Greenwich, Connecticut. He was buried with full military honors at United States Military Academy Post Cemetery.

== Decorations ==
Here is the ribbon bar of Brigadier General Baer:

1st Row	Army Distinguished Service Medal		
2nd Row	Silver Star	Legion of Merit	Spanish War Service Medal
3rd Row	China Campaign Medal	Philippine Campaign Medal	World War I Victory Medal with two battle clasps
4th Row	Army of Occupation of Germany Medal	American Defense Service Medal	American Campaign Medal
5th Row	World War II Victory Medal	Commemorative Medal of the Unity of Italy	Commemorative Medal for the Italo-Austrian War 1915–1918
