= Upton Birnie Jr. =

US Army major general (1877–1957)

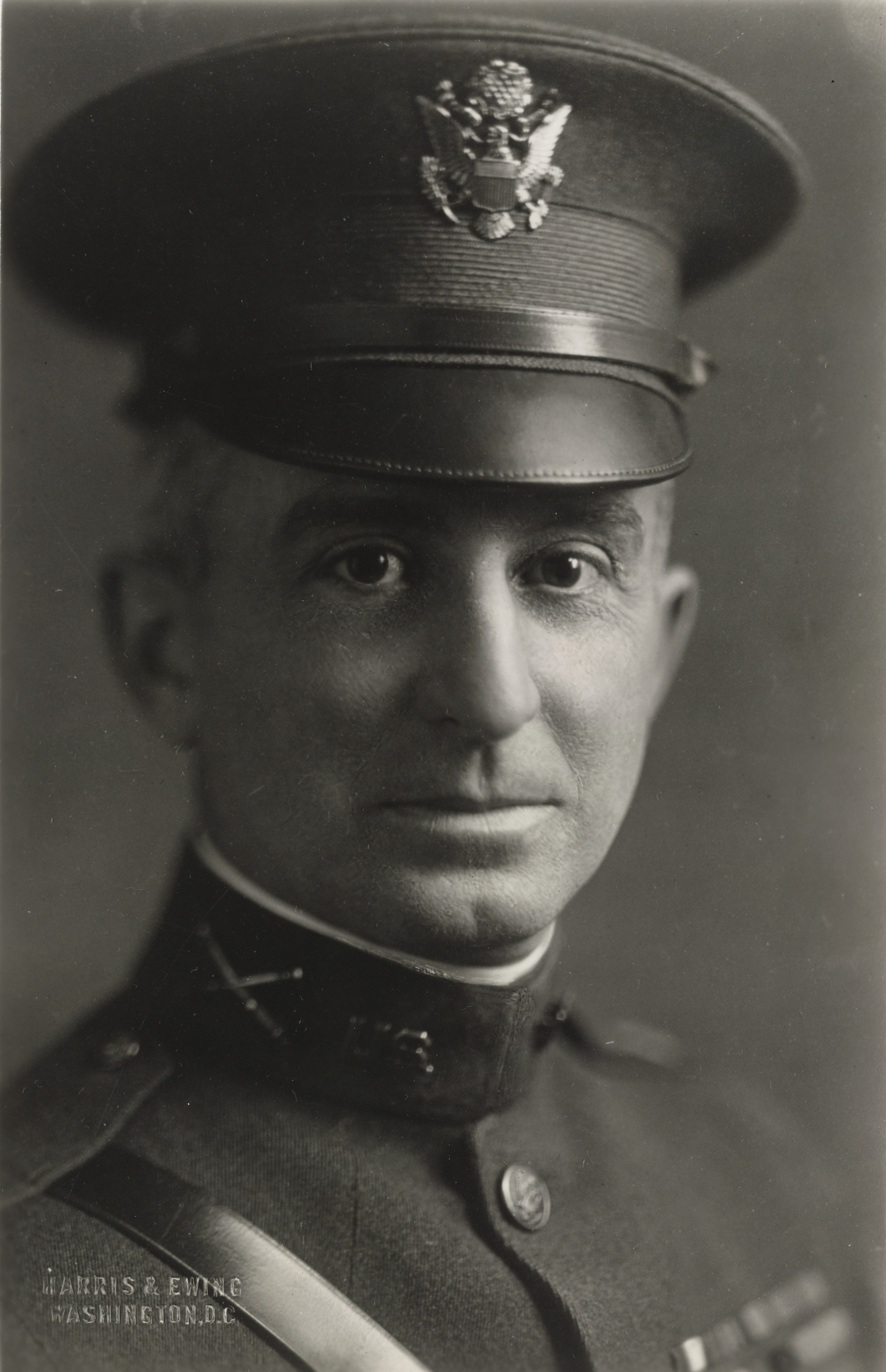
- Birnie as a lieutenant colonel in 1934
- Born: July 7, 1877; Carlisle, Pennsylvania, US
- Died: October 15, 1957 (aged 80); Washington, District of Columbia, US
- Burial place: Arlington National Cemetery
- Education: United States Military Academy; United States Army Command and General Staff College; United States Army War College
- Spouse: Sue Taylor Schenck (m. 1903–1950)
- Children: 2
- Military career
- Service: United States Army
- Service years: 1900–1938
- Rank: Major General
- Service number: 01101
- Unit: US Army Field Artillery Branch
- Commands: 29th Field Artillery Battery; Battery A, 6th Artillery Regiment; 13th Company, National Army Training Center, Camp Bullis; 1st Battalion, 6th Field Artillery Regiment; 2nd Field Artillery Regiment; 5th Field Artillery Regiment; 1st Field Artillery Brigade; Fort Ethan Allen; 7th Field Artillery Regiment; 24th Field Artillery Regiment; Chief of Field Artillery
- Conflicts: United States Military Government in Cuba; Mexican Border War; World War I Occupation of the Rhineland
- Awards: Army Distinguished Service Medal

Upton Birnie Jr. (7 July 1877 – 15 October 1957) was a career officer in the United States Army. A 1900 graduate of the United States Military Academy, he served from 1900 to 1938 and attained the rank of major general. Birnie was a veteran of World War I and was a recipient of the Army Distinguished Service Medal.

A native of Carlisle, Pennsylvania, Birnie was raised and educated in Philadelphia and was a 1900 graduate of the United States Military Academy. Assigned to the Field Artillery, Birnie served in the United States Military Government in Cuba and Mexican Border War as he worked his way through the ranks in command and staff assignments of increasing responsibility. During World War I, he served in the Operations section (G-3) on the American Expeditionary Forces staff and took part in several battles. After duty during the Occupation of the Rhineland, he returned to the United States, where he continued to command Field Artillery units and carry out high-level staff assignments.

In 1934, Birnie was appointed Chief of Field Artillery with the temporary rank of major general. He retired as a major general in 1938, and resided in Washington, D.C. and Blue Ridge Summit, Pennsylvania. Birnie died in Washington on 15 October 1957 and was buried at Arlington National Cemetery.

== Early life ==
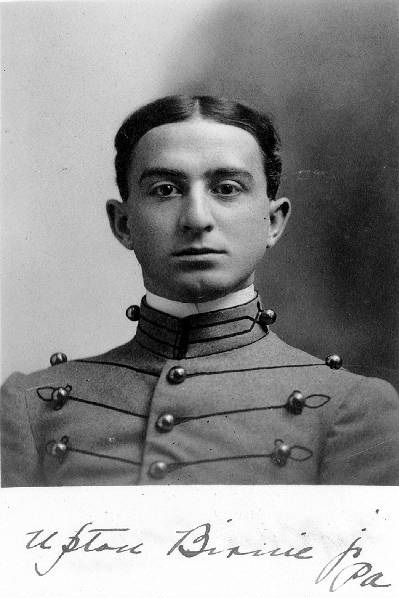
Birnie as a West Point cadet in 1900

Upton Birnie Jr. was born in Carlisle, Pennsylvania on 7 July 1877, a son of clothing store manager Upton Birnie and Susan (Galt) Birnie. His brother Samuel Galt Birnie (1875–1938) was a prominent attorney in Philadelphia. His uncle Rogers Birnie (1851–1939) was a career U.S. Army officer who retired as a colonel.

Birnie was raised and educated in Philadelphia and graduated from Central High School in 1896. After graduating, he received an appointment to the United States Military Academy from US Representative John E. Reyburn of Pennsylvania's 4th congressional district. Birnie graduated in 1900 ranked 23rd of 54 and received his commission as a second lieutenant of Field Artillery.

Among Birnie's classmates who also attained general officer rank were: Robert E. Wood; Walter S. Grant; Charles M. Wesson, Archibald H. Sunderland; and Augustine McIntyre Jr.

== Start of career ==
Birnie was initially assigned to the 6th Artillery Regiment and posted to Havana during the United States Military Government in Cuba, and he remained in Havana until January 1902. He was promoted to first lieutenant in July 1901. He performed duty at Fort Sill, Oklahoma from January 1902 to October 1903. He was then posted to Fort Leavenworth, Kansas as commander of the 29th Field Artillery Battery, where he remained until September 1904.

In October 1904 Birnie was detailed for temporary duty with the Ordnance Corps. He was Ordnance officer for the Artillery District of Puget Sound until June 1906, with duty first at Fort Casey, Washington, and later at Washington's Fort Worden. From June 1906 to June 1907, he was a student at Fort Leavenworth's Infantry and Cavalry Course, which he completed as a distinguished graduate. Birnie was promoted to captain in January 1907.

From June 1907 to June 1908, Birnie was a student at the United States Army Command and General Staff College. From June to September 1908, he was posted to Fort Riley, Kansas and Camp Alexander Hays Jr., Pennsylvania as instructor of National Guard units and umpire of National Guard war games. He was then assigned to the 6th Field Artillery at Fort Riley, Kansas, first as commander of Battery A, and later as regimental adjutant. From March to July 1911, Birnie was adjutant of the artillery brigade for an experimental maneuver division that conducted activities at Fort Sam Houston, Texas. He was then assigned as a student at the United States Army War College, from which he graduated in July 1912.

== Continued career ==
After completing the Army War College, Birnie was assigned as inspector and instructor of New York National Guard units in and around New York City. In December 1912, he returned to the 6th Field Artillery at Fort Riley, where he commanded a battery. In June 1913, Birnie transferred to the 2nd Field Artillery Regiment, and he served with this unit in the Philippines, first as a battalion adjutant, then as commander of a battery. In addition, Birnie was assigned to the Philippine Defense Board, an army panel that considered how best to provide for the coastal defense of the islands.

In November 1915, Birnie returned to the 6th Field Artillery and was posted to Camp Harry J. Jones, Arizona, during the Mexican Border War, where he commanded a battery and served as an instructor and inspector of a training camp for noncommissioned officers. In April 1917, The United States entered World War I. Birnie was promoted to major in May and assigned to Camp Bullis near Leon Springs, Texas, where he commanded the 13th Company of the National Army Training Center. In June 1917, he returned to Camp Jones, where he was assigned as commander of the 6th Field Artillery's 1st Battalion.

In August 1917, Birnie received promotion to temporary colonel and assignment to the American Expeditionary Forces staff in France. As a primary assistant chief of staff for plans, operations, and training (G-3), he planned and oversaw execution of numerous military operations. He took part in the Battle of Chemin des Dames, Battle of Saint-Mihiel, and Meuse–Argonne offensive. After the Armistice of November 11, 1918 ended the war, Birnie remained on duty in Europe during the Occupation of the Rhineland. His wartime performance of duty was recognized with award of the Army Distinguished Service Medal. In addition, he received the Order of Leopold II (Officer) from Belgium, the Legion of Honor (Officer) from France, and the Order of Saints Maurice and Lazarus (Officer) from Italy.

== Later career ==
Birnie returned to the United States in August 1919 and was posted to Camp Zachary Taylor, Kentucky. He successively commanded the 2nd Field Artillery Regiment, 5th Field Artillery Regiment, and 1st Field Artillery Brigade as they completed their post-war drawdown and demobilization. He remained at Camp Taylor through January 1920, and was promoted to the permanent rank of lieutenant colonel in September 1919 while continuing to serve as a temporary colonel. In February 1920, he was assigned to Governors Island, New York as assistant chief of staff for operations (G-3) of the Second Corps Area, and he remained in this assignment until August 1920. In June 1920, he was reduced in rank from temporary colonel to permanent lieutenant colonel.

In August 1920, Birnie was assigned a second time as a student at the United States Army War College, and he graduated in June 1921. From June 1921 to July 1925 he served as an instructor at the war college. In August 1925, he was posted to Fort Ethan Allen, Vermont as commander of the post and the 7th Field Artillery Regiment. From February to May 1926, Birnie was assigned temporarily to Fort Sill, where he was a student at the Feld Artillery Refresher Course for senior officers. In August 1927, he was assigned to the War Department General Staff as chief of the Military Intelligence branch (G-2). He was promoted to permanent colonel in February 1929.

From September to November 1931, Birnie served as acting adjutant of the Second Corps Area. From December 1931 to March 1934, he served in the Philippines as commander of the 24th Field Artillery Regiment (Philippine Scouts). In March 1934, Birnie was selected to succeed Harry Gore Bishop as Chief of Field Artillery with the temporary rank of major general. He served until August 1938, when he retired as a major general. As Field Artillery chief, Birnie opposed new tactics developed by Orlando Ward and other instructors at the Field Artillery School, including forward observers to control indirect fire and fire direction centers to mass artillery on the most valuable targets. After a successful demonstration at the Artillery School with General George C. Marshall in attendance, Marshall, the Chief of Staff of the United States Army, directed Robert M. Danford, Birnie's successor, to implement the reforms.

== Retirement and death ==
In retirement, Birnie resided in Washington, D.C. and maintained a summer home in Blue Ridge Summit, Pennsylvania. He died in Washington on 15 October 1957. Birnie was buried at Arlington National Cemetery.

== Family ==
In April 1903, Birnie married Sue Taylor Schenck. She died in 1950, and he did not remarry. They were the parents of two daughters, Sue and Margaret. Sue Schenck Birnie was a teacher and the wife of Francis I. Brady of Portsmouth, Rhode Island. Margaret Birnie was the wife of John M. Capron; they later divorced, and she was a longtime employee of the United States International Trade Commission.

== Awards ==
=== U.S. awards ===
Birnie's U.S. awards included:

- Army Distinguished Service Medal
- World War I Victory Medal with 3 battle clasps
- Army of Cuban Occupation Medal
- Spanish War Service Medal
- Mexican Border Service Medal

=== Foreign awards ===
Birnie's foreign awards included:

- Order of Leopold II (Officer) (Belgium)
- Legion of Honor (Officer) (France)
- Order of Saints Maurice and Lazarus (Officer) (Italy)

=== Distinguished Service Medal citation ===
Birnie received the Army Distinguished Service Medal with the following words of acknowledgement:

The President of the United States of America, authorized by Act of Congress, July 9, 1918, takes pleasure in presenting the Army Distinguished Service Medal to Colonel (Field Artillery) Upton Birnie Jr., United States Army, for exceptionally meritorious and distinguished services to the Government of the United States, in a duty of great responsibility during World War I. As principal assistant in the Operations Section, General Headquarters, American Expeditionary Forces, Colonel Birnie has by his thorough military knowledge, loyalty, and devotion to duty materially assisted in attaining the success of that section of the General Staff.

Service: United States Army Rank: Colonel (Field Artillery) Division: Operations Section, General Headquarters, American Expeditionary Forces Action Date: World War I Orders: War Department, General Orders No. 27 (1920)

== Effective dates of promotion ==
Birnie's effective dates of promotion were:

- Second Lieutenant, June 13, 1900
- First Lieutenant, July 1, 1901
- Captain, January 25, 1907
- Major, May 15, 1917
- Colonel (temporary), August 5, 1917
- Lieutenant Colonel, September 28, 1919 (continued to serve as temporary colonel)
- Lieutenant Colonel, June 30, 1920 (reduced from temporary colonel)
- Colonel, February 11, 1929
- Major General (temporary), March 10, 1934
- Major General (retired), August 31, 1938

== Works by ==
- "G.H.Q. And Its Relation to the War Department General Staff". The Coast Artillery Journal. Fort Monroe, Virginia: U.S. Army Coast Artillery School. December 1922. pp. 492–500 – via Google Books.
