= John Thomas Kennedy =

United States Army general and Medal of Honor recipient (1885–1969)

John T. Kennedy
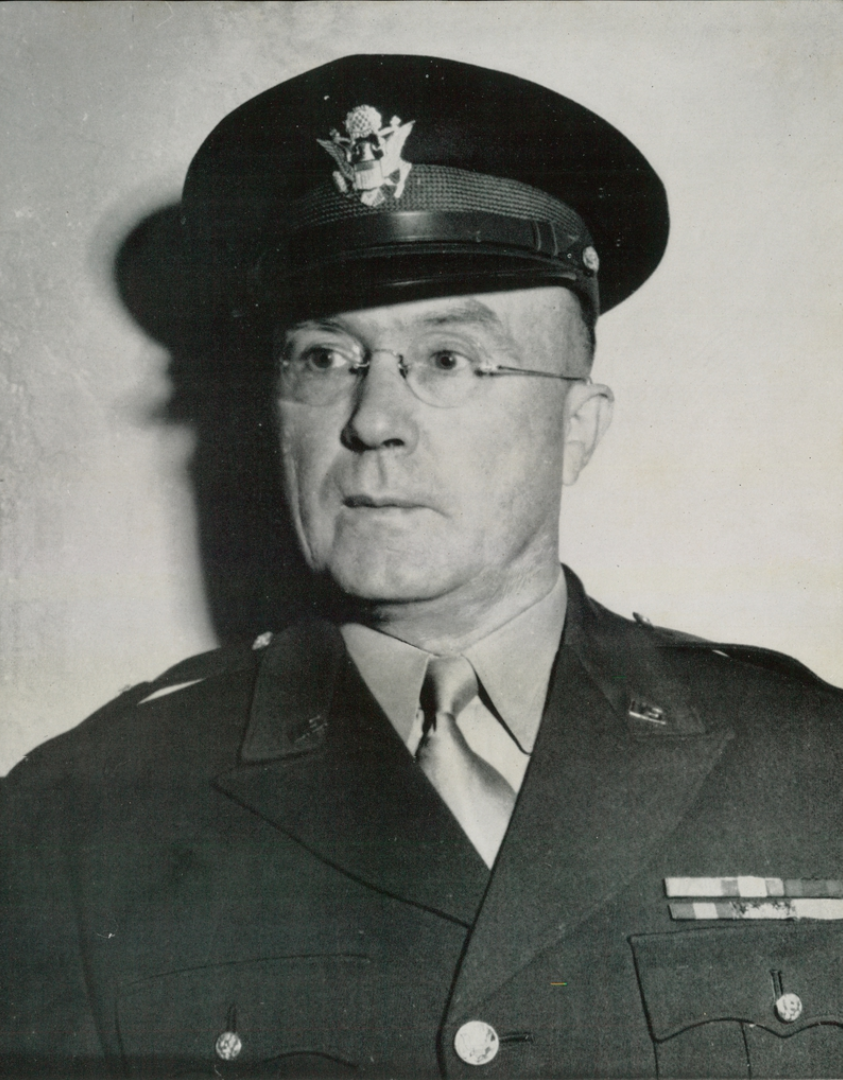
- Kennedy as Provisional Field Artillery Brigade commander c. 1942
- Born: July 22, 1885; Hendersonville, South Carolina, US
- Died: September 26, 1969 (aged 84); Columbia, South Carolina, US
- Burial place: Arlington National Cemetery, Virginia, US
- Military career
- Allegiance: United States
- Branch: United States Army
- Service years: 1908–1946
- Rank: Brigadier General
- Service number: 0-2360
- Unit: Field Artillery Branch
- Commands: Provisional Field Artillery Brigade; 8th Infantry Division Artillery; 5th Field Artillery Regiment
- Conflicts: Philippine–American War; Moro Rebellion; Occupation of Veracruz; Pancho Villa Expedition; World War I; Battle of Soissons; Battle of Saint-Mihiel; Meuse–Argonne offensive; World War II
- Awards: Medal of Honor; Distinguished Service Medal; Silver Star; Legion of Merit; Purple Heart

John Thomas Kennedy (July 22, 1885 – September 26, 1969) was a highly decorated officer in the United States Army with the rank of Brigadier General. He distinguished himself during the fighting with Moro rebels in the Philippines in 1909 and received the Congressional Medal of Honor, the United States Armed Forces' highest military decoration awarded for valor. He was the last surviving US veteran of the Philippine–American War to receive that medal.

Kennedy served in the Army for 36 years, distinguishing himself as Regimental commander in World War I. He rose to the general's rank in 1942 and commanded the training center at Fort Bragg during the World War II.

== Early life ==
John T. Kennedy was born on July 22, 1885, in Hendersonville, South Carolina as the son of farmer Silas Cox Kennedy and his wife Ida Susannah Catherine Funchess. He was second oldest child and had six siblings, growing up on his father's farm near Orangeburg, South Carolina. His family later moved to Orangeburg where young John received his early education. He was admitted to The Citadel, a noted military academy in Charleston, South Carolina but left after one year when he was able to secure an appointment to the United States Military Academy at West Point, New York.

=== Philippines ===
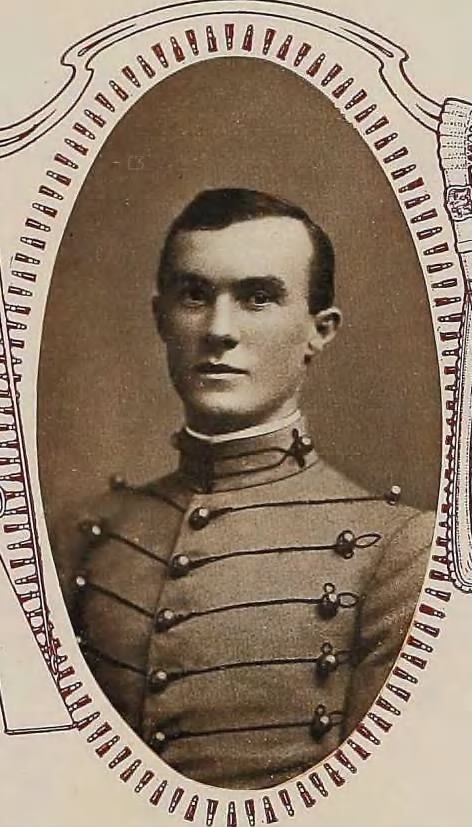
Kennedy as Cadet at West Point in 1908.

Kennedy entered the West Point in June 1904 and among his classmates were future generals including Simon B. Buckner Jr., Charles H. Bonesteel, James E. Chaney, John F. Curry, Charles P. Hall, Virgil L. Peterson, or Edwin M. Watson. During his time at the academy, he was an average Cadet, graduating on May 29, 1908, as "Clean Sleeve" (a Cadet-Private who was neither scholar, nor athlete, nor class leader). He was commissioned second lieutenant in the United States Cavalry on that date and joined the 6th Cavalry Regiment in Jolo, Philippines. The regiment was conducting military operations against Moro people, who were trying to resist American presence in the Philippines. The Moro people were Muslims who also held practices unacceptable for Americans including slavery or Juramentado, a form of Jihad in which a devotee attempted to kill as many Christians as possible in order to gain a place in paradise.

Following Kennedy's arrival he took part almost immediately in the skirmishes with Moro rebels and his unit was withdrawn to Manila in late November 1908. After two months garrison duty, his regiment returned to Jolo Island and resumed the operations against rebels. He took part in the expeditions against Jikiri rebel leader and his group in May 1909 and against Sarial rebel leader in June, but rebels and their groups retreated to Patian Island. These rebel group were terrorizing the civilians, killing hundreds of them on Jolo archipelago.

The U.S. troops encircled Moro rebels on Patian Island on July 4, 1909, as they were hiding in the caves. Kennedy was led a group of few enlisted men and voluntarily entered the cave as the first man. He was immediately attacked by fanatical rebel leader called Lallic who assaulted Kennedy with his Barong sword, cutting him in the back of the neck when Kennedy tried to retreat to better position. He tried to hit Kennedy with sword again but second lieutenant Joseph A. Baer was able to kill Lallic with pump shot gun. Kennedy survived the wound, but spent several months in hospital. For this act of bravery, Kennedy received the Congressional Medal of Honor, the United States Armed Forces' highest military decoration awarded for valor.

=== Mexico ===
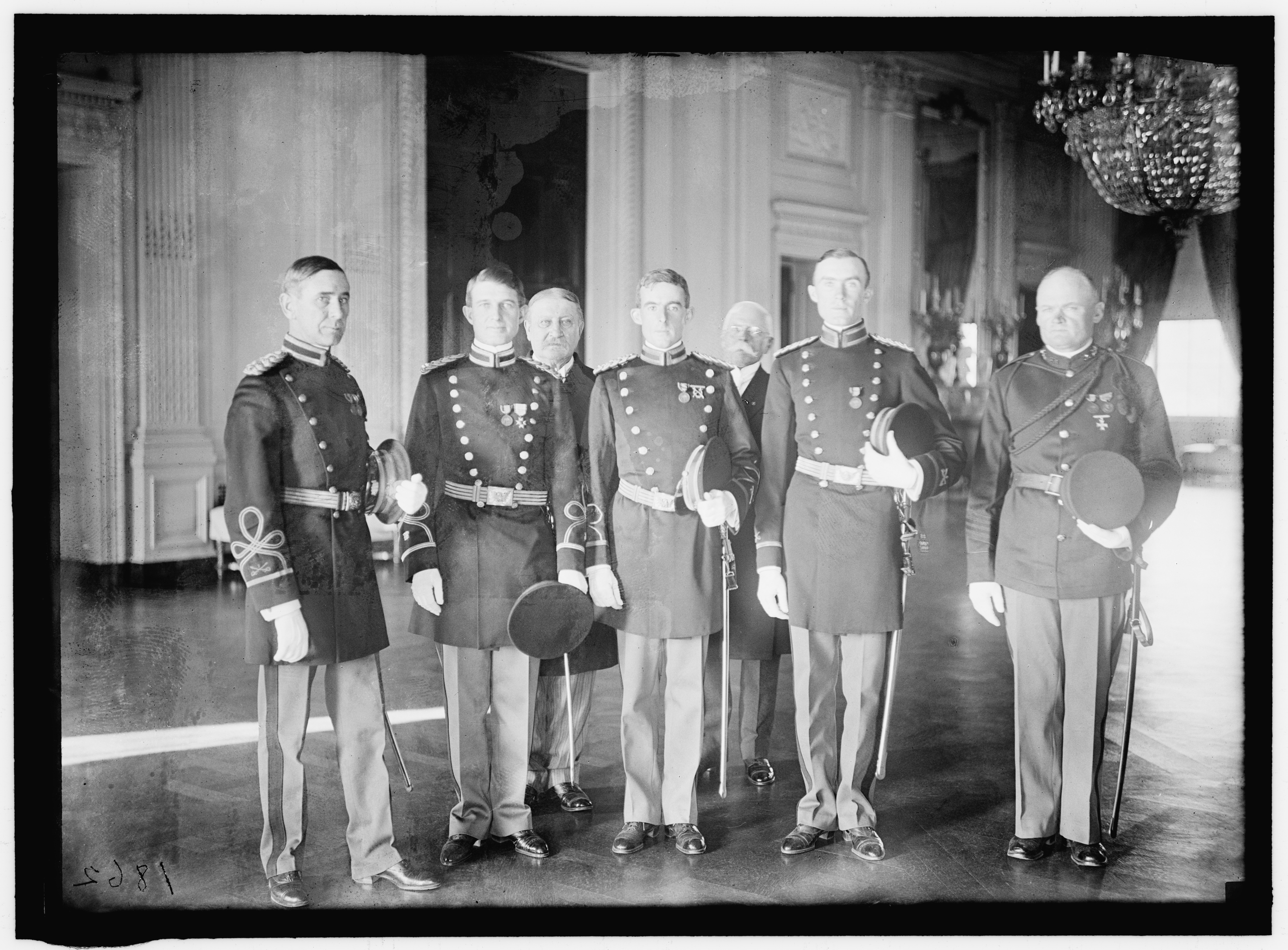
Kennedy (2nd from right) with other officers during the Medal of Honor ceremony at the White House on November 23, 1912.

Kennedy was declared fit for duty in November 1909 and rejoined his 6th Cavalry now located at Fort Des Moines, Iowa. Following the outbreak of Mexican Revolution, the security along the Mexico–United States border became even less stable than it already was. The 6th Cavalry was transferred to Fort Huachuca, Arizona in May 1911 and Kennedy commanded Troop B in the border patrols until early October 1911, when he was ordered for instruction to the School of Musketry at Presidio of Monterey, California.

Upon completion of the instruction in late December 1911, Kennedy rejoined his regiment at Fort Huachuca, but the 6th Cavalry was transferred back to Fort Des Moines, Iowa one month later. Kennedy spent several months there before received orders to enter the Mounted Service School at Fort Riley, Kansas in September 1912. He graduated following June and rejoined his regiment which was meanwhile ordered to Texas City, Texas for patrol duty along the border. After the Tampico Affair in April 1914, Kennedy and 6th Cavalry marched into the Mexican city of Veracruz and remained there until August.

Kennedy was then ordered back to the States and entered an Advanced Course at the Mounted Service School at Fort Riley, Kansas. He was promoted to first lieutenant of Cavalry on December 8, 1914, and upon graduation in June 1915, he was appointed an instructor in Equitation there.

However, on March 9, 1916, Mexican rebel Pancho Villa and his groups raided Columbus, New Mexico, sparking the Punitive Expedition into Mexico. Brigadier general John J. Pershing was tasked to organize a combined armed force of 10,000 men that will go to Mexico and capture Pancho Villa. Kennedy was assigned to that force and conducted patrol duty at Everts'Ranch, near Valentine, Texas until late August 1916. Even though Pershing's force penetrated 350 miles (560 km) into chaotic Mexico they failed to capture Pancho Villa.

Kennedy subsequently returned to Fort Riley and resumed his duty as an instructor in Equitation at the Mounted Service School. He served in this capacity until February 1917 when he requested to be transferred to Field Artillery. He was promoted to Captain of Field Artillery on February 26, 1917, and assigned to 7th Field Artillery Regiment stationed in San Antonio, Texas.

=== World War I ===
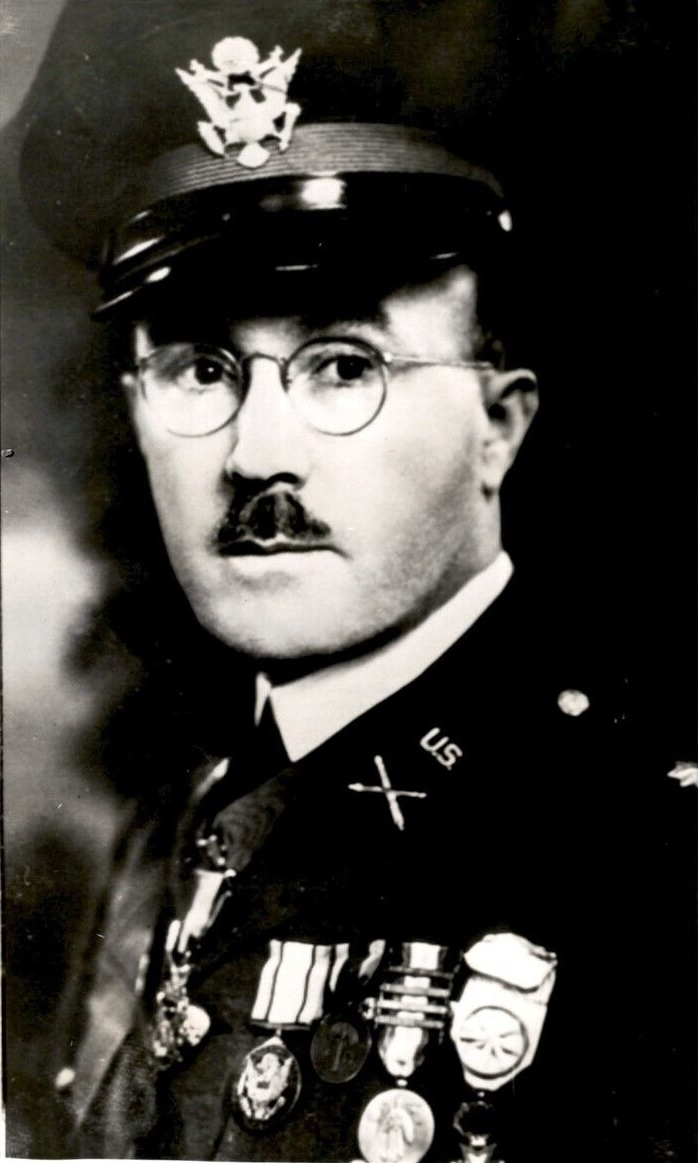
Kennedy as Major in World War I postwar years.

Following the United States entry into World War I in April 1917, Kennedy was transferred to 5th Field Artillery Regiment at Fort Bliss, Texas and began with training for deployment on the Western Front, departing in late July. He was promoted to the temporary rank of Major on August 5, 1917, and upon his arrival to France, Kennedy was ordered to the Artillery School at Camp Valdahon.

He completed the instruction in late October and moved to the frontlines with 1st Battalion of his regiment. Kennedy assumed command of the battalion at Cirfontaine, near Gondrecourt and led it until the end of November 1917. He was subsequently transferred to Camp Coëtquidan, near Rennes where he served as an instructor in Artillery Firing until the end of February 1918 when he was promoted to Director of Instruction.

Kennedy was promoted to the temporary rank of lieutenant colonel on June 25, 1918, and rejoined the 5th Field Artillery Regiment one month later, just in time for the last part of the attack of 1st Division near Soissons. He then took part in the combats at Bicqueley near Toul where he was appointed commanding officer, 5th Field Artillery Regiment.

After combats at the front in Saizerais sector, Kennedy led his regiment during the attack of 1st Division in reduction of Saint-Mihiel Salient in mid-September 1918 and then moved Meuse–Argonne where he was continually in combat until the signing of the Armistice on November 11, 1918. For his service during the War, Kennedy was decorated with Army Distinguished Service Medal.

Beside the Distinguished Service Medal, Kennedy also received Silver Star citation for bravery and Order of the Black Star, rank Officer by the Government of France.

== Interwar period ==
Following the Armistice, Kennedy led his regiment during the march into the Rhineland where he crossed the Rhine river in Coblenz, Germany and took positions on east bank. He was subsequently appointed Commandant of the Army School for Care of Animals before departing for the United States in late March 1919.

Kennedy was subsequently transferred to the Army Field Artillery School at Fort Sill, Oklahoma and served as an Instructor until June 1922. He was subsequently appointed to the Field Artillery Training Regulations Board at Fort Sill and remained in that assignment until September 1923. Meanwhile, during the postwar demobilization of the Army, he was reverted to his peacetime rank of Captain, but promoted to the permanent rank of Major in Field Artillery on July 1, 1920.

In September 1923, Kennedy was ordered to the Army Command and General Staff School at Fort Leavenworth, Kansas where he graduated with honors in June 1924. He was subsequently ordered to the Alabama Polytechnic Institute in Auburn, Alabama where he assumed duty as Professor of Military Science and Tactics with additional duty as an instructor of Reserve Officers' Training Corps unit there.

Upon completion of his duty at Alabama Polytechnic in August 1931, Kennedy entered the Army War College in Washington, D.C. and upon graduation in July 1932, he was promoted to the rank of lieutenant colonel and assigned to the Office of the Inspector General of the United States Army, War Department General Staff. Kennedy served under Major general John F. Preston until August 1936 when he was transferred to Fort Bragg, North Carolina and appointed Commanding officer, 2nd Battalion, 83rd Field Artillery Regiment.

Kennedy was promoted to Colonel in August 1938 and ordered back to the Army Field Artillery School at Fort Sill, Oklahoma for duty as Director, Department of Tactics and Signal Communication under School's Commandant, Brigadier general Augustine McIntyre.

== World War II ==
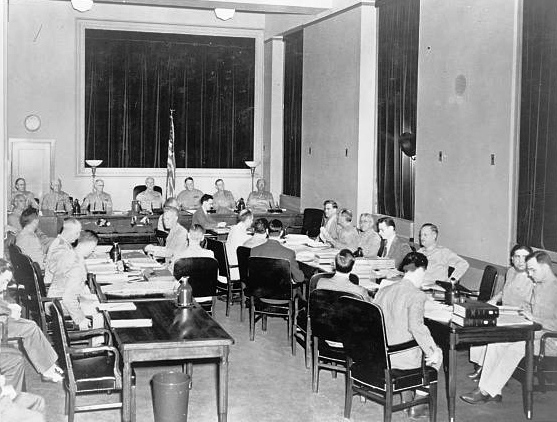
Trial of Nazi saboteurs in July 1942. Kennedy is sitting in the upper right corner.

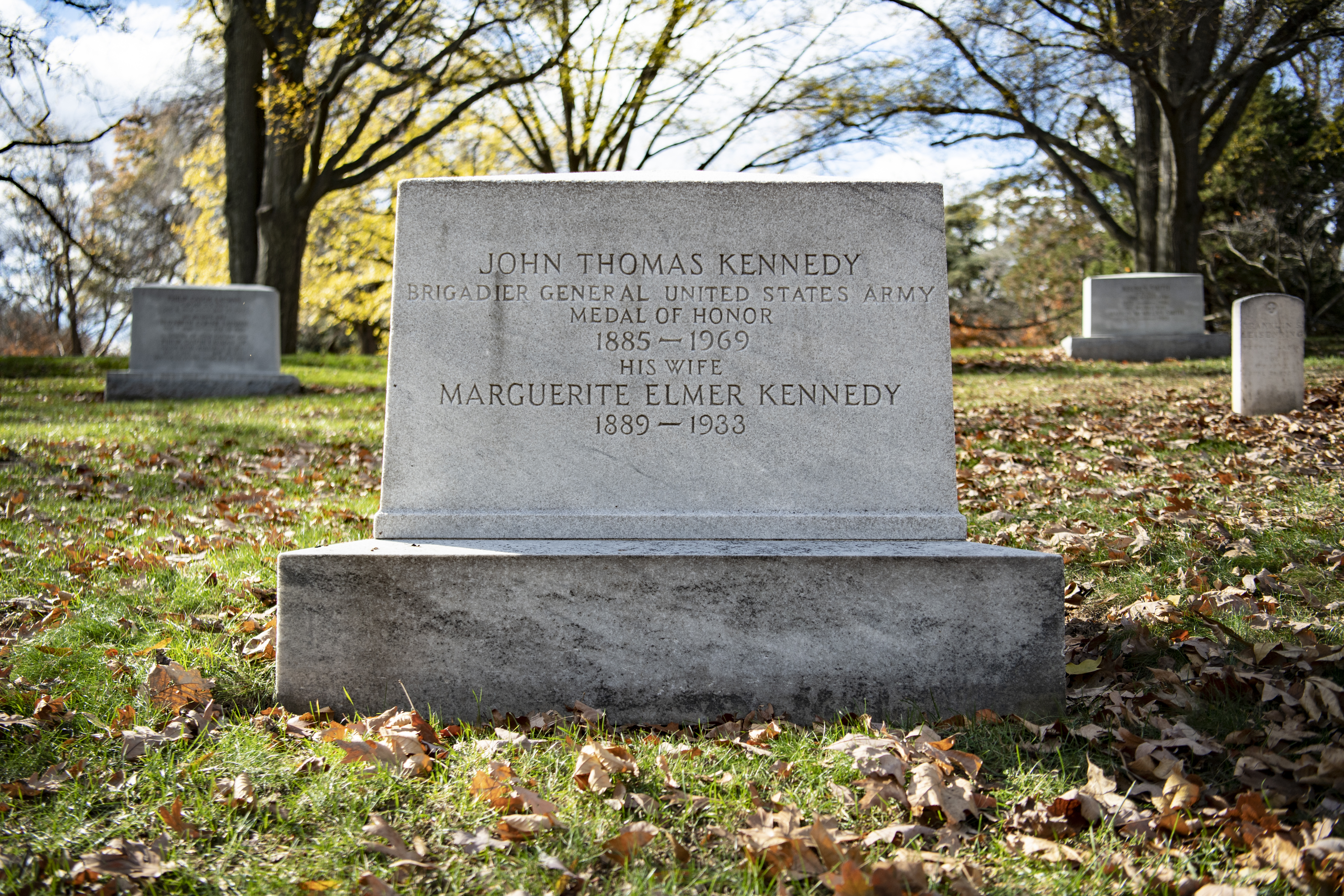
Grave at Arlington National Cemetery

Following the outbreak of World War II in September 1939, President Franklin D. Roosevelt declared a limited national emergency and newly appointed Army chief of staff General George C. Marshall set about expanding and modernizing the Army in preparation for war. Kennedy was co-responsible for the training of new recruits whose United States Army began accepting for newly created units during the massive build-up of the Army. One of that new unites was, 8th Infantry Division activated at Fort Jackson, South Carolina in July 1940.

Kennedy was transferred to that division under command of Major general James P. Marley and assumed duty as Commanding officer of the Divisional Artillery. He took part in the intensive training but his advanced age and poor health prevented Kennedy to remain with the division. He was relieved in late February 1941 and transferred to Fort Bragg, North Carolina for duty as Commanding Officer, Provisional Field Artillery Brigade there.

Following the United States entry into World War II, Kennedy assumed duty as Commanding officer, Fort Bragg, which served as the largest training center for Artillery units in the United States Army. He was promoted to Brigadier general on May 28, 1942, and his title was changed to Commanding general, Fort Bragg. Kennedy held this assignment for the duration of the war and various units trained at Fort Bragg during the War, including the 9th Infantry Division, 2nd Armored Division, 82nd Airborne Division, 100th Infantry Division, and various field artillery groups.

In July 1942, Kennedy was appointed a member of the seven-man Military Commission to try the eight Nazi saboteurs who were captured after landing on the Atlantic Coast from German submarines (Operation Pastorius).All saboteurs were sentenced to death, but sentences of two saboteurs were later commuted to life imprisonment.

Kennedy retired from active duty on January 31, 1946, after 38 years of commissioned service and received Legion of Merit for his service at Fort Bragg during the War. During his retirement, he was a member of the Presbyterian Church, Orangeburg Historical Society and the American Legion.

Brigadier general John T. Kennedy died due to complications from Coronary atherosclerosis at the Veterans Hospital in Columbia, South Carolina on September 26, 1969.

He was buried with full military honors at Arlington National Cemetery, Virginia in Section 7, plot 10076. His wife Marguerite Elmer Kennedy (1889–1933) is buried beside him. They had two children: son Elmer Bolton Kennedy (1911–2001) who also served in the U.S. Army and retired as Colonel; and a daughter Kathleen Bolton Kennedy Dibble (1917–2001).

== Decorations ==
Here is the ribbon bar of Brigadier general Kennedy:

1st Row	Medal of Honor		
2nd Row	Army Distinguished Service Medal	Silver Star	Legion of Merit
3rd Row	Purple Heart	Philippine Campaign Medal	Mexican Service Medal
4th Row	World War I Victory Medal with four battle clasps	Army of Occupation of Germany Medal	American Defense Service Medal
5th Row	American Campaign Medal	World War II Victory Medal	Order of the Black Star, rank Officer (France)

=== Medal of Honor citation ===
His citation contains following:

While in action against hostile Moros, he entered with a few enlisted men the mouth of a cave occupied by a desperate enemy, this act having been ordered after he had volunteered several times. In this action 2d Lt. Kennedy was severely wounded.

=== Distinguished Service Medal citation ===
His citation contains following:

As Regimental Commander during the St. Mihiel offensive and the Meuse-Argonne offensive, Lieutenant Colonel Kennedy displayed conspicuous efficiency, marked aggressiveness, and leadership. By his exceptional technical and executive ability he solved many perplexing problems, although much handicapped by losses in men, material, and animals. He at all times rendered invaluable support to the attacking Infantry and proved to be a material factor in the result achieved.

== See also ==
- List of Medal of Honor recipients
- List of Philippine–American War Medal of Honor recipients
- Notable graduates of West Point
