= Harry Gore Bishop =

United States Army general (1874–1934)

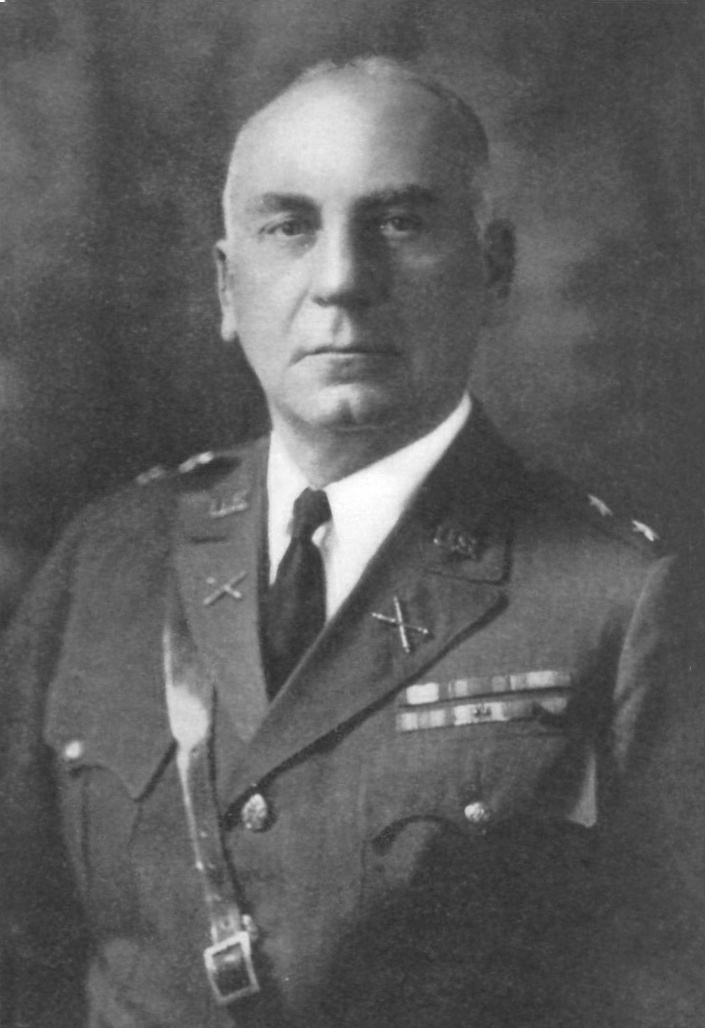
- Born: November 22, 1874; Grand Rapids, Michigan, U.S.
- Died: August 31, 1934 (aged 59); Washington, D.C., U.S.
- Military career
- Allegiance: United States of America
- Branch: United States Army
- Service years: 1897–1934
- Rank: Major general
- Service number: 0-254
- Commands: Chief of Field Artillery
- Conflicts: Pancho Villa Expedition; World War I
- Awards: Distinguished Service Medal; Legion of Honor (Officer) (France)
- Other work: Author

Harry Gore Bishop (November 22, 1874 – August 31, 1934) was a United States Army artillery general and author. He is most noted for his service as a Chief of Field Artillery branch of the Army between years 1930–1934.

== Early life and education ==
Bishop was born November 22, 1874, in Grand Rapids, Michigan. Bishop attended the United States Military Academy at West Point, graduating with the class of 1897.

== Career ==
In 1916, during the Mexican Revolution, Bishop served on the U.S.-Mexico border. In 1917, attempting to fly as a passenger in an airplane from San Diego, California to Calexico, California, he was forced to land in Mexico and was lost for nine days before being recovered by a search party.

On the entry of the United States into World War I, Bishop was promoted to brigadier general. Serving in France, he commanded the 159th Field Artillery Brigade and later the 3rd Artillery Brigade. He received the Army Distinguished Service Medal and the French Legion of Honor (Officer) for his service. The citation for his Army DSM reads:

The President of the United States of America, authorized by Act of Congress, July 9, 1918, takes pleasure in presenting the Army Distinguished Service Medal to Brigadier General Harry Gore Bishop, United States Army, for exceptionally meritorious and distinguished services to the Government of the United States, in a duty of great responsibility during World War I. While in Command of the 3d Field Artillery Brigade, during the battles of the Argonne-Meuse, and in the subsequent advance to Sedan, by his skill and able leadership, General Bishop rendered exceptionally valuable service.

Following the conclusion of the war, Bishop was made Chief of the Philippine Department. In 1925, he returned to the United States and commanded the 15th Field Artillery at Fort Sam Houston in Texas. Other appointments included Chief of the Hawaiian Department. While stationed in Hawaii, he commanded the 8th Field Artillery at Schofield Barracks.

In 1930, Bishop was promoted to major general and made Chief of Artillery and relocated to Washington, D.C. He served until March 1934 and was succeeded by Upton Birnie Jr.

== Family ==
Bishop's wife was Ella Van Horn Foulois, who had earlier divorced Maj. Gen. Benjamin Delahauf Foulois, Chief of the Army Air Corps.

== Retirement and death ==
On August 31, 1934, after suffering for a year from painful colitis, Bishop was notified that he was being retired for disability, with the rank of major general. He returned to his residence on 16th Street in Washington, and shot himself in the head. He was buried at Arlington National Cemetery, in Arlington, Virginia.

== Writings ==
As a young man, Bishop wrote several short stories, some of which would now be considered science fiction. These were:

- On the Martian Way, November 1907 in The Broadway Magazine. This story is notable for being one of the earliest to feature an imagined future society in which space travel is commonplace. It was reprinted in Amazing Stories (February, 1927) and in Star Magazine (July, 1931).
- Congealing the Ice Trust, December 1907 in The New Broadway Magazine
- Mogul, January 1912 in Everybody's Magazine.

Later works were purely military in character:

- Elements of Modern Field Artillery – U.S. Service (1914, 2nd ed. 1917)
- Operation Orders, Field Artillery: A Study in the Technique of Battle Orders (1916)
- Field Artillery: The King of Battles (1935)

== Bibliography ==
- Davis, Henry Blaine Jr. (1998). Generals in Khaki. Raleigh, North Carolina: Pentland Press, Inc. pp. 36–37. ISBN 1-57197-088-6.
