= Hendersonville, South Carolina =

- Unincorporated community
- Location within South Carolina Location within the United States
- Coordinates: 32°47′27″N 80°43′31″W
- Country: United States
- State: South Carolina
- County: Colleton
- Elevation: 39 ft (12 m)
- Time zone: UTC-5 (Eastern (EST))
  - Summer (DST): UTC-4 (EDT)
- Area codes: 843, 854
- GNIS feature ID: 1223119

Hendersonville is an unincorporated community in Colleton County, South Carolina, United States. It is located along U.S. Alternate Route 17 south of Walterboro.

John Thomas Kennedy (1885-1969), United States Army Brigadier General and recipient of the Medal of Honor was born in Hendersonville.
