= Edward Bancroft Williston =

Union Army Civil War officer and Medal of Honor recipient

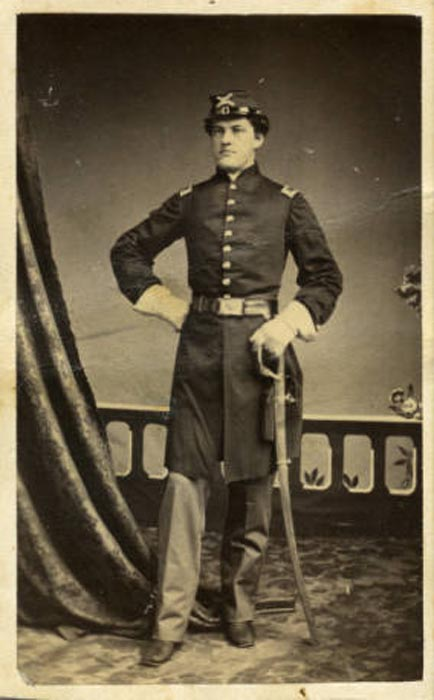
- First Lieutenant Edward Williston c. 1860–1864
- Born: July 15, 1837; Norwich, Vermont, U.S.
- Died: April 24, 1920 (aged 82); San Diego, California, U.S.
- Burial place: Arlington National Cemetery
- Military career
- Allegiance: United States of America; Union
- Branch: United States Army
- Service years: 1861–1900
- Rank: Brigadier General
- Unit: 2nd Artillery Regiment
- Commands: 6th Artillery Regiment
- Conflicts: American Civil War; Battle of Gettysburg; Battle of Trevilian Station; Third Battle of Winchester; Spanish–American War
- Awards: – Medal of Honor

Edward Bancroft Williston (July 15, 1837 – April 24, 1920) was a brigadier general in the United States Army. He was a recipient of the Medal of Honor for gallantry during the American Civil War.

== Biography ==
Williston was born in Norwich, Vermont, the son of Ebenezer Bancroft Williston, a Norwich Academy professor. He was the half-brother of Union Army Brevet Brigadier General Henry Stanton Burton. The younger Williston attended Norwich University from 1851 to 1855, but left shortly before graduating to work as an assistant engineer in Pennsylvania. In 1856, he moved to San Diego, California to manage his half-brother's ranch. In 1865, Williston was awarded a B.S. degree in the Norwich Class of 1856 based on the combination of his education and his military service. He was also initiated as an honorary member of Theta Chi fraternity at the school.

On August 5, 1861, Williston was commissioned in the 2nd United States Artillery as a second lieutenant in San Francisco, California. Later that year, on September 27, he was promoted to first lieutenant. On June 12, 1864, Williston received the Medal of Honor for his actions at Trevilian Station, Virginia as part of Battery D, 2nd United States Artillery, as part of the famed U.S. Horse Artillery Brigade. The medal citation is for his "distinguished gallantry in action at Trevillian Station, Virginia, June 2, 1864."

Effective March 8, 1865, Williston promoted to captain. He was brevetted captain on May 3, 1863, for "gallant and meritorious services in action at Salem Heights, Virginia" and brevetted Major for the same at the Battle of Gettysburg on July 3, 1863. He was brevetted Lieutenant Colonel on September 19, 1864 in the Battle of Winchester and brevetted Colonel on March 13, 1865.

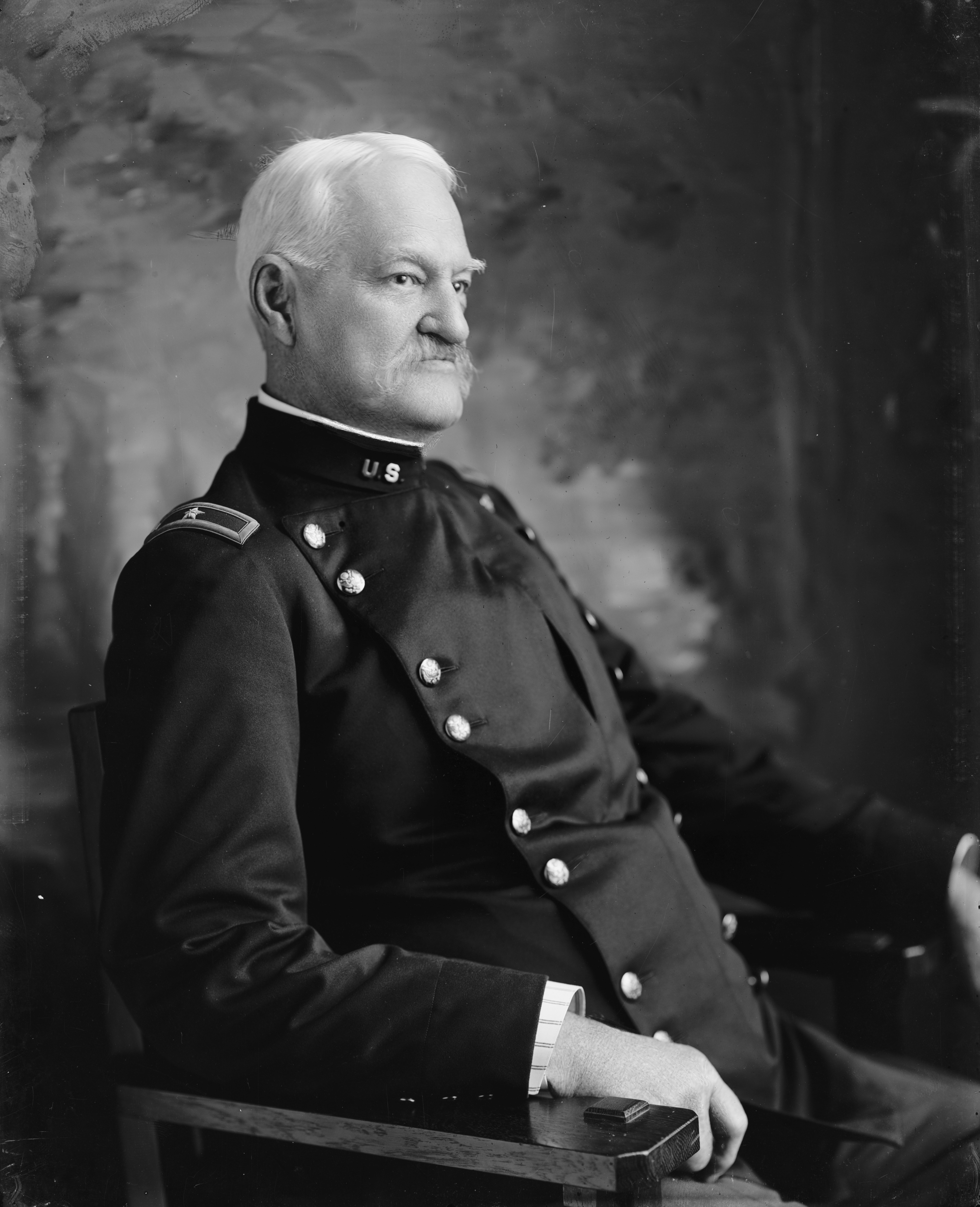
Brigadier General Edward Williston

However it was not until March 22, 1885, before Williston was permanently promoted to major in the 3rd U.S. Artillery, reaching lieutenant colonel ten years later on February 12, 1895. He reached full colonel in the 6th U.S. Artillery on March 8, 1898.

During the Spanish–American War, Williston was promoted to brigadier general of volunteers on March 4, 1898; he was discharged from the volunteers on June 12, 1899, and reverted to his permanent rank of colonel. He retired on July 15, 1900; by an act of Congress, he was promoted to brigadier general on the retired list on April 23, 1904.

Williston was a companion of the California Commandery of the Military Order of the Loyal Legion of the United States.

Married to Flora E. Chatfield Williston (1861–1944), Williston retired to Portland, Oregon. They had a winter home in San Diego, California, where he died on April 24, 1920. He was buried at Arlington National Cemetery, with his wife being buried next to him twenty-four years later.

== Medal of Honor citation ==
Rank and organization: First Lieutenant, 2d U.S. Artillery. Place and date: At Trevilian Station, Va., June 12, 1864. Entered service at: San Francisco, Calif. Birth: Norwich, Vt. Date of issue: April 6, 1892.

Citation:

Distinguished gallantry.

== See also ==
- List of Medal of Honor recipients
- List of American Civil War Medal of Honor recipients: T–Z
