= Fort Cronkhite =

Fort in Sausalito, California, US

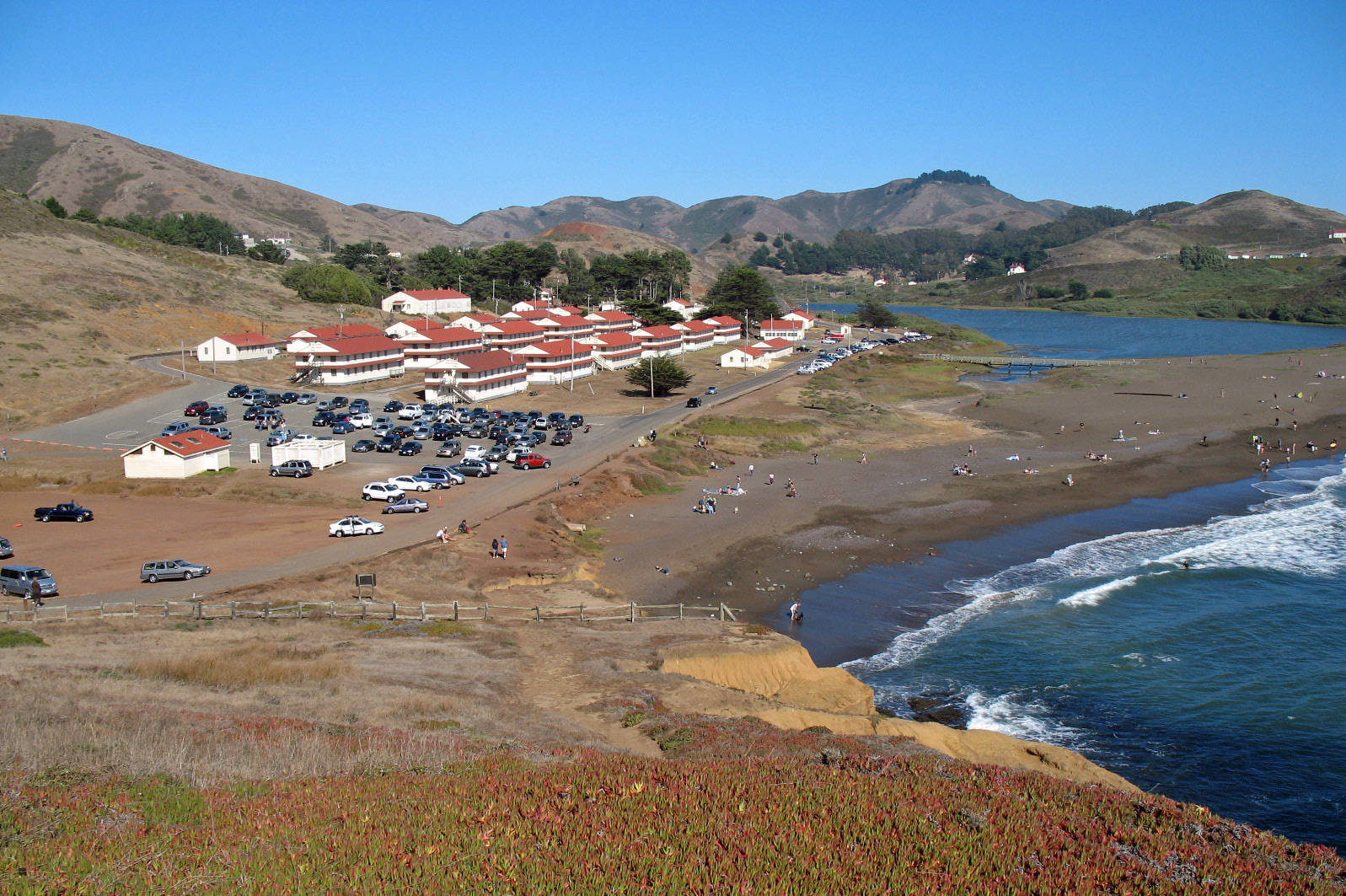
- Fort Cronkhite in the Marin Headlands in Sausalito, CA. 2012

- Location within San Francisco Bay Area Location within California Location within the United States
- Location: Sausalito, California, United States
- Coordinates: 37°49′56″N 122°32′07″W
- Operator: National Park Service
- Website: Official website
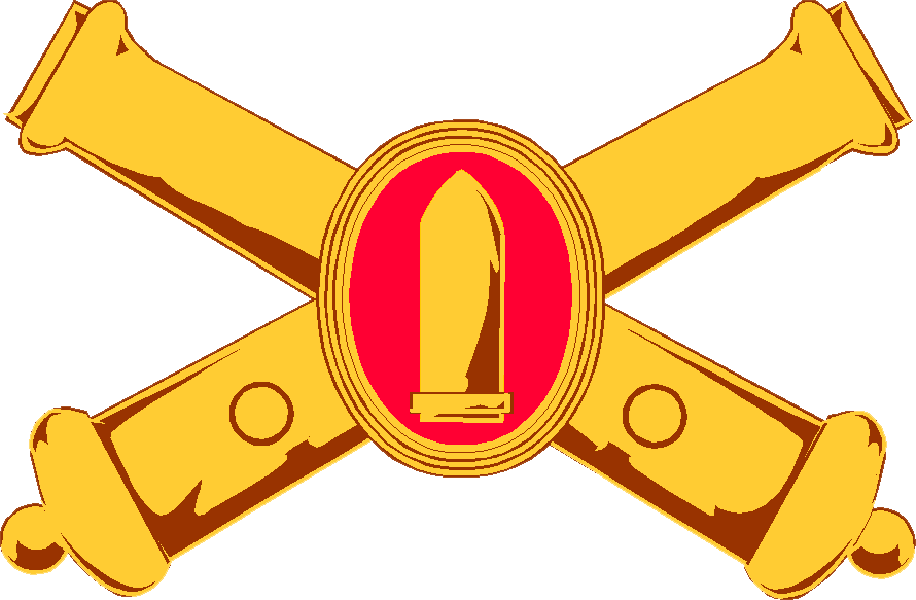
- Fort Cronkhite
- Sausalito, California, US
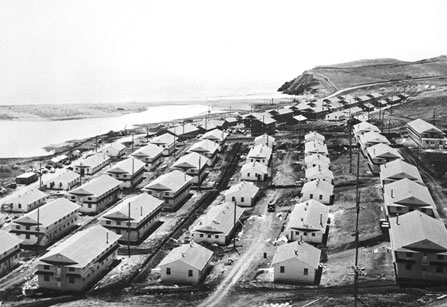
- Fort Cronkhite soon after completion, 1941.

Site information
- Type: Military defense; military post
- Owner: United States Army
- Controlled by: 6th Air Defense Artillery Regiment
- Open to the public: Yes

Site history
- Built: 1930
- Fate: Decommission 1974

Fort Cronkhite is one of the components of California's Golden Gate National Recreation Area. Today part of the National Park Service, Fort Cronkhite is a former US Army post that served as part of the coastal artillery defenses of the San Francisco Bay Area during World War II. The soldiers at Cronkhite manned gun batteries, radar sites, and other fortifications on the high ridges overlooking the fort.

== History ==
Named for former U.S. Army Major General Adelbert Cronkhite, Fort Cronkhite was established in the late 1930s. With the rapid military buildup of the United States in the early 1940s, tens of thousands of temporary wooden structures had to be built by the army to house its growing ranks. The army's Quartermaster Corps and the Corps of Engineers were put in charge of the building projects around the country. Using standard plans, all types of buildings could be built in short time including barracks, mess halls, supply depots, chapels, and recreation buildings. Many of these types of "temporary" wooden building can still be found at Fort Cronkhite today over 70 years later. The first unit to move into the fort was Battery E of the 6th Coast Artillery in June 1941. The soldiers stationed at the fort manned local artillery emplacements as well as the three gun, 3 inch Antiaircraft Battery No. 1.

=== Battery Townsley ===
Named for Major General Clarence P. Townsley, who had commanded the 30th Infantry Division in France in World War I, construction of Battery Townsley began in 1938 with the excavation for the large magazine and gun emplacement on the ridge overlooking what would become Fort Cronkhite. When it was completed in 1940 and transferred to the Coast Artillery Corps it was the second 16-inch battery on the West Coast, after Battery Davis at Fort Funston. The battery was manned at all times with the men on each shift living in the concrete walls of the battery high on the ridge. Battery Townsley is open to the public every first Sunday of the month, from 12 noon to 4 PM.

=== Post War ===
During the Cold War Fort Cronkhite was used to house soldiers of the nearby SF-88 Nike Missile launch site. SF-88 operated throughout the 1960s and early 1970s until it was permanently closed in 1974. Many of the older wooden buildings of the fort had already started to be torn down by the army in the previous years and with the closure of SF-88 Fort Cronkhite was closed altogether soon after.

=== Decommissioning ===
Fort Cronkhite was discontinued as a United States Army installation effective 10 September 1974 by General order Number 25.

== Park Service use ==
Fort Cronkhite is now part of the National Park Service's Marin Headlands section within the Golden Gate National Recreation Area. Along with nearby Fort Baker and Fort Barry, Fort Cronkhite is on the National Register of Historic Places. Visitors to Fort Cronkhite can take walking tours of the former army buildings and hike the many trails located in the area. Many of these buildings are occupied by private non-profit organizations and are not open to the public. Rodeo Beach, which separates Rodeo Lagoon from the Pacific Ocean is located near Fort Cronkhite and is open to the public. Rodeo Beach is a popular public surfing location that is close to San Francisco. Camping is also available at campgrounds in the Marin Headlands area. Fort Cronkhite is also the location of the Golden Gate region of the National Park partner NatureBridge, an environmental and outdoor education organization for youth.

== Gallery ==
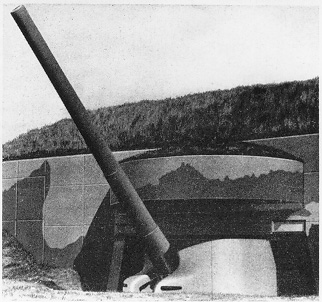
16-inch casemated gun, similar to those at Battery Townsley.

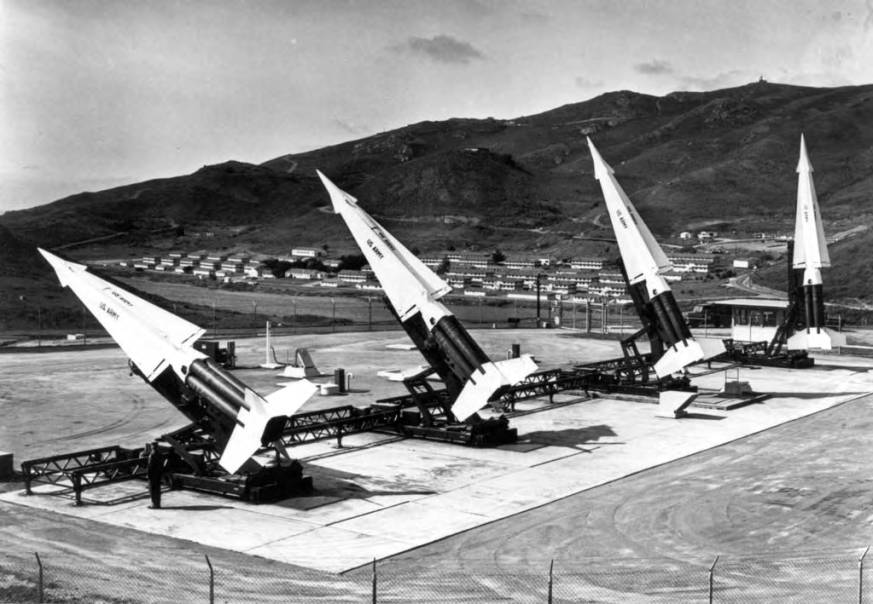
SF-88 Nike Missiles with Fort Cronkhite visible, circa 1959.

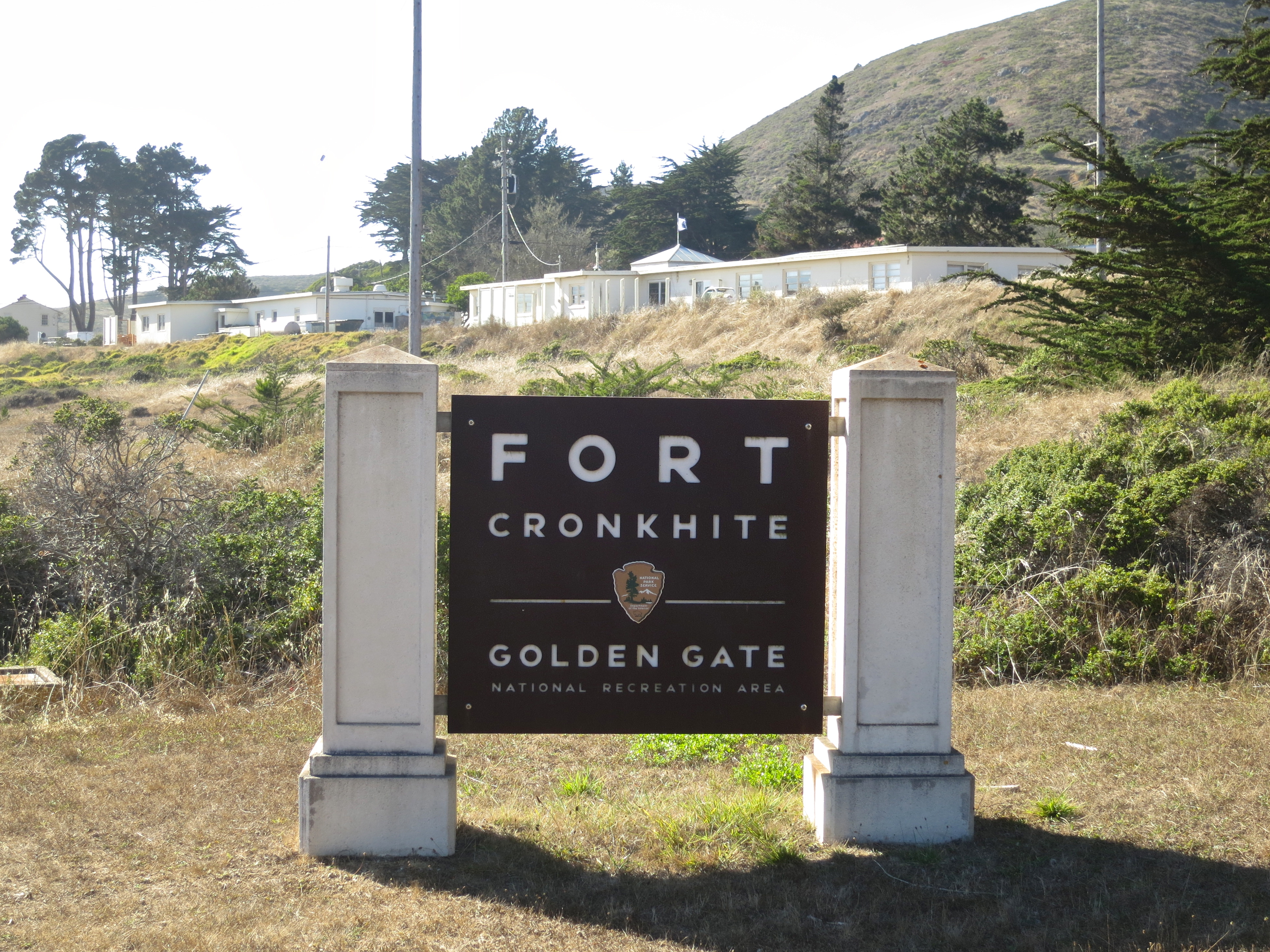

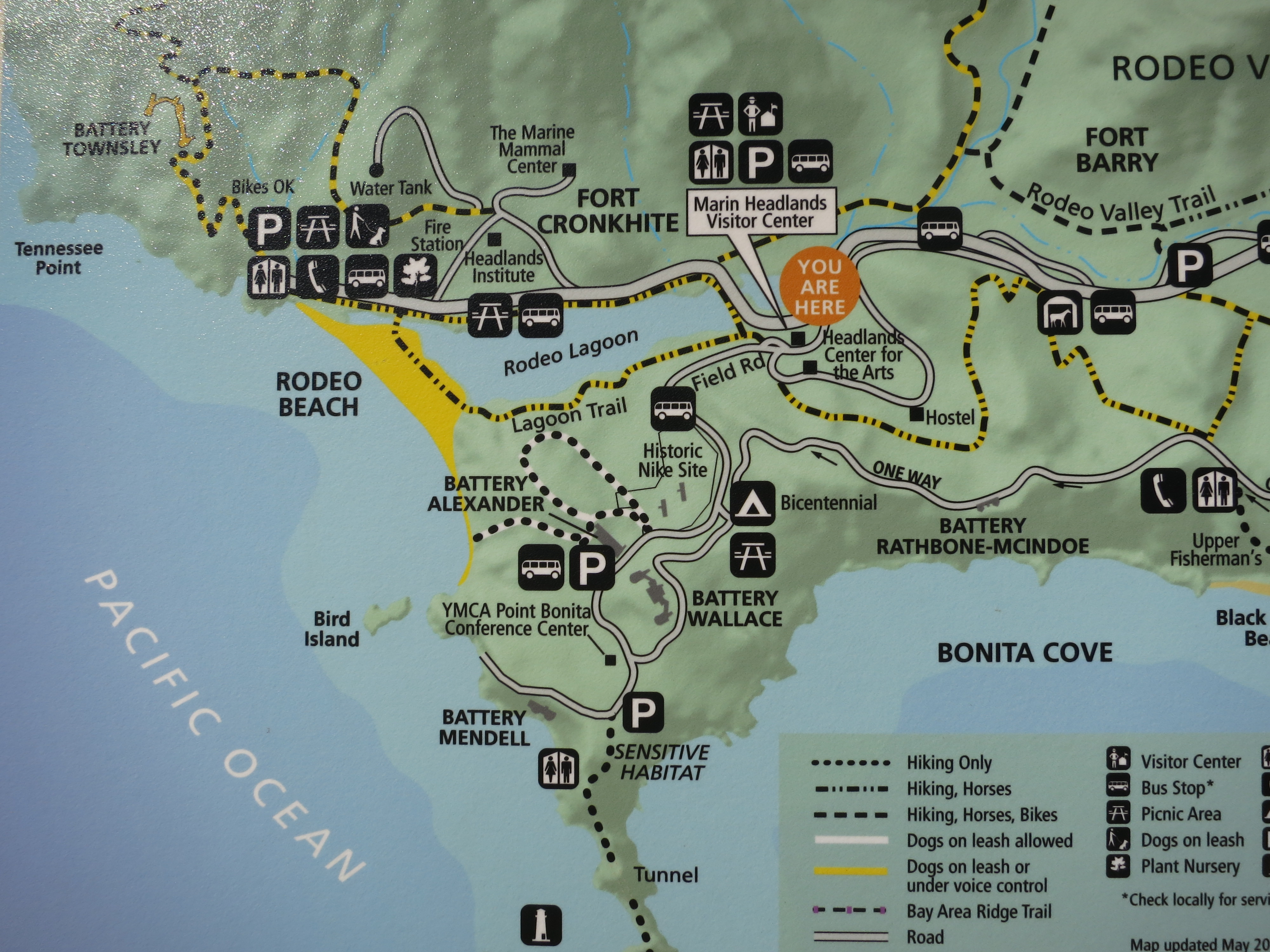
Map of the Fort Cronkhite Area

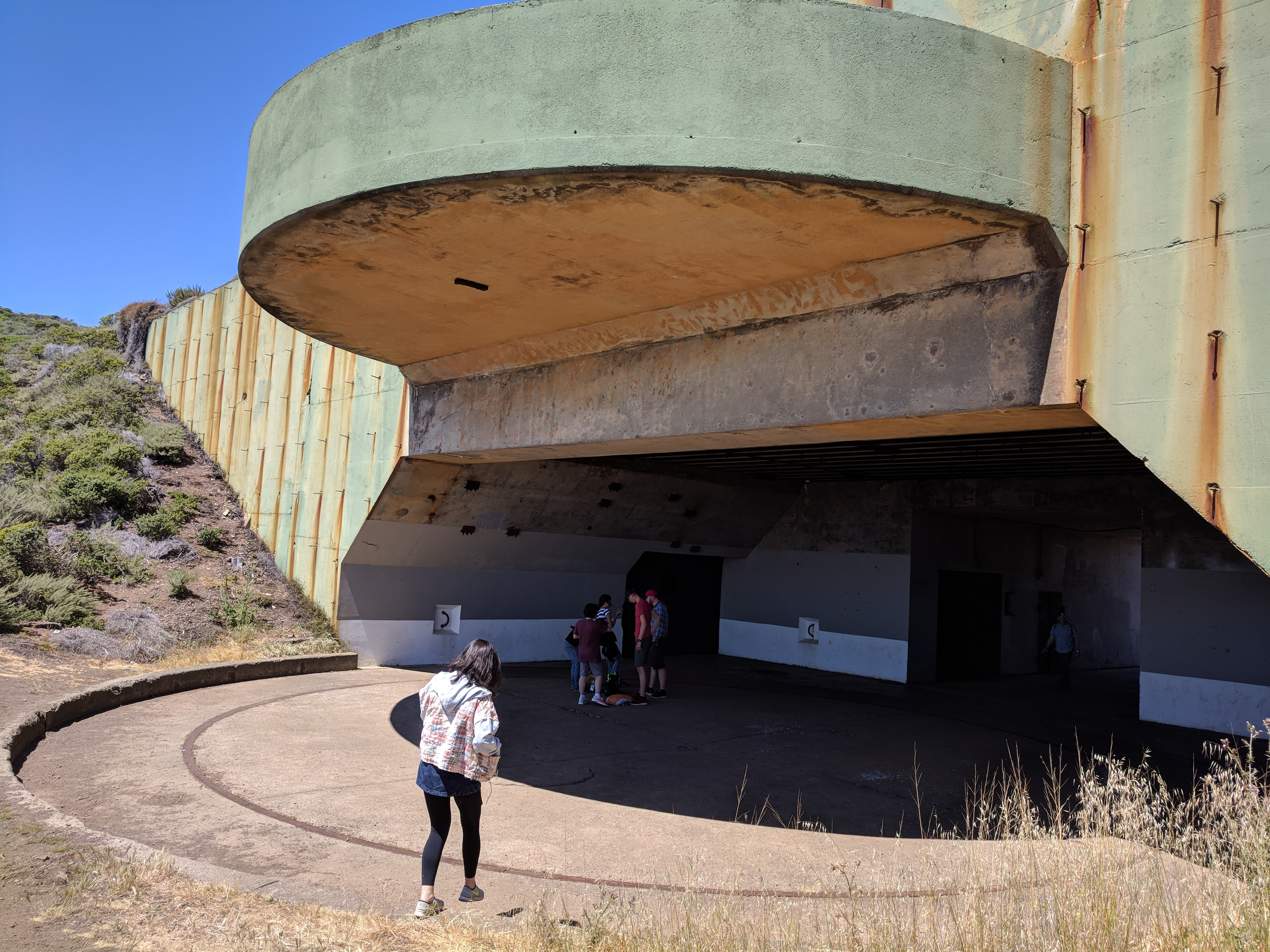
Battery Townsley
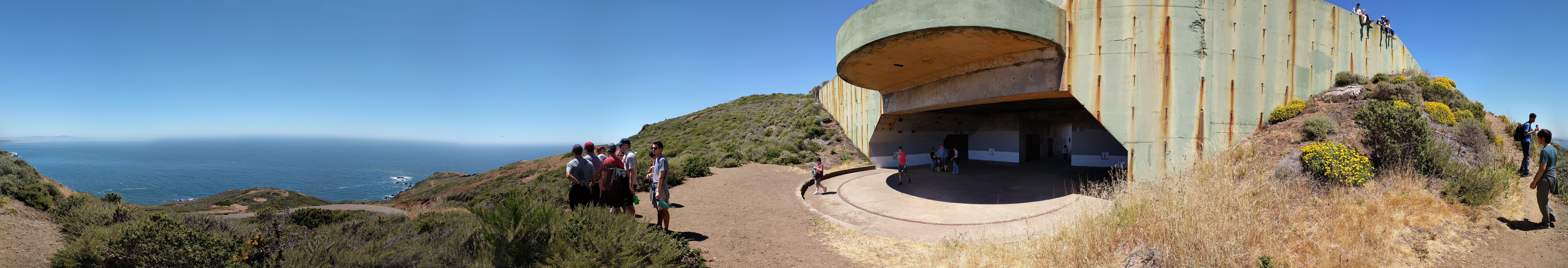
Panorama of Battery Townsley

== See also ==
- Golden Gate National Recreation Area
- Marin Headlands
- San Francisco Bay Area
- Seacoast defense in the United States
