= Archibald H. Sunderland =

United States Army general (1876–1963)

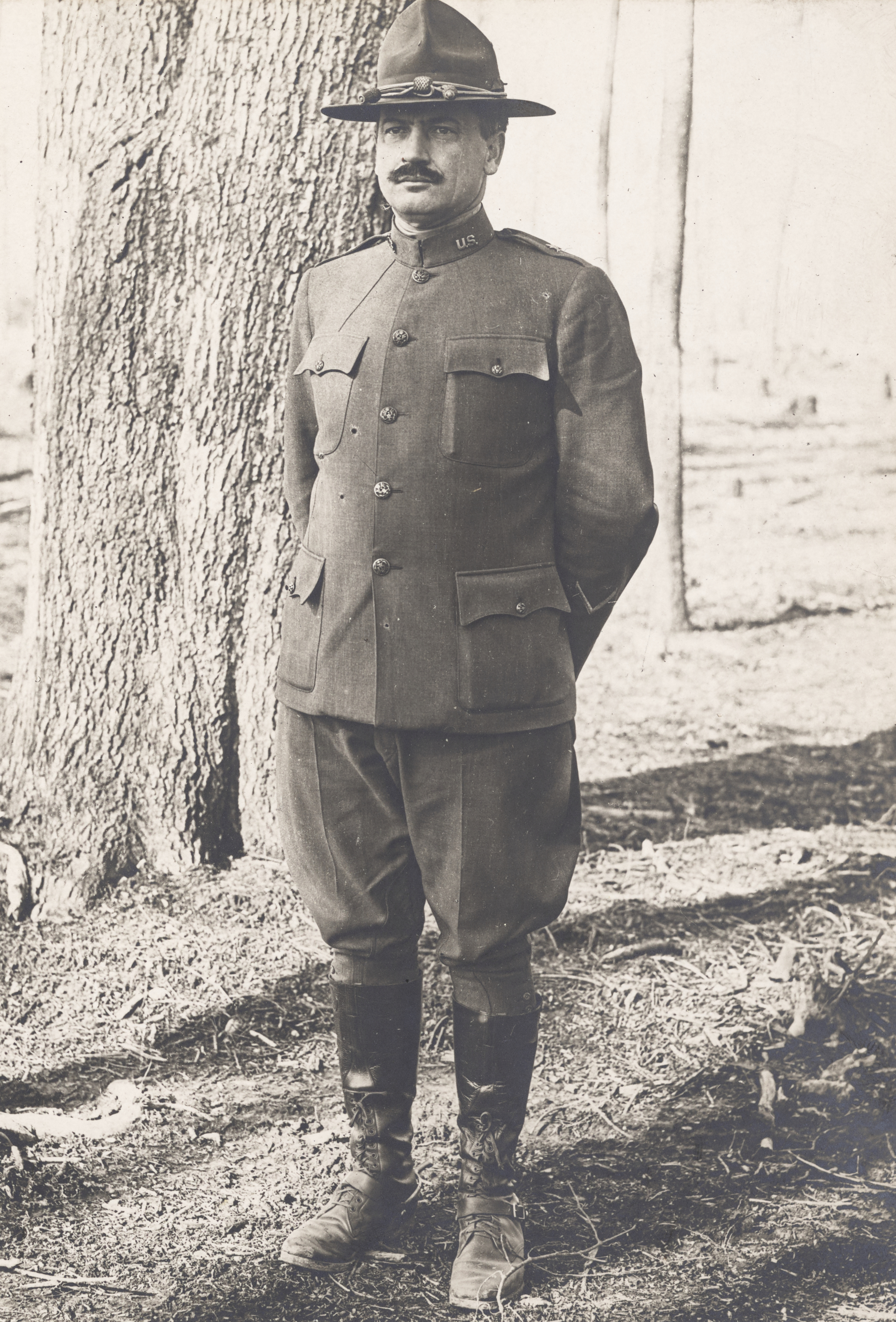
- Sunderland at Camp Eustis, Virginia c. 1919
- Born: December 2, 1876; Delavan, Illinois, United States
- Died: October 31, 1963 (aged 86); Hampton, Virginia, United States
- Burial place: Arlington National Cemetery, Virginia, United States
- Spouse: Rosaline Morton Brand (m. 1910–1960, her death)
- Children: 3
- Military career
- Allegiance: United States
- Branch: United States Army
- Service years: 1900–1940
- Rank: Major General
- Service number: 0-1102
- Unit: Coast Artillery Corps
- Commands: 25th Field Artillery Battery; Fort Ward; 49th Coast Artillery Company; 166th Coast Artillery Company; 1st Battalion, 8th Provisional Coast Artillery Regiment; 1st Battalion, 53rd Heavy Artillery Regiment; Heavy Artillery School, American Expeditionary Forces; Coast Artillery Training Camp; Coast Artillery School; 41st Field Artillery Brigade; Fort Eustis; 51st Coast Artillery Regiment; 14th Coast Artillery Regiment; Coast Artillery Board; Chief of Coast Artillery
- Conflicts: Philippine–American War; World War I
- Awards: Army Distinguished Service Medal

Signature
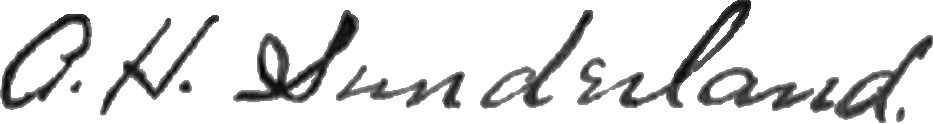

Archibald Henry Sunderland (December 2, 1876 – October 31, 1963) was a career officer in the United States Army. A veteran of the Philippine–American War and World War I, he attained the rank of major general and was most notable for his service as the Army's Chief of Coast Artillery from 1936 to 1940, after which he retired from the military.

== Early life ==
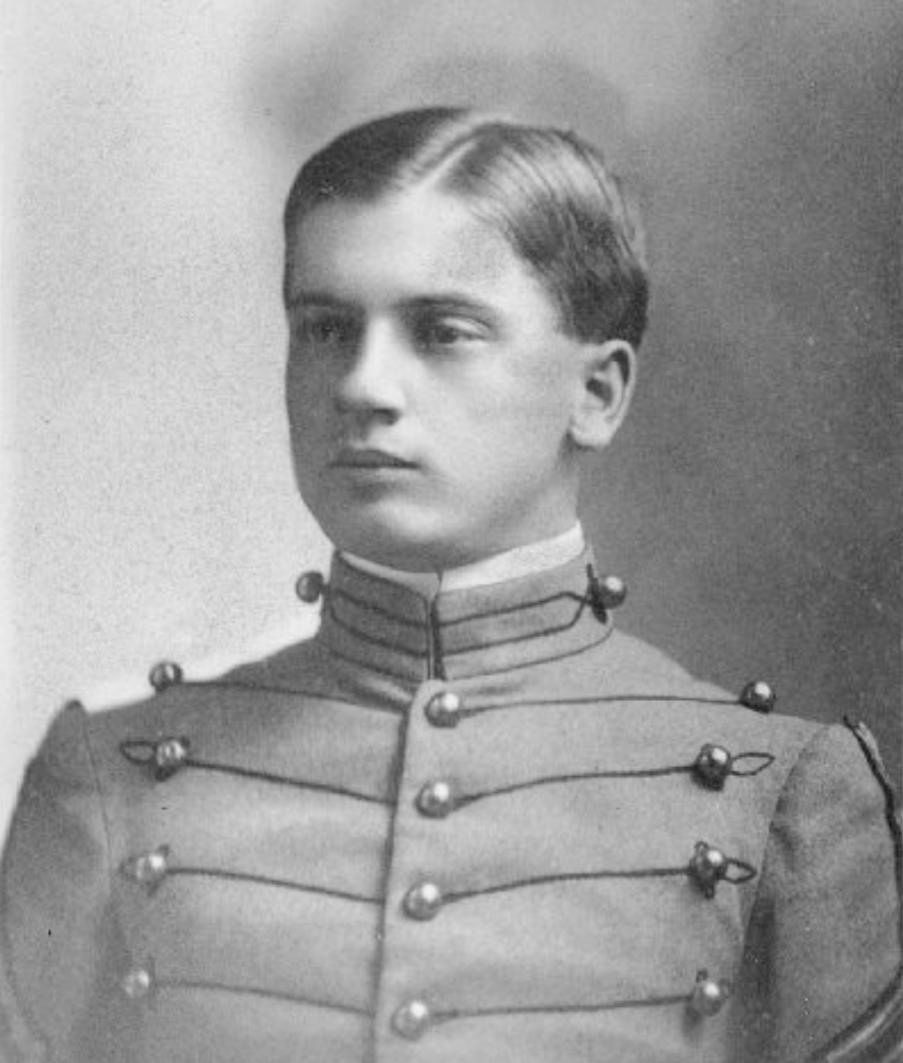
At West Point in 1900

Archibald Henry Sunderland was born on his family's farm near Delavan, Illinois on December 2, 1876, the son of Edward and Jennie (Adams) Sunderland. He attended the public schools of Delavan and graduated from Delavan High School in 1894. He attended the University of Illinois for two years.

In 1896, he began attendance at the United States Military Academy. Sunderland graduated in 1900 ranked 24th of 54. He was commissioned as a second lieutenant of Field Artillery and assigned to the 6th Artillery Regiment.

== Start of career ==
Sunderland was initially assigned to Columbus Barracks, Ohio. In July 1901 he was promoted to first lieutenant, and in October he was assigned to duty in the Philippines during the Philippine–American War. He served with a mountain battery on Mindanao and took part in several engagements against Filipino insurgents near Lake Lanao. After returning to the United States in 1903, Sunderland commanded the 25th Field Artillery Battery at Fort Riley, Kansas.

From 1904 to 1908, Sunderland served on the West Point faculty as an instructor in mathematics. In January 1907, he received promotion to captain. When Field Artillery and Coast Artillery became separate branches later in 1907, Sunderland was assigned to the Coast Artillery. From 1908 to 1911, he commanded the post at Fort Ward, Washington. He attended the Coast Artillery Officers' Course at the Fort Monroe, Virginia Artillery School from 1911 to 1913, afterwards remaining at the school to serve on its faculty. From 1913 to 1914, Sunderland served on the staff of the Chief of Coast Artillery.

== World War I ==
World War I started in July 1914, and in August Sunderland was to participate in the American Relief Expedition. After traveling to the Netherlands aboard USS Tennessee, in late 1914 and early 1915 he took part in the evacuation of American citizens from The Hague. From February to September 1915, he served as US military attaché at the U.S. embassy in The Hague.

From September to November 1915, Sunderland commanded the 49th Coast Artillery Company at Fort Williams, Maine. From November 1915 to May 1917, he commanded the 166th Coast Artillery Company at Fort Monroe. While in command of his company, Sunderland also commanded Citizens' Military Training Camps at locations including Fort Oglethorpe (Georgia), Tobyhanna Army Depot (Pennsylvania), and Plattsburgh Barracks (New York). In June 1917, shortly after the American entry into World War I, he received a promotion to major.

In July 1917, Sunderland assumed command of 1st Battalion, 8th Provisional Coast Artillery Regiment, which he organized and trained at Fort Monroe, Fort Adams (Rhode Island), and Mailly-le-Camp, France. Upon arrival in France, the regiment was reorganized with the 53rd Heavy Artillery Regiment, and Sunderland commanded his battalion until October 1917. From October 1917 to January 1918, he was an instructor at and then director of the Heavy Artillery School created to provide training to units of the American Expeditionary Forces (AEF).

Sunderland was promoted to temporary lieutenant colonel in January 1918 and returned to Fort Monroe to command the Coast Artillery Training Camp and serve as director of the Coast Artillery School. In July 1918, he received another promotion, this time to temporary colonel. From August to October 1918, Sunderland was a senior instructor at the Coast Artillery School.

In October 1918, Sunderland was promoted to temporary brigadier general and assigned to command the 41st Field Artillery Brigade at Fort Monroe. He remained in this position through the end of the war, and received the Army Distinguished Service Medal in recognition of the superior service he rendered during the conflict. The citation for the medal reads:

The President of the United States of America, authorized by Act of Congress, July 9, 1918, takes pleasure in presenting the Army Distinguished Service Medal to Brigadier General Archibald Henry Sunderland, United States Army, for exceptionally meritorious and distinguished services to the Government of the United States, in a duty of great responsibility during World War I. As Commandant of the Coast Artillery School and in the reorganization and administration of that institution, General Sunderland thereby enabled it to meet effectively the demands made upon it for training candidates for commissions in the Coast Artillery Corps.

== Later career ==
In December 1918, Sunderland was assigned to command the post at Fort Eustis, Virginia, and he remained in this position until July 1919. In 1919, he returned to his permanent rank of major and was selected to attend the United States Army Command and General Staff College. After graduating in 1920, Sunderland began attendance at the United States Army War College. Following his 1921 graduation, he was promoted to permanent lieutenant colonel and ordered to duty with the Army General Staff. In 1922, he was assigned to staff duty in the Philippines. While carrying out this assignment, Sunderland participated in the relief expedition that responded to the 1923 Great Kantō earthquake.

Upon his return to the United States in 1924, Sunderland was again posted to Fort Monroe as an instructor, a duty which also included command of annual Reserve Officers' Training Corps encampments at the post. From September 1928 to May 1929, Sunderland commanded the 51st Coast Artillery Regiment at Fort Eustis with the rank of colonel. From May 1929 to July 1930, he commanded the 14th Coast Artillery Regiment at Fort Worden, Washington. From 1930 to 1932, Sunderland served with the Hawaiian Department, first as assistant chief of staff for logistics (G-4), then as chief of staff of the Hawaiian Division. From 1932 to 1936, he was president of the Coast Artillery Board, a panel created to review and make recommendations on doctrine and equipment.

In 1936, Sunderland was assigned as Chief of Coast Artillery with the temporary rank of major general. In this post, Sunderland supervised Coast Artillery construction, training, and weapons procurement as the Army expanded in anticipation of entry into World War II. Sunderland left the military after reaching the mandatory retirement age of 64 in 1940 and was succeeded by Joseph A. Green.

== Retirement and death ==
In retirement, Sunderland resided in Hampton, Virginia. He died at the age of 86 at the U.S. Naval Hospital in Annapolis, Maryland on October 31, 1963. Sunderland was buried at Arlington National Cemetery.

== Family ==
In 1910, Sunderland married Rosaline Morton Brand (1885–1960). They were the parents of sons Morton (1911–2004), an officer in the United States Navy, and Richard (1918–1941), a radio operator for Pennsylvania Central Airlines, and daughter Jane (1915–2001), the wife of Army officer Harold Broudy.
