= 6th Air Defense Artillery Regiment =

6th Air Defense Artillery
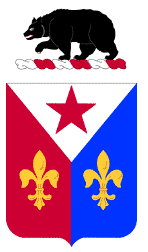
- Coat of arms
- Active: 1898–present
- Country: United States
- Branch: Army
- Type: Air defense artillery
- Motto: "Certo Dirigo Ictu" (I Aim With a Sure Blow)
- Engagements: Philippine–American War; World War II; Vietnam War
- Decorations: Meritorious Unit Commendation with oak leaf cluster Philippine Republic Presidential Unit Citation

Commanders
- Notable commanders: Edward B. Williston

Insignia
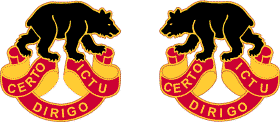
- Distinctive unit insignia

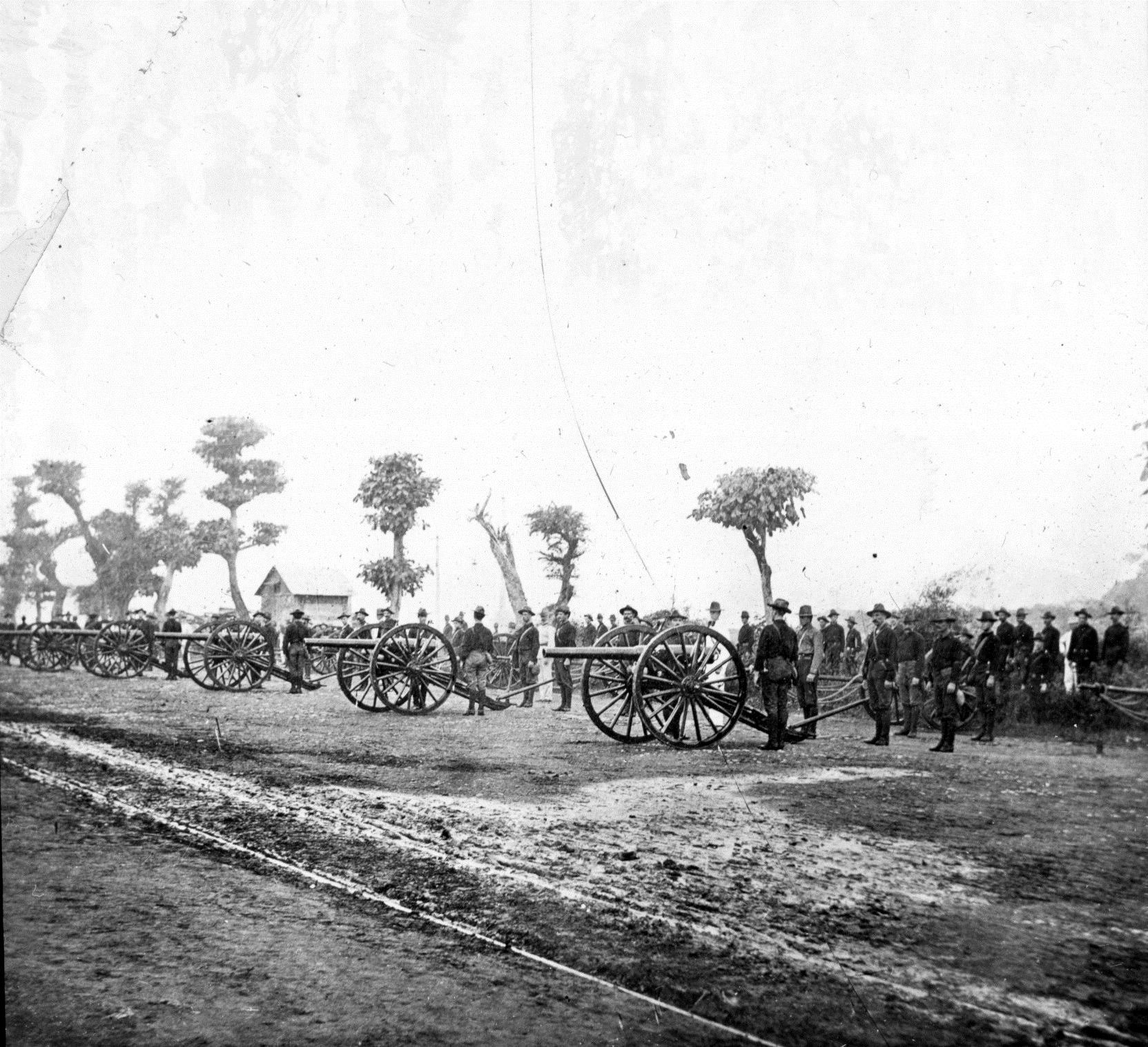
3.2-inch guns of the 6th Artillery in the Spanish–American War.

The 6th Air Defense Artillery Regiment is an air defense artillery regiment in the United States Army, first formed in 1898 as the 6th Regiment of Artillery. The 6th and 7th U.S. Artillery Regiments were constituted on 8 March 1898, three weeks after the explosion of the USS Maine in Havana, Cuba on 15 February 1898, as the United States' declaration of war on Spain and commencement of the Spanish–American War seemed imminent.

== Lineage ==
Constituted 8 March 1898 in the Regular Army as the "6th Regiment of Artillery". Organized 23 March 1898 at Fort McHenry, Maryland. Colonel Edward B. Williston, a Medal of Honor recipient for actions in the Civil War, was the regiment's first commander.

Order of battle information indicates that the regiment did not deploy outside the U.S. in the Spanish–American War of 1898. However, the regiment has battle honors for the Philippine Insurrection (a.k.a. Philippine–American War) that closely followed it.

- The regiment was broken up 13 February 1901 and its elements reorganized and redesignated as separate numbered companies and batteries of the Artillery Corps.
- Reconstituted 1 July 1924 in the Regular Army as the 6th Coast Artillery and partially organized with headquarters at Fort Winfield Scott, California. The regiment was organized by redesignating the 71st, 60th, 61st, 62nd, 63rd, 64th, 65th, 66th, 67th, 68th, & 69th Cos of the Coast Artillery Corps (CAC). Batteries A, B, C, E, F, H, I, and K carried the lineage and designations of the corresponding batteries in the old 6th Artillery. The regiment garrisoned portions of the Harbor Defenses of San Francisco. Headquarters and headquarters battery (HHB) and Batteries A, E, and K were the only components initially activated. HHB and Batteries A and E at Fort Winfield Scott, Battery K at Fort Baker.
- Battery K inactivated 30 September 1930.
- HHB 1st, and 2nd activated 1 July 1939 at Fort Winfield Scott, California; HHB 4th Battalion activated 15 January 1941 at Fort Funston, California.
- HHB 1st Battalion moved to Fort Barry 10 April 1942 until 16 November 1942, then to Fort Winfield Scott until 15 September 1945.
- HHB 2nd Battalion moved to Fort Baker 11 July 1939 until 31 August 1942. Moved to Fort Cronkhite 1 September 1942 until 15 September 1945.
- HHB 3rd Battalion activated at Fort Winfield Scott 2 June 1941 until 6 December 1941 when moved to Fort Miley until 15 September 1945.
- HHB 4th Battalion activated at Fort Funston 15 January 1941, moved to Fort Baker 19 January 1941, to Fort Barry 20 June 1941, to Fort Miley 27 January 1944.
- Batteries B and C activated at Fort Winfield Scott 1 July 1939. Battery C moved to Fort Miley 12 January 1942 until inactivated 10 September 1942. Battery D activated at Fort Barry 15 January 1941. Battery E posted at Fort Winfield Scott to 11 July 1939, moved to Fort Barry 15 January 1941, to Fort Cronkhite 6 June 1941 until 15 September 1945. Battery F activated at Fort Baker 1 August 40 and remained there until 10 June 1946.
- Battery G activated at Fort Cronkhite, moved to Fort Barry 10 April 1942 and redesignated Battery A, 6th Coast Artillery (HD) Battalion 18 October 1944. Battery H activated at Fort Baker 2 June 1941, moved to Fort Barry 4 October 1941 until redesignated Battery A, 172nd CA (HD) Battalion 18 October 1944. Battery I activated at Fort Baker 2 June 1941, moved to Fort Barry 22 June 1941 until redesignated Battery B, 172nd CA (HD) Battalion 18 October 1944.
- Battery K reactivated at Fort Baker 1 January 1931, moved to Fort Barry 12 March 1941 until inactivated 18 October 1944. Battery L activated at Fort Baker 15 January 1941, moved to Fort Barry 1 August 1941, moved to Camp Barkeley, Texas where inactivated 8 May 1944. Battery M activated at Fort Baker 15 January 1941, moved to Fort Barry 4 June 1941, to Fort Baker 6 October 1941, to Fort Barry 10 April 1942, to Fort Baker 4 November 1942, to Camp Barkeley, Texas where inactivated 8 May 1944. Battery N (Searchlight) activated at Fort Winfield Scott 15 January 1941 until 10 June 1946. Battery O activated at Ft. Miley 12 January 1942 and inactivated 10 September 1942.
- Regiment broken up 18 October 1944 and its elements reorganized and redesignated as follows: Headquarters and Headquarters Battery disbanded, 1st–4th Battalions reorganized and redesignated as the 6th, 172nd, 173rd, and 174th Coast Artillery Battalions, respectively.
- After 18 October 1944, the above units underwent changes as follows: Headquarters and Headquarters Battery (HHB), 6th Coast Artillery, reconstituted 28 June 1950 in the Regular Army concurrently consolidated with HHB, 6th Antiaircraft Artillery Group, (see Annex 1) and consolidated unit designated as Headquarters Battery, 6th Artillery Group. Activated 1 February 1952 at Fort Bliss, Texas. Redesignated 20 March 1958 as Headquarters and Headquarters Battery, 6th Artillery Group. Inactivated 1 September 1971 at Fort Bliss, Texas.
- 6th Coast Artillery Battalion disbanded 15 September 1945 in California. Reconstituted 28 June 1950 in the Regular Army and redesignated as the 6th Antiaircraft Artillery Battalion. Redesignated 4 October 1950 as the 6th Antiaircraft Artillery Automatic Weapons Battalion, assigned to the 6th Infantry Division, and activated at Fort Ord, California. Inactivated 3 April 1956 to Fort Ord, California, and relieved from assignment to the 6th Infantry Division.
- The 172nd Coast Artillery Battalion disbanded 15 September 1945 in California. Reconstituted 28 June 1950 in the Regular Army; concurrently consolidated with the 25th Antiaircraft Artillery Automatic Weapons Battalion (active) (see Annex 2), and consolidated unit designated as the 25th Antiaircraft Artillery Automatic Weapons Battalion, an element of the 25th Infantry Division. Inactivated 10 November 1951 in Korea and relieved from assignment to the 25th Infantry Division. Redesignated 19 November 1952 as the 25th Antiaircraft Artillery Gun Battalion. Activated 1 February 1953 in Germany. Redesignated 1 October 1953 as the 25th Antiaircraft Artillery Battalion. Redesignated 5 December 1957 as the 25th Antiaircraft Artillery Missile Battalion. Inactivated 1 September 1958 in Germany.
- The 173rd Coast Artillery Battalion disbanded 15 September 1945 at Fort Miley, California. Reconstituted 28 June 1950 in the Regular Army and redesignated as the 45th Antiaircraft Artillery Battalion. Redesignated 9 March 1951 as the 45th Antiaircraft Artillery Gun Battalion. Activated 19 March 1951 at Fort Bliss, Texas. Redesignated 1 October 1953 as the 45th Antiaircraft Artillery Missile Battalion. Inactivated 1 September 1958 in Germany.
- The 174th Coast Artillery Battalion disbanded 15 September 1945 in California. Reconstituted 28 June 1950 in the Regular Army and redesignated as the 53rd Antiaircraft Artillery Battalion. Redesignated 21 April 1952 as the 53rd Antiaircraft Artillery Gun Battalion. Activated 5 May 1952 in Japan. Inactivated 24 June 1955 in Japan. Redesignated 6 October 1955 as the 53rd Antiaircraft Artillery Battalion. Activated 15 November 1955 at Fort Bliss, Texas. Inactivated 25 March 1957 at Fort Bliss, Texas.
- The 6th Antiaircraft Artillery Automatic Weapons Battalion; 25th and 45th Antiaircraft Artillery Missile Battalions; 53rd Antiaircraft Artillery Battalion; and 6th Armored Field Artillery Battalion (organized 1907) consolidated, reorganized and redesignated 1 September 1963 as the 6th Artillery, a parent regiment under the Combat Arms Regimental System.
- The 6th Artillery (less former 6th Armored Field Artillery Battalion) consolidated 1 September 1971 with Headquarters and Headquarters Battery, 6th Artillery Group, and consolidated unit reorganized and redesignated as the 6th Air Defense Artillery, a parent regiment under the Combat Arms Regimental System (former 6th Armored Field Artillery Battalion concurrently reorganized and redesignated as the 6th Field Artillery – hereafter separate lineage).
- Withdrawn 16 June 1987 from the Combat Arms Regimental System, reorganized under the United States Army Regimental System and transferred to the United States Army Training and Doctrine Command with headquarters at Fort Bliss, Texas. Re-aligned under the Fires Center of Excellence at Fort Sill, Oklahoma in 2009.

=== Annex 1 (6th AAA Group) ===
Constituted 5 August 1942 in the Army of the United States as Headquarters and Headquarters Battery, 6th Antiaircraft Artillery Automatic Weapons Group (or 6th Coast Artillery Group (AA)). Activated 21 August 1942 at Camp Haan, California. Redesignated 26 May 1943 as HHB, 6th Antiaircraft Artillery Group.

Departed the United States 18 August 1943 and arrived in Australia 11 September 1943. Landed in New Guinea 1 November 1943; moved to New Britain 11 May 1944. Returned to New Guinea 7 December 1944; moved to Tacloban, Philippines 1 March 1945 but did not unload; landed in Manila Bay, Philippines 11 March 1945.

Inactivated 10 December 1945 at Manila, Philippine Islands.

=== Annex 2 (778th AAA-AW Battalion) ===
Constituted 8 February 1943 in the Army of the United States as the 778th Coast Artillery Battalion (AA) (Auto-Weapons). Activated 10 March 1943 at Camp Haan, California. Redesignated 1 May 1943 as the 778th Antiaircraft Artillery Automatic Weapons Battalion (Self-Propelled).

Departed New York port of embarkation 14 October 1944; arrived in England 25 October 1944. Served in France and the European Theater of Operations beginning on 19 December 1944. Returned to New York port of embarkation 30 April 1946.

Inactivated l May 1946 at Camp Kilmer, New Jersey. Redesignated 13 October 1948 as the 25th Antiaircraft Artillery Automatic Weapons Battalion and allotted to the Regular Army. Assigned 20 March 1949 to the 25th Infantry Division and activated in Japan.

== Current units ==
- 2nd Battalion, 6th Air Defense Artillery Regiment, 30th Air Defense Artillery Brigade
- 3rd Battalion, 6th Air Defense Artillery Regiment, 30th Air Defense Artillery Brigade

== Honors ==
=== Campaign participation credit ===
Philippine Insurrection: Streamer without inscription

World War II: Rhineland; Ardennes-Alsace; Central Europe; New Guinea; Bismarck Archipelago; Luzon

Vietnam: Defense; Counteroffensive; Counteroffensive, Phase II; Counteroffensive, Phase III; Tet Counteroffensive; Counteroffensive, Phase IV; Counteroffensive, Phase V; Counteroffensive, Phase VI; Tet 69/Counteroffensive; Summer-Fall 1969; Winter-Spring 1970

=== Decorations ===
- Meritorious Unit Commendation, streamer embroidered VIETNAM 1966 (8th Battalion, 6th Artillery, 1968).
- Meritorious Unit Commendation, streamer embroidered VIETNAM 1967–1968 (8th Battalion, 6th Artillery, 1969).
- Philippine Presidential Unit Citation, streamer embroidered 17 OCTOBER 1944 TO 4 JULY 1945 (Headquarters and Headquarters Battery, 6th Antiaircraft Artillery Group, 1950)

== Coat of arms ==
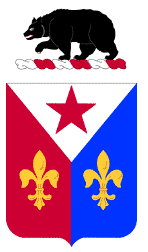
Coat of arms

- Description/Blazon
  - Shield: Parti per pairle argent, gules and azure, in chief a mullet of five points of the second and in fess debased two fleurs-de-lis or.
  - Crest: On a wreath of the colors, argent and gules, a grizzly bear passant sable langued gules.
  - Motto: Certo Dirigo Ictu (I Aim With a Sure Blow)
- Symbolism
  - Shield: The field of the shield, an adaptation of the flag of the Philippine Insurgents, alludes to the regiment's service in the Philippine Insurrection. The scarlet star refers to artillery, its five points indicative of the number of engagements in which a battery of the old 6th Artillery participated during the Insurrection. The two fleurs-de-lis denote service in France during World War I by an element of the regiment.
  - Crest: The crest is taken from that of the Coast Defenses of San Francisco where the old regiment and the majority of its batteries were stationed.
- Background: The coat of arms was originally approved for the 6th Coast Artillery on 3 May 1924. It was redesignated for the 6th Coast Artillery Battalion on 26 February 1945. On 8 March 1951 the coat of arms was redesignated for the 6th Antiaircraft Artillery Automatic Weapons Battalion. It was cancelled on 15 May 1959. On 1 September 1971 the coat for arms was reinstated for the 6th Air Defense Artillery.

== Distinctive unit insignia ==
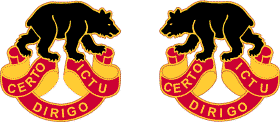
Insignia

The distinctive unit insignia is as follows:

- Description: A black enamel, grizzly bear passant above a stylized red enamel scroll bearing the inscription "CERTO DIRIGO ICTU" in gold letters.
- Symbolism: The design is adapted from the crest of the Coast Defenses of San Francisco where the old regiment and the majority of the companies of same were stationed since 1901 and where the new regiment will be organized and assigned. The motto "CERTO DIRIGO ICTU" (I Aim With a Sure Blow) is indicative of the character of the bear.
- Background : The distinctive unit insignia was originally approved for the 6th Coast Artillery on 20 May 1924. It was redesignated for the 6th Coast Artillery Battalion on 26 February 1945. On 8 March 1951 the insignia was redesignated for the 6th Antiaircraft Artillery Automatic Weapons Battalion. The insignia was cancelled on 15 May 1959. The distinctive unit insignia was reinstated on 1 September 1971 for the 6th Air Defense Artillery.

== See also ==
- Field Artillery Branch (United States)
- Air Defense Artillery Branch (United States)
- U.S. Army Coast Artillery Corps
