= Augustine McIntyre Jr. =

U.S. Army major general

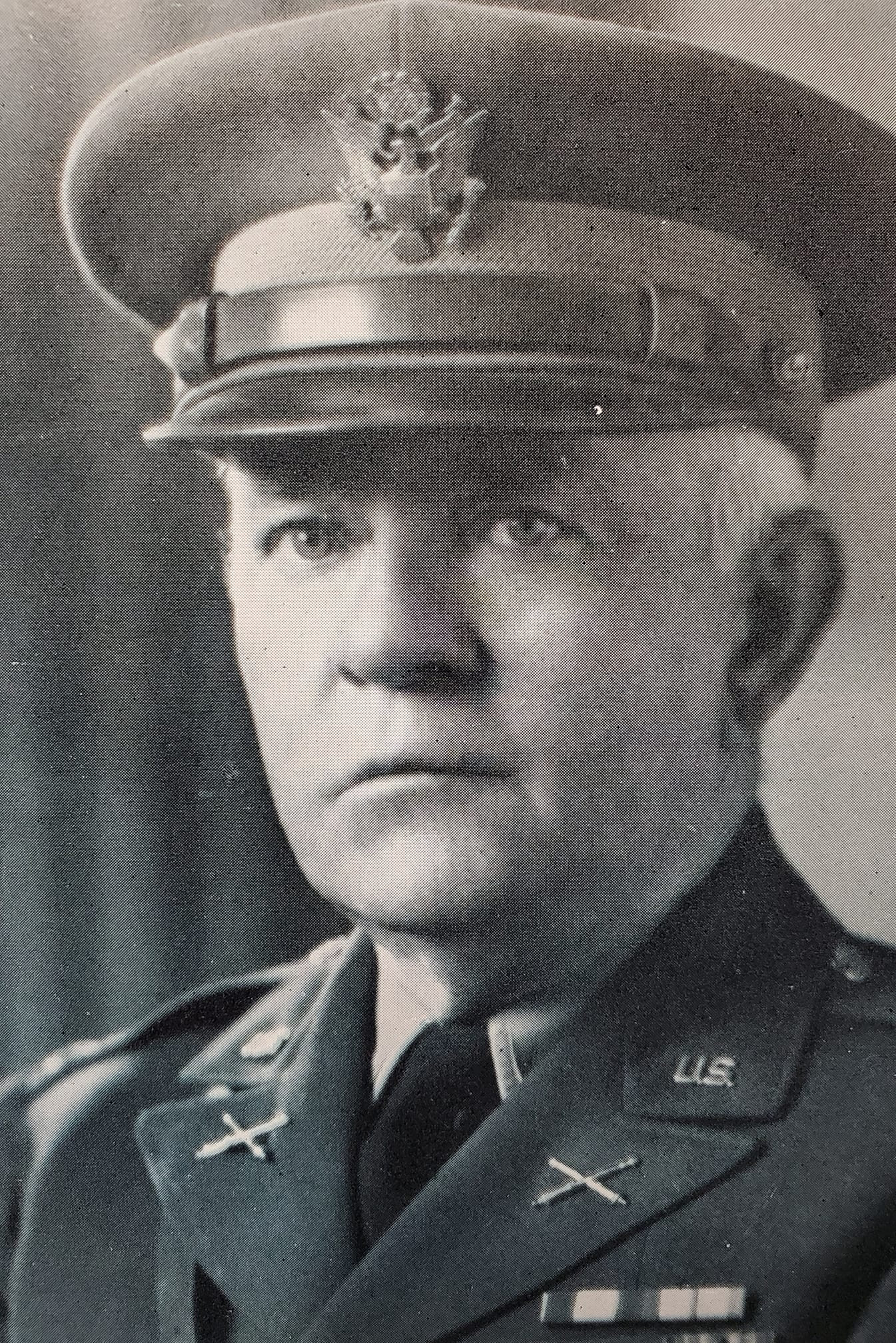
- McIntyre as head of the University of Missouri ROTC program, 1943
- Born: July 19, 1876; Chattanooga, Tennessee
- Died: September 6, 1954 (aged 78); Fort Sam Houston, Texas
- Burial place: Fort Sam Houston National Cemetery
- Spouse: Jane Clemens Swigert (m. 1906; died 1950)
- Military career
- Allegiance: United States
- Branch: United States Army
- Service years: 1900–1940; 1940–1944
- Rank: Major General
- Service number: 0-1118
- Unit: U.S. Army Field Artillery Branch
- Commands: Battery B, 3rd Field Artillery; 326th Field Artillery Regiment; 63rd Field Artillery Brigade; 154th Field Artillery Brigade; 4th Field Artillery Brigade; 1st Field Artillery Brigade; 38th Division; 6th Field Artillery Regiment; 11th Field Artillery Regiment; 13th Field Artillery Regiment; United States Army Field Artillery School; Reserve Officers' Training Corps Program, University of Missouri
- Conflicts: Philippine–American War; World War I World War II
- Awards: Army Distinguished Service Medal

Signature
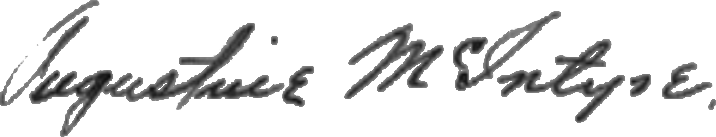

Augustine McIntyre Jr. (July 19, 1876 – September 6, 1954) was a career officer in the United States Army. A member of the Field Artillery branch, he was a veteran of the Philippine–American War, World War I, and World War II. He attained the rank of brigadier general, and was most notable for his command of several artillery brigades during the First World War, and command of the Field Artillery School at the start of the Second World War.

== Early life and education ==
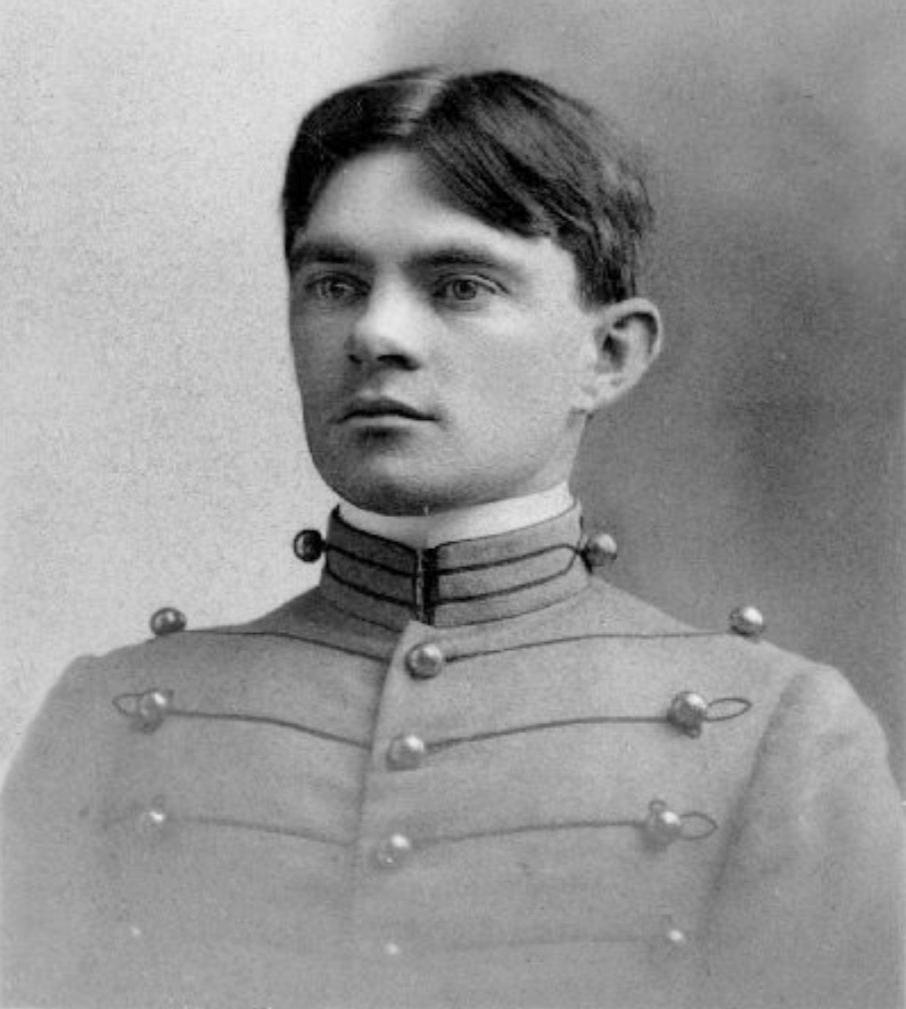
At West Point in 1900

McIntyre was born on July 19, 1876, in Chattanooga, Tennessee. He attended the United States Military Academy, graduating with the class of 1900. McIntyre played baseball on the Army team.

== Career ==
McIntyre received a commission with the cavalry. He transferred to the artillery and served with the 6th Artillery.

McIntyre was promoted to brigadier general on April 15, 1918.

McIntyre commanded the 13th Field Artillery. He then commanded the Field Artillery School at Fort Sill, Oklahoma. He was awarded the Army DSM for his service during World War I. The citation reads:

The President of the United States of America, authorized by Act of Congress, July 9, 1918, takes pleasure in presenting the Army Distinguished Service Medal to Colonel (Field Artillery) Augustine McIntyre, United States Army, for exceptionally meritorious and distinguished service in a position of great responsibility. By his leadership, high professional attainments, and executive ability while serving as President of the Field Artillery Board and as Commander of the Field Artillery School, Colonel McIntyre had made important contributions to the national defense. His thorough tactical and technical knowledge of Field Artillery has forwarded the modernization of field artillery officers of the Army of the United States. Denied by force of circumstances the increased grade appropriate to his position as Commandant of the Field Artillery School, the vigor and efficiency with which he has carried out the exacting and important duties of this assignment afford a fine example of the highest soldierly qualities.

He taught military science and tactics at the University of Missouri.

== Personal life ==
McIntyre married Jane Clemens Swigert on May 10, 1906. She died in 1950.

== Death and legacy ==
McIntyre died at Brooke Army Medical Center on September 6, 1954, and was buried at Fort Sam Houston National Cemetery.
