= Remillard (surname) =

Remillard or Rémillard is a Canadian surname that may refer to the following notable people:

- Remillard Brothers, owners of brick manufacturing plants in California, U.S., from the 1860s to the mid-1900s
- Remillard, a protagonist family in the Galactic Milieu Series
- Bruno N Rémillard (born 1961), Canadian mathematical statistician
- Édouard Rémillard (1830–1909), Canadian lawyer and political figure
- Gil Rémillard (born 1944), Canadian university professor and politician
- Marc Rémillard, French-Canadian electronic music artist and producer
- Matt Remillard (born 1986), American boxer
- Maxime Rémillard, Canadian businessman
- Nicholas Rémillard (born 1976), Canadian scholar
- Will Remillard (born 1992), American baseball coach
- Zach Remillard (born 1994), American baseball player

== Fictional people ==
- The Remillard family of the Galactic Milieu Series by Julian May
