= Remillard =

Remillard or Rémillard may refer to

- Remillard (surname)
- Ashworth-Remillard House, a historic farm house in San Jose, California, US
- Centre scolaire Léo-Rémillard, a French-language high school in Winnipeg, Manitoba, Canada
