= Beschloss =

Beschloss is a surname. Notable people with the surname include:

- Afsaneh Mashayekhi Beschloss (born 1956), Iranian national treasurer and chief investment officer of the World Bank, wife of Michael
- Michael Beschloss (born 1955), American historian
