= Nicholas Rémillard =

President, chief executive (born 1976)

Nicholas Rémillard (born March 22, 1976) is the President and Chief Executive Officer of the International Economic Forum of the Americas (IEFA), which hosts three annual economic forums, the Conference of Montreal, the Toronto Global Forum and the World Strategic Forum, which is held in Miami, Florida.

== Biography ==
Nicholas Rémillard graduated with a law degree from Ottawa University in 2001, and was then appointed Deputy Manager of the International Economic Forum of the Americas.

In 2007, Nicholas Rémillard launched the Toronto Forum for Global Cities, now held under the appellation Toronto Global Forum. This Forum is an organization presenting annual conferences on global economic issues, with an emphasis on the relations between the Americas and the other continents.

Since 2010, he is the President and chief executive officer of the International Economic Forum of the Americas.

In 2011, he founded the Palm Beach Strategic Forum, now called the World Strategic Forum, an organization presenting annual conferences in Miami to foster exchanges of information and to promote free discussion on major current economic issues.

Nicholas Rémillard also serves as Honorary Consul General of Iceland in Montreal.

Nicholas Rémillard is the son of Gil Rémillard, former minister of Justice of Québec and Founding Chairman of the International Economic Forum of the Americas, and Marie DuPont, Chief Editor of Magazine FORCES, and has two sons.

== Honours ==
In 2012, Nicholas Rémillard received the Montréal Centre Ville (MCV) Event Award. This award "singles out an event or demonstration that generated a lot of buzz this year and got the attention of the heads at Destination Centre-Ville and Montréal_Centre-Ville".
