= Afsaneh Mashayekhi Beschloss =

Iranian-American economist

Afsaneh Beschloss
- Born: Afsaneh Mashayekhi; July 28, 1955 (age 71); Tehran, Imperial State of Iran
- Education: University of Kent (BA); St Antony's College, Oxford (MPhil)
- Spouse: Michael Beschloss
- Children: 2

Afsaneh Mashayekhi Beschloss (Persian: افسانه مشایخی; born July 28, 1955) is an American economist and entrepreneur. She is the CEO of RockCreek, an investment firm that she founded in 2003. Since the firm's inception, it has invested over $15 billion in woman-owned and minority-owned firms.

== Early life ==
Beschloss was born in Tehran, Iran in 1956. Her father, Mohammad Mashayekhi, was a prominent education reformer and president of a national teacher training university during the reign of Shah Mohammad Reza Pahlavi, despite his political leanings towards liberal democracy and Mohammad Mosaddegh.

Her father was initially barred from leaving the country following the overthrow of the shah during the 1979 revolution, but Mashayekhi's family came to the United States in the 1980s, settling in the Washington, D.C. area and becoming American citizens.

== Education ==
Beschloss received a Bachelor of Arts in economics from the University of Kent, and M.Phil. in economics from St Antony's College, Oxford.

== Career ==
Beschloss taught international trade and economic development at Queen Elizabeth House, as part of the Oxford University Diplomatic Studies Programme. She began her career in the United States at J.P. Morgan in corporate finance. She then moved to the World Bank, of which she became Treasurer and Chief Investment Officer. She was a member of the 1994 class of the World Economic Forum's Global Leaders for Tomorrow program.

She led the World Bank's energy investments and policy work on areas including renewable energy, power and infrastructure to reduce carbon emissions. In 1987, Beschloss also worked at Shell International Group Planning in London, and later became a managing director and partner of the Carlyle Group.

Beschloss founded the investment firm RockCreek Group in 2003. As of 2019, it managed over $14 billion in investments. The firm was an early adopter of investments based on environmental, social, and corporate governance.

In 2018, Beschloss was appointed to trustee positions at the Doris Duke Charitable Foundation and Dana–Farber Cancer Institute, as well as to the board of directors at the Center for Global Development. She co-chaired the 2018 Conference of Montreal for the International Economic Forum of the Americas. In 2019, she joined the board of trustees for the National Geographic Society.

She is the co-author of The Economics of Natural Gas (Oxford) and has written numerous journal articles on climate, finance, renewable energy and impact investment, published by Chatham House and The Globe and Mail, among others.

Beschloss was chosen by the Carnegie Corporation of New York for its list of "Great Immigrants, Great Americans 2020" and has received the Institutional Investor Lifetime Achievement Award and the Robert F. Kennedy Human Rights Ripple of Hope Award.

Beschloss is a member of the advisory board for CNBC's 2022 Delivering Alpha Investor Summit.

== Other activities ==
- American Red Cross, Member of the Board of Trustees (since 2013)
- World Resources Institute, Member of the Board of Trustees (since 2013)
- Institute for Advanced Study in Princeton, New Jersey, Member of the Board of Trustees (since 2015)
- Blum Center for Developing Economies at the University of California, Berkeley, Member of the Board of Directors (since 2020)
- Bretton Woods Committee, Member of the Board of Directors (since 2020)
- Council on Foreign Relations, Member of the Board of Directors (since 2020)
- Georgetown University, Member of the Board of Directors (since 2020)
- PBS Foundation, chair of the Board of Trustees (since 2020)
- Center for Development Economics at Williams College, Member of the Visiting Committee
- Center for Global Development (CGD), Member of the Board of Directors
- Colonial Williamsburg Foundation, former Member of the Board of Trustees
- Ford Foundation, former member of the board of trustees and Chair of the Investment Committee
- Gavi, the Vaccine Alliance, Member of the Board
- Rockefeller Brothers Fund, Member of the Finance Committee
- Urban Institute, former Member of the Board of Trustees
- World Wide Web Foundation, former chair of the board

== Personal life ==
She is married to Michael Beschloss, a presidential historian.

In 2008, she contributed $25,000 to the Obama Victory Fund, $10,000 to the Democratic National Committee, and $2,300 to Obama for America.

== See also ==
- List of Iranian women writers and poets
