= Green Brae Brick Yard =

Historic building in California, United States

- U.S. National Register of Historic Places
- California Historical Landmark
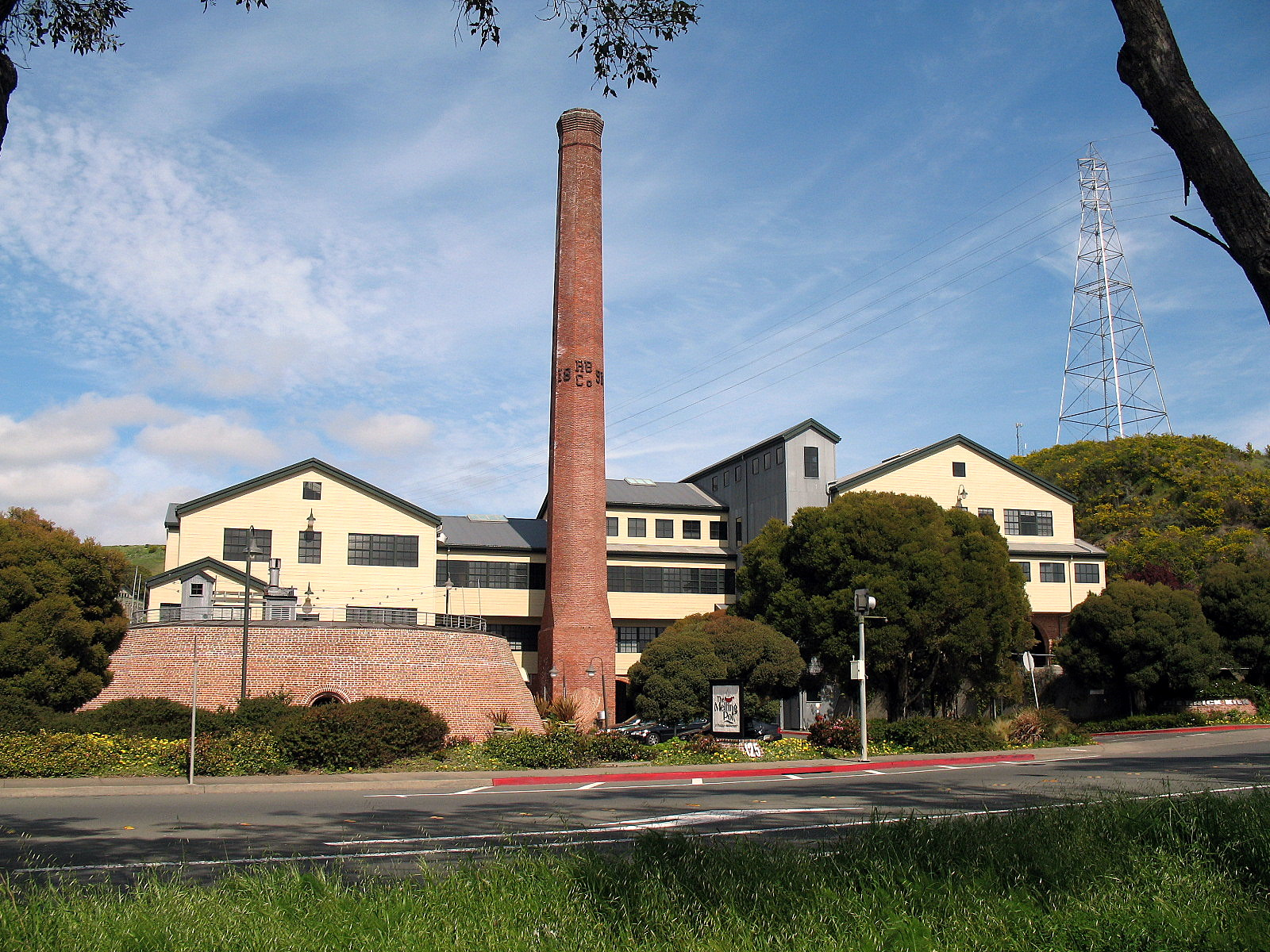

- Location within San Francisco Bay Area Location within California Location within the United States
- Location: 125 E. Sir Francis Drake Blvd., Larkspur, California, US
- Coordinates: 37°56′43″N 122°30′12″W
- Area: 1.7 acres (0.69 ha)
- Architectural style: Hoffman Type kiln
- NRHP reference No.: 78000704
- CHISL No.: 917

Significant dates
- Added to NRHP: March 24, 1978
- Designated CHISL: January 31, 1978

The Green Brae Brick Yard (also known as the Green Brae Brickyard) is a former brickyard in Larkspur, California, United States. Built by Remillard Brothers, the brickyard opened in 1891 and closed in 1915, later becoming a quarry. It later became a commercial development in the 1980s. The Green Brae Brick Yard consisted of 25 buildings at its maximum extent, of which two remain. One of the remaining structures is the kiln, a brick structure with rounded ends and a toroid vault; there is a brick chimney next to it. The site is listed on the National Register of Historic Places, and the kiln is a California Historical Landmark.

== Description ==
The Green Brae Brick Yard is at 125 E. Sir Francis Drake Boulevard in Larkspur, California, United States. The former brickyard consisted of 25 buildings at its maximum extent, of which two remain: the kiln itself and its chimney. The yard replaced an earlier "beehive" kiln built by Remillard Brothers, the brickyard's developer. At its peak between 1891 and 1915, the yard had sixty workers, who lived in 16 cabins; the worker camp also contained a barn, vegetable garden, cookhouse, forge, fifteen horse stables, and a miniature brewery and railroad. There was also a green-and-white superintendent's cottage.

The yard's kiln was a Hoffman Type kiln, based on a model invented by Friedrich Hoffmann. Unlike previous types of kilns that required brick to cool down after being fired, aHoffman kiln could accommodate new bricks as older ones cooled down. The kiln itself is a brick structure with rounded ends, which measures 64 by 195 feet (20 by 59 m) across and 12 feet (3.7 m) high. It has battered exterior walls insulated with an 8-foot (2.4 m) layer of earth, and a flat roof with portholes to fire coal into the kiln. The interior of the kiln is a toroid, a circle with a circumference of 370 feet (110 m); the cross-section is 14 feet (4.3 m) across and 11 feet (3.4 m) high. There are 16 mini-kilns, each with openings to bring brick in and out of the kiln. Next to the kiln is a 29,500-square-foot (2,740 m^{2}) office building constructed in 1989.

The central section of the kiln has flues and dampers connected via an underground flue to the chimney stack. The chimney stack is built of unreinforced brick with a tapering octagonal cross section measuring 125 feet (38 m) or 130 feet (40 m) high. The base has the inscription "R.B. Co.", along with the completion year "1891". Unlike standard Hoffman kilns where the stack is directly above the main flue, the Green Brae chimney is outside the kiln.

== History ==
=== Industrial use ===
In precolonial times, the brickyard's site was inhabited by the Coast Miwok Native Americans. The Remillard Brothers first obtained 75 acres (30 ha) in Marin County, California, for a brickyard in the 1870s. This was superseded in 1889 by a 150-acre (61 ha) site in Green Brae (later part of Larkspur and distinct from the modern community of Greenbrae). The Green Brae Brick Yard opened in 1891, complementing the firm's other brickyards at Pleasanton and San Jose, California. At its peak, the kiln produced 500,000 bricks a year. Bricks from Remillard's operations, which totaled six brickyards at its peak, were used throughout the San Francisco Bay Area, including at the Carolands house. Many of the bricks were used to rebuild San Francisco after the 1906 earthquake that devastated the city.

The kiln closed in 1915. Subsequently, the land became a quarry. Some sources wrote that the quarry began operation in 1924, while others state that Lillian Remillard—the daughter of Remillard Brothers' founder, Pierre—sold the land in the early 1930s. In any case, the quarry operated until the late 1950s. The quarry used the superintendent's cottage of the brickyard as an office. The site was annexed by the city of Larkspur in 1969, shortly before Lillian's death. Larkspur City Councilman Robert Lee, who discovered a surviving 1.7-acre (0.69 ha) section of the brickyard at the quarry, gained ownership of the property. Lillian had agreed to give Lee the quarry site on the condition that the brickyard be preserved.

=== Redevelopment ===
After Larkspur's annexation, much of the site was planned to be redeveloped as part of the Larkspur Landing ferry terminal and housing development. By then, the brickyard was in poor condition: The two remaining structures had bat and skunk infestations, the kiln was overgrown, and parts of the structures had settled. The film Dirty Harry was filmed at the brickyard in 1971, and Lee subsequently announced plans to turn the kiln into a restaurant as part of the redevelopment. The plans called for some of the old brick to be reused in the project. Lee and his partners wanted to preserve the brickyard and sell the rest of the quarry site for development, but the Larkspur City Council mandated that they complete a environmental impact statement report before doing so. The environmental impact report, published in 1975, found that the kiln's rehabilitation, along with the relocation of a neighboring sewage plant, would improve the views from the site. The development was approved in 1975.

The kiln was designated as California Historical Landmark No. 917 in 1978, and the entire brickyard was added to the National Register of Historic Places that year. The Green Brae Brick Yard's supervisor's residence, Remillard Cottage, was designated as a California Historical Landmark in 1979 and was relocated to the nearby Larkspur Landing Circle in December 1984. After being relocated, Remillard Cottage became a preschool. Lee, meanwhile, had sold his share of the brickyard to his partners, who themselves later resold the site. The rest of the site later became a commercial development. Various proposals for the brickyard were put forth in the 1980s, particularly following the closure of a nearby sewage plant.

In 1984, after extended negotiations, the Larkspur City Council reluctantly agreed to allow large office development next to the kiln and chimney. The developer, Lincoln Property Company, could not afford to save the chimney and sold the entire site in 1987 to Raymond Kuratek, who pledged to save the site. Unlike previous proposals, Kuratek's design called for a building matching the architecture of the existing kiln and chimney. The office building was built next to the brick kiln in 1989, and a French restaurant, Remillard's, opened in the kiln shortly after. The restaurant expanded outdoors in 1991 and later became Bolero, then El Quijote. The restaurant was ultimately forced to close because it lost access to its parking lot, which had been leased from the neighboring Ross Valley Sanitary District; the loss of the parking lot made it impossible to attract workers during lunch. Further attempts to attract lunchtime operators proved unsuccessful.

== See also ==
- California Historical Landmarks in Marin County
- National Register of Historic Places listings in Marin County, California

== Sources ==
- Eisenberg, Jonathan (November 1991). "Four-star Treatment". Historic Preservation. Vol. 43, no. 6. pp. 62, 64–65. ProQuest 2283845211.
- [National Park Service] (1978). National Register of Historic Places Inventory/Nomination: Green Brae Brick Yard (Report). National Park Service. With accompanying pictures
