= Gil Rémillard =

Canadian lawyer

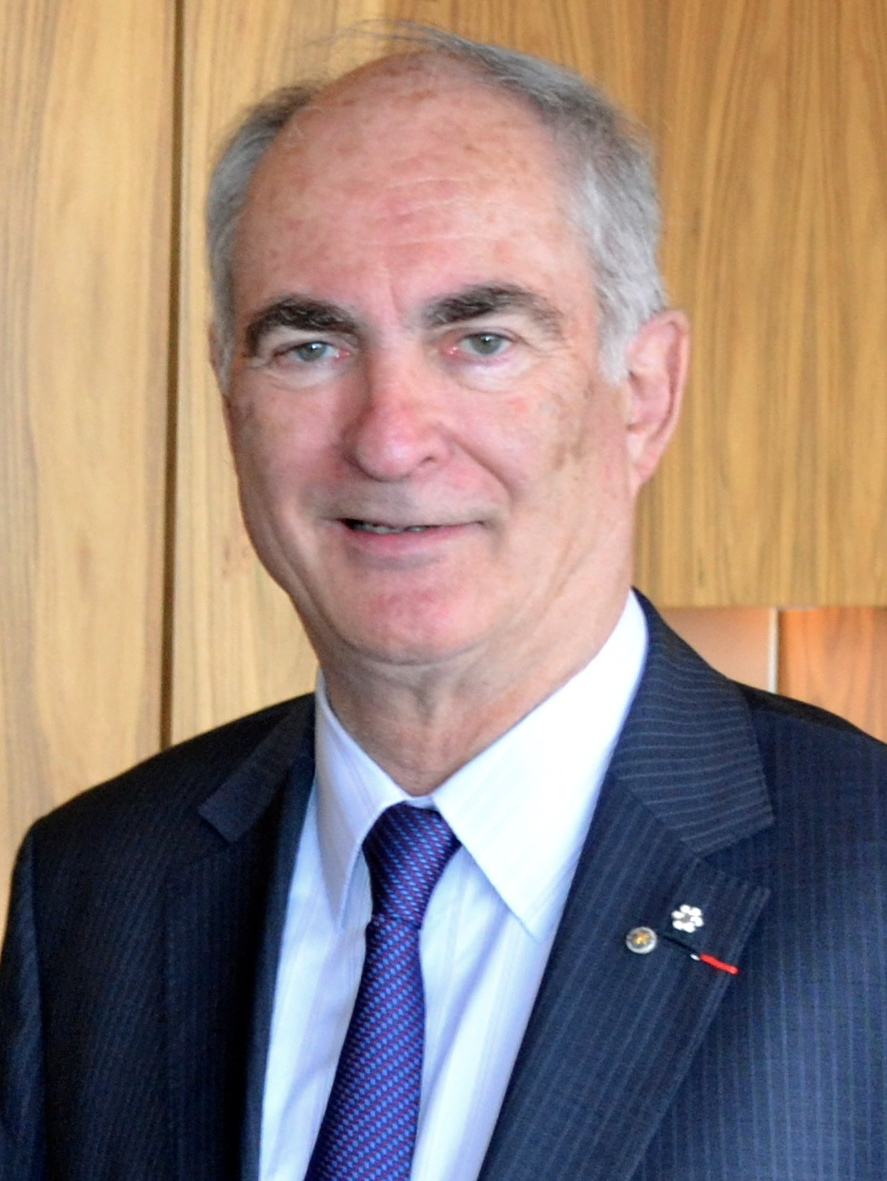
Gil Rémillard in 2014

Gil Rémillard CM CQ (born November 25, 1944) is a Canadian academic, university professor and politician.

== Biography ==
Born in Hull, Quebec (now Gatineau, Quebec), Rémillard is the son of Carmel Rémillard and Jeannine Desjardins. He studied at the University of Ottawa, where he obtained a licence in law in 1968, and at the Université de Nice, where he obtained a State doctorate in constitutional law in 1972.

From 1972 until 1985, he was professor of public law at Laval University, specializing in constitutional law and communications law. He was also legal counsel for departments of the governments of Quebec and of Canada.

He ran as a candidate for the Quebec Liberal Party in the 1985 Quebec general election in the riding of Jean-Talon and was elected to the National Assembly. In the second government of Robert Bourassa, he was appointed minister of International Relations (1985-1988), minister of Canadian Intergovernmental Affairs (1985-1994), minister of Justice (1988-1994) and minister of Public Security (1988-1989). He was reelected to the Assembly in the 1989 general election.

He resigned from the Assembly in 1994.

He founded the International conference of constitutional law, and the International institute of administrative studies. Mr. Rémillard is also the Founding Chairman of the International Economic Forum of the Americas (1994), which annually presents the Conference of Montreal, the Toronto Global Forum, the World Strategic Forum, held in Miami, and the Conference of Paris.

== Honours ==
- Member of the Order of Canada (2001)
- Knight of the National Order of Quebec (2004)
