= David Allen Raley =

American murderer on death row

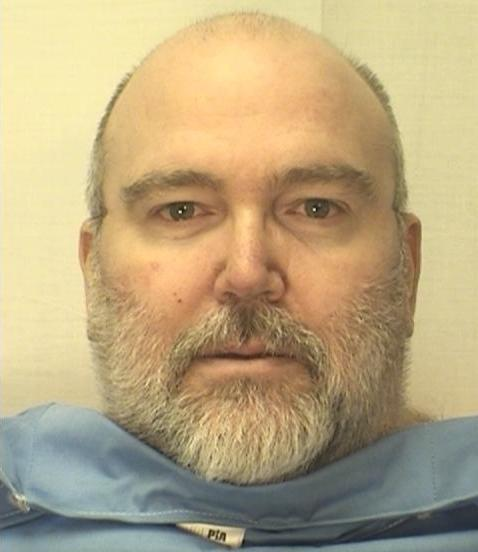
- Born: November 9, 1961 (age 64); Santa Clara County, California U.S.
- Occupation: Security guard
- Status: Incarcerated
- Conviction: Murder
- Criminal charges: First degree murder, attempted murder, assault (x2)
- Penalty: Death (commuted to life without the possibility of parole)

Details
- Victims: 1
- Date: February 2, 1985
- Country: USA
- State: California
- Location: Carolands mansion in Hillsborough, California
- Imprisoned at: California State Prison, Sacramento

David Allen Raley (born November 9, 1961) is a convicted murderer and currently incarcerated at California State Prison, Sacramento. He was convicted of first-degree murder in the death of Jeanine Grinsell, aged 16, and attempted murder of Laurie McKenna, aged 17. The two girls were attacked and kidnapped on February 2, 1985, at the Carolands mansion in Hillsborough in San Mateo County, where Raley, then aged 23, was working as a security guard.

== Crimes ==
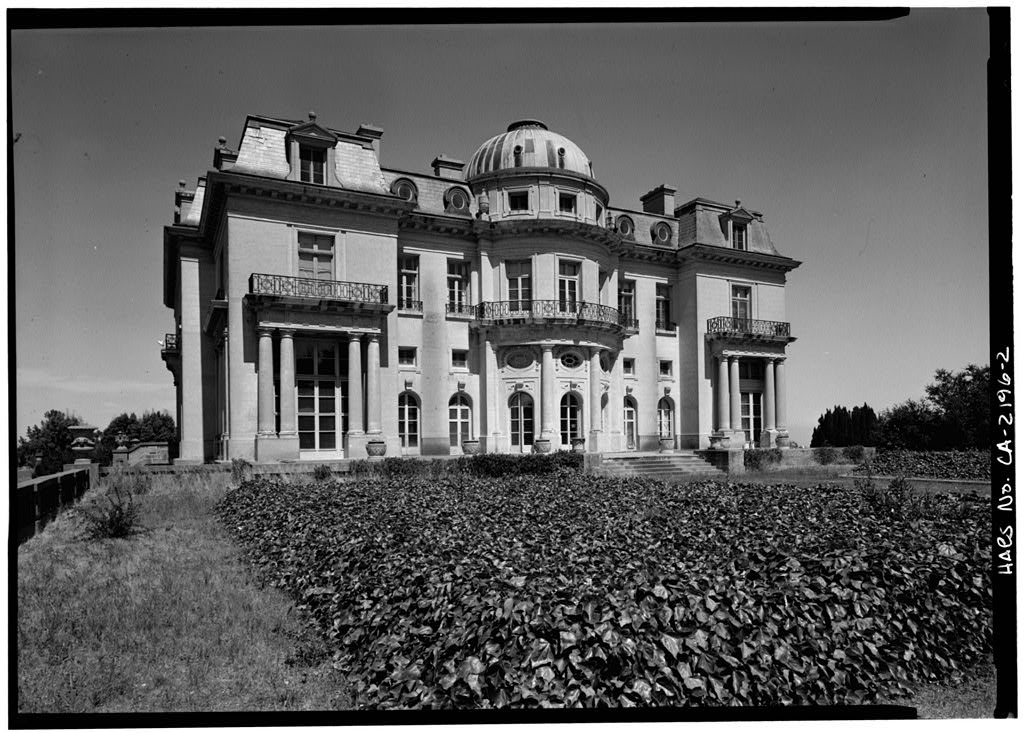
Front of Carolands, photographed by Jack Boucher for HABS in 1974

Carolands, a mansion completed in 1914 for Harriet Pullman Carolan, had been vacant since the mid-1970s and was not open to the public. However, Raley, who worked as a security guard there, was known to give unauthorized tours occasionally. Raley was especially receptive to giving tours to high school-age girls, and he would provide "salacious commentary" during the tours; for example, he once requested a young female tourist enter a safe and scream to demonstrate how soundproof the location was, after which he commented that he could kill someone in the basement and no one would hear. On Saturday, February 2, 1985, Raley was interviewed by a journalism student who was writing a story about the mansion, telling her, "You wouldn't believe the things girls offer me. Food, money, sex – anything to get inside."

Later that same Saturday, McKenna and Grinsell came to explore Carolands; they had heard stories from other students that unofficial tours were available. Raley agreed to allow them to enter provided they parked their car where it could not be seen. During the tour, he commented that guards would sometimes receive sexual favors in exchange for allowing entry; after the tour, he hid the girls in a basement safe, saying that police dogs had arrived and that he could lose his job for allowing the tour. They begged not to be hidden there, and although he assured them he would not close the door, he did and would not release them until they had undressed to their underwear. During their captivity at the mansion, he sexually assaulted, beat, and stabbed the two girls. He later bound Grinsell with rope and rolled McKenna up in a carpet, then hid them in the trunk of his car, a 1973 Plymouth.

Raley's shift at the mansion ended at 4 PM, but he was not relieved of his duty until his supervisor arrived at 5:15 PM. He drove to and parked in the garage of his house in south San Jose, where he let the two girls out of the trunk; McKenna asked to be taken to a hospital and swore not to tell anyone who had injured them, but Raley responded with a silent "death stare" of hatred. After hearing voices, he pushed them back into the trunk and threatened to kill them if they did not remain quiet. At about 7 PM, he emerged from the garage into the house, which he shared with his sister and parents, and refused dinner, then watched TV and played Monopoly with his sister until approximately 11 PM. His parents returned to the house after midnight; Raley told them he had cleaned the garage.

Later, Raley moved the car with the girls still inside the trunk from the garage to a parking spot across the street. After midnight, he drove to a ravine off Silver Creek Road; approximately 10 miles (16 km) southeast of downtown San Jose and beat them again before dumping them into the ravine, which was used as a makeshift garbage dump. The overnight weather included drizzle and temperatures close to freezing. At daybreak, McKenna, bloodied and battered, pulled herself out of the ravine and flagged down a passing pickup truck at approximately 8:30 AM. Three cars passed without stopping before the truck stopped. A jogger who encountered the two girls would later testify at a preliminary hearing that both were conscious and able to talk. Both Grinsell and McKenna identified Raley as their assailant. At the time they were found, both girls were still alive, but Grinsell died at 11:35 AM from blood loss, shock, and hypothermia at Santa Teresa Hospital, where they had been taken for treatment. She had been stabbed 41 times, had suffered a skull fracture, and had no measurable blood pressure.

=== Trial ===
Raley was arrested on the evening of February 3 and charged on February 6 with one count of murder, one count of attempted murder, two counts of assault with intent to commit rape, and two counts of kidnapping; due to the special circumstances, which included the torture of the two girls, he was eligible for the death penalty.

Jury selection lasted approximately two months, and Raley's trial began in March 1987. During the trial, Raley presented evidence that he was not alone in providing unauthorized tours to young people, including boys, and that Grinsell might have survived had she been immediately treated for hypothermia. He was convicted on the counts of first-degree murder, attempted murder, and kidnapping with special circumstances on April 22, 1987, and a second trial would commence on May 5 to determine if he would receive the death penalty.

The penalty phase trial jury deadlocked 7–5 in favor of the death penalty, and a mistrial was declared on May 15, 1987. The penalty phase was retried starting on February 29, 1988, and Raley was sentenced to death on May 17. During the penalty phase retrial, the prosecution presented criminal incidents from Raley's juvenile record, which included lewd acts with children that occurred when he was a teenager.

Raley's automatic appeal before the Supreme Court of California was largely denied in 1992. En banc, the Supreme Court of California upheld his conviction on almost all of the criminal charges and death sentence; the Court overturned the conviction for attempted oral copulation with Grinsell, ruling that the charge was speculative and based on his actions with McKenna. A panel of judges from the 9th U.S. Circuit Court of Appeals unanimously upheld his death sentence in 2006; a request for a rehearing was rejected in November 2006. The Supreme Court of the United States rejected Raley's final appeal in 2007.

In 2013, Raley's lawyers stated their client was autistic and asked that his sentence be commuted to life imprisonment without the possibility of parole, citing Atkins v. Virginia, a 2002 Supreme Court case that called the execution of a criminal with intellectual disabilities cruel and unusual punishment. Raley attempted to fire his lawyers for arguing that he was intellectually disabled, and the commutation request was rejected in September 2013.

In December 2006, U.S. District Judge Jeremy D. Fogel stayed all executions in California after his review of the lethal injection protocol and tour of the execution chamber in San Quentin determined the existing protocol was "deeply disturbing" and "broken," possibly violating the constitutional ban on cruel and unusual punishment. Over the next five years, state officials constructed a new chamber and overhauled the execution procedure; Fogel inspected the chamber again in 2011 to determine if California is ready to resume executions. Raley is one of at least six inmates on death row who had exhausted their appeals by 2011. The updated lethal injection method had not been reviewed when U.S. District Judge Cormac Carney ruled in 2014 that California's capital punishment law was unconstitutional because of the prolonged appeals process, effectively setting aside the death penalty indefinitely for Raley and more than a dozen other inmates on death row. In late 2017, the state Supreme Court upheld Proposition 66, which allowed prison officials to finalize the execution procedures, in turn allowing the federal courts to review the revised protocols; Raley would be one of 18 inmates to receive an execution date. His death sentence was later commuted to life without the possibility of parole.
