= Remillard Brothers =

Owners of US brick manufacturing plants

The Remillard brothers and members of their family were successful owners of brick manufacturing plants in Oakland and San Francisco, California from the 1860s to the mid-1900s.

The three brothers who founded the brick making company, and started the Remillard fortune, immigrated from St. Valentin (near Napierville), Quebec to California toward the end of the California Gold Rush.

== Pierre-Nicolas "Peter" Remillard ==
Pierre-Nicolas "Peter" Remillard was born April 2, 1837, at St. Valentin, Quebec. In 1854 he came to California as an aspiring and self-reliant seventeen-year-old. He became involved in gold mining and saved what was later described in his obituary as a "snug sum" of money.

In 1861, at the age of twenty-four, he moved to Oakland, where he became an employee of a brickyard. Within five years, he rose from hired hand at the brickyard to its owner and opened an office and yard at Clay and 2nd Streets and a brick plant in nearby Brooklyn. His brothers Hilaire and Edward also came from Quebec to join him in the enterprise. The business expanded and, in 1879, was incorporated as Remillard Brick Company. For a number of years, the Remillard brothers provided contracting service to the building trade in addition to manufacturing bricks. In 1882, the company established a large yard at Pleasanton.

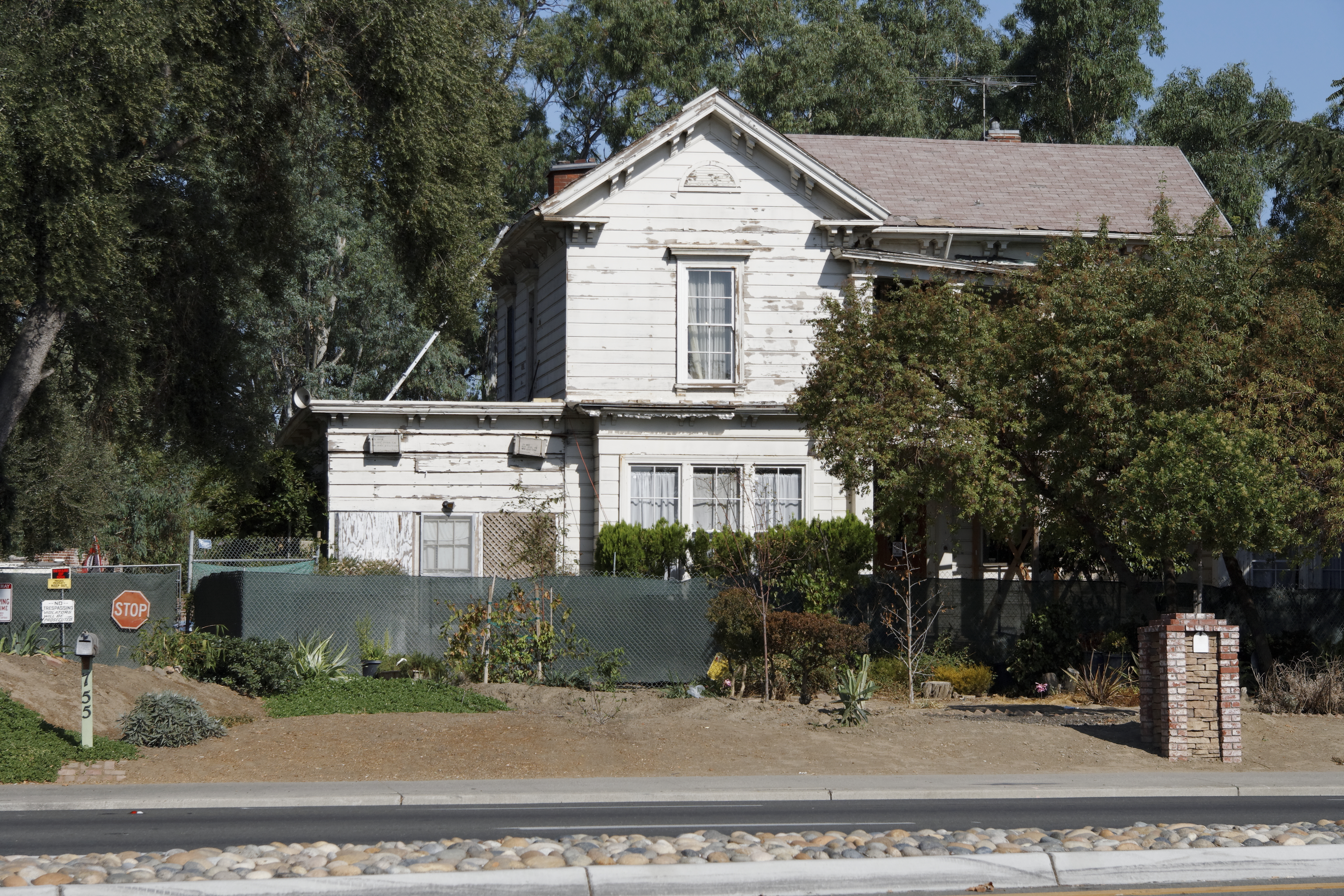
Peter Remillard House, later Lillian Remillard Dandini house, in San Jose, a U.S. National Register of Historic Places

The Remillards supplied bricks for many important buildings including the old Palace Hotel in San Francisco and many large and important buildings in Oakland. For some forty years the Remillards were the only brick manufacturing company in Alameda County, supplied material for nearly every brick building in the county, and held a near monopoly on supplying bricks to the Western United States and Pacific Islands. In 1890, a yard was established at Greenbrae in Marin County and two years later in 1892, the Remillards established a yard that employed over 300 men at San Jose, Santa Clara County.

Pierre-Nicolas Remillard married Cordule Laurin in January 1867 in San Francisco. They lived in the Ashworth-Remillard House, a National Register of Historic Places. He died suddenly on August 3, 1904, at his home on Adams and Perkins Street in Oakland, California from a heart attack. Although he had been in poor health for the previous year, he was able to go to his office until about three months before his death. Pierre Remillard was one of the founders of the First Unitarian Church of Oakland and one of the first members of the Athenian Club.

Pierre Remillard's blue Eastlake frame home is in Preservation Park, at Martin Luther King Jr. Way and 13th Street in Oakland. Remillard Park in Berkeley was named for him in 1964 after the land for part of the park was donated by his daughter, Countess Lillian Remillard Dandini.

=== Remillard Brick Company ===
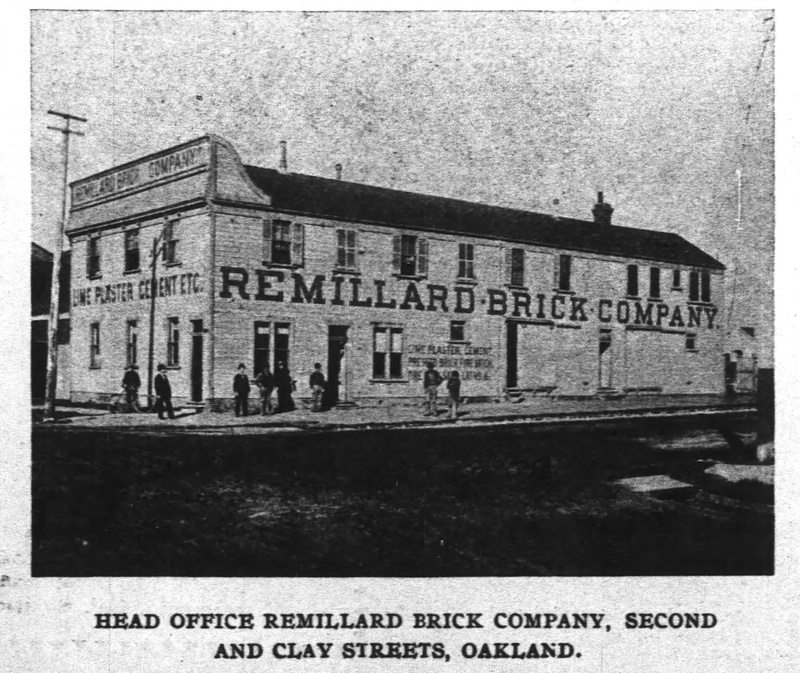
Remillard Brick Company in 1901

The Remillard Brick Company was the largest brick manufacturer on the Pacific coast. The Remillard Brick Company opened brickyards in San Francisco Bay area:

- East Oakland Remillard Brickyard, opened in 1864
- Pleasanton Remillard Brickyard
- San Jose Remillard Brickyard (1891-1968)
- Greenbrae Remillard Brickyard ran for 103 years on the San Quentin Peninsula.

The Greenbrae Remillard Brickyard's Green Brae Brick Kiln is a California Historical Landmark No. 917. The remains of the Greenbrae kiln are between San Quentin and the Larkspur ferry landing. The Greenbrae kiln has been converted into an upscale restaurant. The Greenbrae Remillard bricks were used to build Ghirardelli Square, the Palace Hotel, and many other San Francisco buildings the 1906 earthquake and fire. Edward Remillard invented some improvements in brickmaking and has United States patents for some of these brick these improvements. Peter Remillard also make improvements in brick making. Cordule and Lillian, Peter's daughter ran the company after Peter Remillard died in 1904. In addition to bricks Remillard Brick Company also made and sold cement, lime, cleaned sand and plaster.

== Philippe-Hilaire "Philip" Remillard ==
Philippe-Hilaire "Philip" Remillard was born December 18, 1834, at St-Valentin, Quebec. At the age of nineteen, he went to Boston where he learned brick making. He remained at Boston from 1852 to 1854 before heading west to San Francisco by the “Nicaragua Route” through the Isthmus of Panama where he arrived February 17, 1854. He first went to the mining areas in Nevada where he remained until 1860. He made some money in and around Auburn, California and then went to Oakland. He became interested in what was called the “Idaho excitement” and went there until 1862 when he returned to East Oakland. By 1864, he was involved in brick making in a very modest way and the business soon expanded to become the largest of its kind in the area.

In 1878, he purchased a block at the corner of Adeline and 42nd Street, where the family home remained until about 1883 when his widowed mother erected a beautiful home at 999 43rd Street (not extant). Unmarried, he was referred to as "one of the most popular clubmen of Oakland" and a "bon vivant." He died March 12, 1901, after a fall. He was vice president of Remillard Brick Company at the time of his death.

== Edouard "Edward" Remillard ==
Edouard "Edward" Remillard was born February 1, 1840, at St-Valentin, Quebec. In 1859 he left Quebec and went to California to join his two older brothers. He first went to the mines for a brief period and soon went to Oakland and San Francisco where the three brothers became partners in the Remillard Brothers Brick Company.

He returned to Canada in about 1866 and there he married his second cousin Virginie Remillard on January 14, 1867, at Napierville. She was the daughter of Narcisse and Rosalie Monjon and was baptized December 15, 1847, at Napierville. He and Virginia first lived in East Oakland, where they erected a comfortable dwelling before moving to Clay Street, where they lived until 1887 when they moved to 1355 Webster Street. He died March 10, 1903, in Oakland at the age of 63 years while sitting in a chair talking to his brother, P.N. Remillard.

== Countess Lillian Remillard Dandini ==
Countess Lillian Remillard Dandini was the daughter of Pierre-Nicolas and Cordule (Laurin) Remillard. She was born April 28, 1880, in Oakland and died July 17, 1973, in Hillsborough, California. She inherited the company from her father after the accidental death of her brother Philip from a fall from a San Francisco restaurant fire escape in March 1901.

She was noted for her ownership and preservation of the architectural gem, Chateau Carolands in Hillsborough, California, at one time the second largest house in the United States, which she bought in 1953 and lived in until her death. She willed the Chateau to the city of Hillsborough for a museum of music and art, but left no money to acquire the music or the art and in the end, the city of Hillsborough sold the house. She married Count Alessandro Dandini about 1932; they divorced about 1939.

== See also ==
- California Historical Landmarks in Marin County

== Burial ==
Many members of the Remillard family were buried in the Remillard Mausoleum in Mountain View Cemetery (Oakland, California), where many Bay Area millionaires are buried. Edward and his wife were buried in the adjacent Saint Mary's Cemetery.
