= International Economic Forum of the Americas =

Nonprofit organization based in Canada

- Abbreviation: IEFA
- Founded: 1995
- Headquarters: Montreal, Quebec, Canada
- Founding Chairman: Gil Rémillard
- President and CEO: Nicholas Rémillard
- Subsidiaries: Conference of Montreal; Toronto Global Forum; World Strategic Forum
- Website: forum-americas.org

The International Economic Forum of the Americas (IEFA), is an international not-for-profit organization headquartered in Canada, with offices in Montreal, Toronto, Miami and Paris. The IEFA was created in 1995 to promote an exchange of views and perspectives on pressing economic issues of our times among world leaders, renowned experts and business executives. It organizes several high-level conferences per year and has grown to become a landmark organization bringing together more than 10,000 participants and 600 speakers every year.

== Mission ==
The International Economic Forum of the Americas was founded to facilitate agreements, offer business opportunities and provide access to unique insights from leading experts and specialists.

The Forum has grown to become a landmark organization bringing together more than 10,000 delegates and over 6000 speakers combined under the auspices of four annual conferences: the Conference of Montreal, the Toronto Global Forum, the World Strategic Forum and the Conference of Paris.

== History ==
The International Economic Forum of the Americas was founded in 1995, when Gil Rémillard, a former Minister of Justice of Quebec, held an inaugural Conference of Montreal, on June 20–22, 1995.

At the time, the globalization of the economies was beginning to emerge at an increased rate. With the end of the Cold War, the success of the "Uruguay round" in 1989, the creation of the World Trade Organization (WTO) in 1994 and the beginnings of the North American Free Trade Agreement (NAFTA), the world was ready to construct a global market that would benefit of every countries. A desire emerged to create an independent international forum in Montreal, to identify and understand the impact of all these developments on the global economic system.

The IEFA now hosts four annual events: the Conference of Montreal, the Toronto Global Forum, the World Strategic Forum, held in Miami and The Conference of Paris. These conferences and forums have welcomed past and present politicians, heads of states, corporate executives, central bankers and global economic decision makers.

== Organization ==
=== Conference of Montreal ===
The Conference of Montreal is an annual event organized by the International Economic Forum of the Americas, since 1995. The Conference is committed to heightening knowledge and awareness of the major issues concerning economic globalization, with a particular emphasis on the relations between the Americas and other continents.

=== Toronto Global Forum ===
The Toronto Global Forum is the second annual event presented by the International Economic Forum of the Americas, since 2007. The event fosters dialogue on national and global issues, in the context of changing dynamics in the economy.

=== World Strategic Forum ===
The World Strategic Forum is the third annual event, held in Miami under the auspices of the International Economic Forum of Americas, established in 2011. Its mission is to address the major governance challenges of the new world economic order, focusing on the central role of the Americas and the place of the United States of America. The Forum was held in Palm Beach, Florida, for its first four editions. The subsequent editions, as of 2015, are held in Miami, Florida.

=== The Conference of Paris ===
The Conference of Paris is the most recent annual event presented by the International Economic Forum of the Americas, since 2017. The Conference of Paris is gathering major international stakeholders in Paris to discuss and reassess globalization with a particular focus on the role Europe can play.

== Publications ==
The Global Economy – The Foundation for the Next Era of Growth is a multi-authored examination of the current business state of affairs, compiled to mark the 20th anniversary edition of the Conference of Montreal and the IEFA.

Authors :

- Shaukat Aziz, former Prime Minister of Pakistan (2004–2007)
- Dominic Barton, global managing director, McKinsey & Company
- The Hon. Perrin Beatty, president and chief executive officer, The Canadian Chamber of Commerce
- Paul Desmarais, Jr., chairman and co-chief executive officer, Power Corporation of Canada
- Christoph Frei, secretary general, World Energy Council
- Angel Gurría, secretary-general, Organisation for Economic Co-operation and Development (OECD)
- Donald Kaberuka, former president, African Development Bank (2005–2015)
- Pierre Lortie, senior business advisor, Dentons Canada LLP
- Gérard Mestrallet, chairman and chief executive officer, Engie
- Gordon Nixon, former president and chief executive officer, Royal Bank of Canada (RBC) (2001–2014)
- Christian Noyer, governor, Bank of France, and former chairman, Bank for International Settlements (BIS) (2005–2010)
- Avi Reichental, former president and chief executive officer, 3D Systems
- Gil Rémillard, founding chairman, International Economic Forum of the Americas
- Adam Steinhouse, International European Union consultant; affiliated professor, École nationale d'administration publique (ENAP)
- Maria van der Hoeven, former executive director, International Energy Agency

== See also ==
- Conference of Montreal
- Toronto Global Forum
- World Strategic Forum
