= World Strategic Forum =

- Organized by: International Economic Forum of the Americas
- Type: International Conference
- Frequency: Annually
- Founded: 2011
- Founded by: Nicholas Rémillard
- Location: Florida, United States: Palm Beach (till 2014); Miami (since 2015)
- Topics: Economy; Finance; Infrastructure; Art & Luxury; Energy; Trade; Agriculture
- Next Event: November 24-25, 2025
- Sister Organizations: Conference of Montreal; Toronto Global Forum; Conference of Paris
- Website: forum-americas.org/miami

The World Strategic Forum is an annual economic event organized by the International Economic Forum of the Americas since 2011.

== Mission ==
The World Strategic Forum is a not-for-profit organization whose mission is to address the major governance challenges and to foster dialogues on national and global issues by bringing together heads of state, the private sector, international organizations and civil society. It also attempts to foster exchanges of information, to promote free discussion on major current economic issues and facilitate meetings between world leaders.

The Forum brings together more than 1,400 people from across the globe, every year.

== History ==
The first Forum was presented in 2011 and was held in Palm Beach, Florida, until 2014. The subsequent editions, as of 2015, are held in Miami, Florida.

== Notable speakers ==
See source

- Shaukat Aziz, Prime Minister of Pakistan (2004-2007)
- Willem Buiter, global chief economist, Citi
- Amadou Diallo, chief executive officer, DHL Freight
- Thomas J. Donohue, president and chief executive officer, United States Chamber of Commerce (USCC)
- Jean-Louis Ekra, chairman and president, African Export-Import Bank
- Hage Geingob, Prime Minister of Namibia
- Fred Hochberg, chairman and president, Export-Import Bank of the United States (Ex-Im Bank)
- Michael Horodniceanu, president, MTA Capital Construction
- José Miguel Insulza, secretary general, Organization of American States (OAS)
- Salvador Namburete, Minister of Energy, Mozambique
- Rick Perry, governor, State of Texas, United States of America
- Robert L. Reynolds, president and chief executive officer, Putnam Investments
- Rick Scott, governor, State of Florida, United States of America
- Strobe Talbott, president, Brookings
- Julio Velarde, governor, Central Bank of Peru

== Advisory board ==
=== Chair ===
- Eduardo J. Padrón, President, Miami Dade College

=== Members ===
Current members of the Advisory Board of the World Strategic Forum are:

- Steven Cernak, Chief Executive Officer & Port Director, Port Everglades
- Michael Ferris, Chief Executive Officer Abacode Cybersecurity Experts
- Rebeca Grynspan, Secretary General, Ibero American Conference SEGIB
- Frank Holder, Managing Director & Head of Latin America Berkeley Research Group
- Juan M. Kuryla, Director and Chief Executive Officer, PortMiami
- Karl Sestak, Chief of Staff, Carnival Cruise Line
- Alvin West, CFO & SVP Finance, GMCVB

== See also ==
- International Economic Forum of the Americas
- Conference of Montreal
- Toronto Global Forum
