= Marc Rémillard =

- Origin: Quebec City, Canada
- Genres: House; Electro; French Touch; Trash; Dubstep; Bass music
- Years active: 2007-present
- Labels: Trouble And Bass (NYC); So French Records (France); Royal Fetish Recordings (Denmark); Gato Negro Music (Argentina); Simma Records(UK); Heavy Artillery(US); Play Me Records (US)

Marc Rémillard is a former French-Canadian electronic music artist, now music producer, sound engineer, storm chaser, guitarist and video game developer.

== History ==
Logo

Marc Rémillard began work as a musician in Quebec City in 2007.

In 2010, after moving to Montreal, Rémillard started managing Royal Fetish Recordings.

From 2010 to 2016, Rémillard released music under his name and under the name OUTBRK and performed music in Canada, United States, and Europe. He shared the stage with some of the world's biggest names, such as Skrillex, Major Lazer, Zedd, Pendulum, and many others.

2016 marked the ending of Remillard's relationship with Electronic Dance Music. He has since then been working as a mixer, composer, producer and sound designer in Montreal. In 2020, Remillard produced the debut solo album Blue for rapper and singer Emma Beko, part of the duo Heartstreets.

== Discography ==
=== Singles ===
- Pimp Hand Strong with Messinian and Frederik Olufsen (Play Me Records)
- Mother Sucker, with Frederik Olufsen - 2011 (BugEyed Records)
- Downtown - 2010. (Trouble & Bass)
- Baby It's You - 2010.

=== EPs ===
- Get Glitched - 2008 (Gato Negro Music).
- Feeling Fresh - 2009 (So French Records).
- Jurassic - 2010 (Royal Fetish Recordings).
- Jungle Knockout - 2011 (Simma)
- Aftermath - 2013 (Heavy Artillery Recordings)
- United - 2013 (Heavy Artillery Recordings)

=== Remixes by Marc Remillard ===
- "Lead the Galaxy" by Deluce, 2008.
- "Distant Lovers" by Louis La Roche, 2009.
- "Temple" by The Noizy Kidz, 2009.
- "Blisters" by Ravage! Ravage!, 2009.
- "Talkin' About" by Dee, 2009.
- "Playing into Cosmos" by SUPER PIXEL!, 2009.
- "Until We Meet Again" by Emma-Lee, 2009.
- "Stalingrad" by Tenkah, 2009.
- "Vague" by We Are Wolves, 2010.
- "Sunday 86" by Ahllex, 2010.
- "We Will Never" by Press Play On Me, 2010.
- "Nightcall" by Kavinsky, 2010.
- "Wild Birds" by Minitel Rose, 2010

== Storm chasing ==
Since 2007, Rémillard has been storm chasing in Canada and in the United States. He joined Québec Vortex in 2008 and is now a shareholder in the company that now works with Hydro Météo for severe weather forecasting and monitoring in the Province of Quebec. Rémillard appears on TV, radio, and other medias regularly for interviews about storm chasing and severe weather events.

== Game development ==
OUTBRK is a multiplayer storm chasing simulation game being developed for PC, set in a fictive, 625 km^{2} reproduction of America’s Tornado Alley. The game uses real life weather data (modeled) from the past which are processed into scenarios, which are randomly selected each time a chase is set up. Thus, storms in-game act very similar to real life storms, including supercells, derechos, and squalls. Players chase storms to earn points, which can be used to buy, upgrade, and customize vehicles and their character. From 24 February to 24 March 2020, a Kickstarter campaign for the game successfully raised $36,000 CAD ($28,843 USD). The game was released on Steam on June 28, 2024 to mostly positive reviews. As of July 28, fairly regular updates have been published, with more along the way.
