= Toronto Global Forum =

- Organized by: International Economic Forum of the Americas
- Type: International Conference
- Frequency: Annually
- Founded: 2007
- Founded by: Nicholas Rémillard
- Location: Toronto, Ontario, Canada
- Topics: Finance; Trade; Innovation; Energy; Infrastructure; Commodities
- Next Event: October 15–17, 2025
- Sister Organizations: Conference of Montreal; World Strategic Forum; The Conference of Paris
- Website: forum-americas.org/toronto

The Toronto Global Forum (TGF) is an annual economic event organized by the International Economic Forum of the Americas since 2007.

== Mission ==
The Toronto Global Forum is a not-for-profit organization presenting annual conferences on national and global economic issues. The TGF mission is to promote open debate and dialogues on national and international issues. Each year, the event welcomes heads of state, Fortune 500 CEOs, international organizations, central bank governors, global economic decision makers and civil society representatives, etc. to foster free discussion between world leaders. The forum brings together more than 2,800 people from across the globe every year.

The forum also provide a platform to facilitate meetings between key world leaders in order to encourage global discourse.

An additional goal of the forum is to provide opportunities for business meetings aimed at promoting partnerships among major Canadian and international corporations. In 2017 there were panel discussions dedicated to Canada's business advantages.

The International Economic Forum of the Americas hosts two other annual events: the Conference of Montreal (founded in 1995), as well as the World Strategic Forum, held in Miami (founded in 2011).

== Notable speakers ==
- Navdeep Bains, Canadian Minister of Innovation, Science and Economic Development
- Dominic Barton, global managing director, McKinsey & Company
- Mark Carney, Governor, Bank of England
- Ian Bremmer, President and Founder, Eurasia Group; and Editor-at-Large, TIME Magazine
- Dick Cheney, Vice President of the United States of America (2001-2009)
- Christophe Frei, Secretary-General, World Energy Council (WEC)
- Shuman Ghosemajumder, former click fraud czar, Google
- Moya Greene, CEO, Royal Mail
- Alan Greenspan, 13th Chairman, Federal Reserve Bank of the United States (1987-2006)
- José Ángel Gurría, secretary-general, OECD
- Douglas M. Hodge, chief executive officer, PIMCO
- Joseph L. Hooley, chairman and chief executive officer, State Street Corporation
- Josu Jon Imaz, Chief Executive Officer Repsol
- Daniel Johnston, Governor General of Canada
- Jim Yong Kim, President, The World Bank
- Henry Kissinger, United States Secretary of State (1973-1977)
- Isabelle Kocher, Chief Executive Officer, ENGIE
- Christine Lagarde, Managing Director, International Monetary Fund
- Haruhiko Kuroda, 31st Governor, Bank of Japan
- Joanne Liu, International President, Doctor Without Borders (MSF)
- Luis Alberto Moreno, President, Inter-American Development Bank
- Lucas Papademos, Prime Minister of Greece (2011-2012), former governor of Central Bank of Greece, and former vice-president of the European Central Bank
- Luis Guillermo Solís Rivera, President of the Republic of Costa Rica
- Joseph Stiglitz, Nobel Memorial Prize laureate in Economics
- Paul Taylor, president and chief executive officer, Fitch Ratings
- Robert James Thomson, chief executive, News Corp
- Jean-Claude Trichet, former president, European Central Bank (ECB)
- German Vargas Lleras, Vice President of Colombia (2014-2017)
- Donald J. Walker, chief executive officer, Magna International
- Martin Wolf, chief economics commentator, Financial Times
- Fareed Zakaria, host, CNN's Fareed Zakaria GPS

== Advisory board ==
=== Chairman ===
- John M. Beck, Aecon Group Inc.

=== Members ===
Current members of the advisory board of the Toronto Global Forum are:

- Dominic Barton, global managing director, McKinsey & Company Show
- Laurence Batlle, chief executive officer, RATP Dev
- Christiane Bergevin, president, Bergevin Capital and chair of the board, Canadian Chamber of Commerce
- Janet De Silva, Toronto Region Board of Trade
- Benoit Parent, vice-president, power generation business and nuclear operations, Cummins Sales and Service
- Nicholas Rémillard, president and chief executive officer, International Economic Forum of the Americas
- Gregory Smith, president and chief executive officer, InstarAGF Asset Management; and executive chairman, Nieuport Aviation Infrastructure Partners
- Kenneth Tanenbaum, chairman, Kilmer Developments; and vice-chairman, Kilmer Van Nostrand (KVN)
- Michael Thompson, councillor and chair, Economic Development and Culture Committee, City of Toronto government; and chair, Invest Toronto
- Geoffrey A. Wilson, president and chief executive officer, PortsToronto
- Michael Wilson, chairman, Barclays Capital; former minister of finance of Canada, Canada; and former Canadian ambassador to the United States
- Paul Zed, secretary to the Toronto Global Forum advisory board

== See also ==
- International Economic Forum of the Americas
- Conference of Montreal
- World Strategic Forum
