= Bruno N Rémillard =

Canadian mathematician

- Born: July 7, 1961 (age 65); Saint-Raphaël, Quebec, Canada
- Education: PhD, Carleton University
- Scientific career
- Fields: Probability, Statistics, and Time Series
- Doctoral advisor: Donald A. Dawson

Bruno N Rémillard (born July 7, 1961) is a Canadian mathematical statistician and an honorary professor at HEC Montréal. He is the 2019 Gold Medalist of the Statistical Society of Canada and was inducted as a 2019 Fellow of the Institute of Mathematical Statistics. Rémillard was President of the Statistical Society of Canada in 2022-23.

== Biography ==
Rémillard was born in Saint-Raphaël, Quebec, Canada. He received a BSc and a MSc in mathematics from Université Laval in 1983 and 1985 and two years later a PhD in probability at Carleton University under the supervision of Donald A. Dawson. His dissertation was entitled "Large deviations and laws of the iterated logarithm for multidimensional diffusion processes with applications to diffusion processes with random coefficients." and earned him the Pierre-Robillard Award from the Statistical Society of Canada that recognizes the best PhD thesis defended in the relevant fields at a Canadian university in a given year. After working as an NSERC postdoctoral fellow at Cornell University, Rémillard joined the Université du Québec à Trois-Rivières in 1988. He was promoted to the rank of Associate in 1992 and became full professor in 1996. He settled at HEC Montréal in 2001.

== Publications ==
Rémillard has authored over 85 published papers, mostly in high-caliber international journals, in the fields of probability, statistics, and time series modelling. He has co-authored with Christian Genest nearly 20 papers in The Annals of Probability, The Annals of Statistics, Bernoulli, Biometrika, Journal of the American Statistical Association, Journal of Multivariate Analysis, etc. He is one of the 23 scientists to have published in the four IMS Annals. He is the author of a graduate monograph and co-authored of three other books, including two undergraduate textbooks:

- Corina Reischer, Raymond Leblanc, Bruno Rémillard, and Denis Larocque, Théorie des probabilités: Problèmes et solutions., Presses de l'Université du Québec, Montréal, Canada, 2002
- Pierre Duchesne and Bruno Rémillard, Statistical modeling and analysis for complex data problems, GERAD 25th Anniversary Series, Springer: New York, 2005
- Pierre Del Moral, Bruno Rémillard, and Sylvain Rubenthaler, Une introduction aux probabilités, Éditions Ellipses, 2006
- B. Rémillard, Statistical methods for financial engineering, Chapman and Hall/CRC, 2013.

== Awards and honors ==
- Statistical Society of Canada Pierre-Robillard Award 1988
- Elected Member of the International Statistical Institute 2000
- Best Paper Award Canadian Journal of Statistics 2003
- Pierre Laurin Award for Excellence in Research 2007
- Roger Charbonneau Award 2013
- Best Paper Award Econometrics
- Statistical Society of Canada Gold Medalist 2019
- Fellow of the Institute of Mathematical Statistics 2019
