= Carolands =

Historic house in California, United States

Carolands Chateau
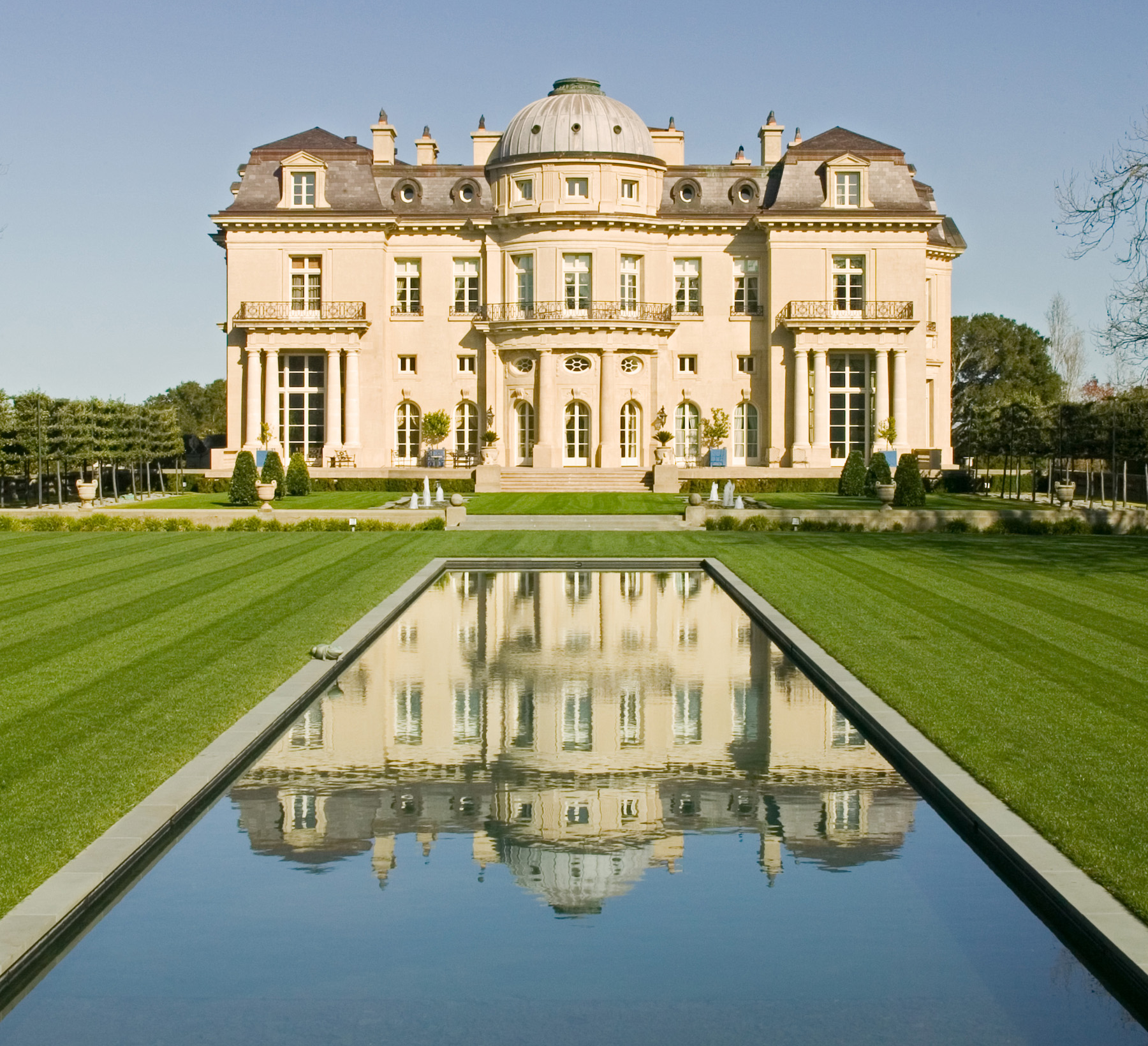
- West façade, 2006

- Location within San Francisco Bay Area Location within California Location within the United States
- Alternative names: Carolands, Remillard Manor, The Chateau
- Etymology: Harriett Pullman Carolan

General information
- Architectural style: Beaux-Arts Classicism
- Location: 565 Remillard, Hillsborough, California, United States
- Coordinates: 37°33′19.8″N 122°22′14.7″W
- Groundbreaking: 1914
- Completed: 1916
- Renovated: 1998–2002
- Cost: est. US$1,000,000 (equivalent to $31,825,658 in 2025)
- Renovation cost: est. US$20,000,000 (equivalent to $35,800,185 in 2025)
- Owner: Harriett Pullman Carolan (1915–1945); Tomlinson Moseley (1945–1948); Mrs. S. Coe Robinson (1948–1950); Lillian Remillard Dandini (1950–1973); Selwyn McCabe (1976–1976); Rose 'Roz' Franks (1976–1979?); George Benny (1979?–1982?); Michael DeDomenico (1986–1994?); Raymond Hung (1994–1997); Kevin White (1997–1998); Charles and Ann Johnson (1998–2012); Carolands Foundation (2012–present)

Height
- Height: 100 feet (30 m)

Dimensions
- Other dimensions: 130 feet (40 m) x 120 feet (37 m)

Design and construction
- Architects: Ernest Sanson (design); Willis Polk (construction); Achille Duchêne (landscape)

Renovating team
- Renovating firm: Doug Wilson
- Other designers: Mario Buatta

Other information
- Number of rooms: 98

Website
- carolands.org
- Carolands
- U.S. National Register of Historic Places
- California Historical Landmark
- NRHP reference No.: 75000478
- CHISL No.: 886

Significant dates
- Added to NRHP: October 21, 1975
- Designated CHISL: May 9, 1975

Carolands Chateau is a 46,050-square-foot (4,278 m^{2}), 4.5 floor, 98 room mansion on 5.83 acres (2.36 ha) in Hillsborough, California, United States. An example of American Renaissance and Beaux-Arts design, the building is a California Historical Landmark and is listed on the National Register of Historic Places. Carolands is one of the last of the houses built during the Gilded Age, a period of great mansion-building that included famous houses of the Vanderbilt family, such as Marble House, Biltmore Estate and The Breakers, and stately California houses such as Filoli and the Huntington family's mansions.

== History ==
=== Harriett Pullman Carolan ===
The woman who built Carolands, Harriett Pullman Carolan (1869–1956), was the daughter of George Pullman, a 19th-century industrialist, one of Chicago's wealthiest men, and founder of the Pullman Company, famous for its Palace railway cars. In Chicago in 1892, Harriett Pullman married Francis Carolan of San Francisco and moved with him to California. In 1912, she acquired 554 acres (224 ha) of land in Hillsborough, on which she intended to build a house and garden that would excite "the wonder and admiration of America" and reflect her many refined and cultivated interests. The result was a masterpiece of Beaux-Arts architecture, inspired by the court architecture of Louis XIV. Carolan chose the site, the highest in the neighborhood, for its commanding views of the San Francisco Bay and the surrounding hills.

=== Architects ===
Harriett Carolan commissioned plans for the chateau from the Parisian architect Ernest Sanson, at the time France's foremost designer of prestigious private houses. Sanson was a classicist, and his design for the chateau's exterior was inspired by the 17th-century designs of François Mansart. He was seventy-six years old, near the end of a long and distinguished career, and never visited the California site. Carolan engaged the San Francisco-based Willis Polk, a distinguished architect in his own right, to be the structural designer and construction manager, instructing him to faithfully execute Sanson's designs.

France's leading landscape architect, Achille Duchêne, designed Carolands' gardens. Duchêne's work was inspired by the works of the great 17th-century landscape designer André Le Nôtre, whose most famous creations included the gardens at the Palace of Versailles, Vaux-le-Vicomte and the Jardins des Tuileries. In his original, ambitious design for Carolands, Duchêne planned miles of roadways leading across extensive grounds, landscaped with thousands of shrubs and trees, accented by fountains and statuary. Only a small portion of the scheme was ever built.

=== Construction ===
Soon after Harriett Carolan secured the land in 1912, Duchêne arrived in San Francisco to lay out the grand parterre gardens. In late 1913, Ernest Sanson began to design the house. His plans included a dry moat around two sides of the house, discreetly located to provide light and air, and access, to the service spaces in the basement, while not blocking views of the gardens from the principal rooms on the main floor. In his design, Sanson incorporated three 18th-century period rooms that Carolan had purchased in Paris with the advice of the famous antique dealer Boni de Castellane.

In 1914, Willis Polk began grading the great terraces planned by Duchêne, sending progress photographs to the owner and her architects. Polk began to build the reinforced concrete superstructure he had designed, creating the infill walls with brick, finishing them with concrete stucco, sanded and scored to resemble natural limestone.

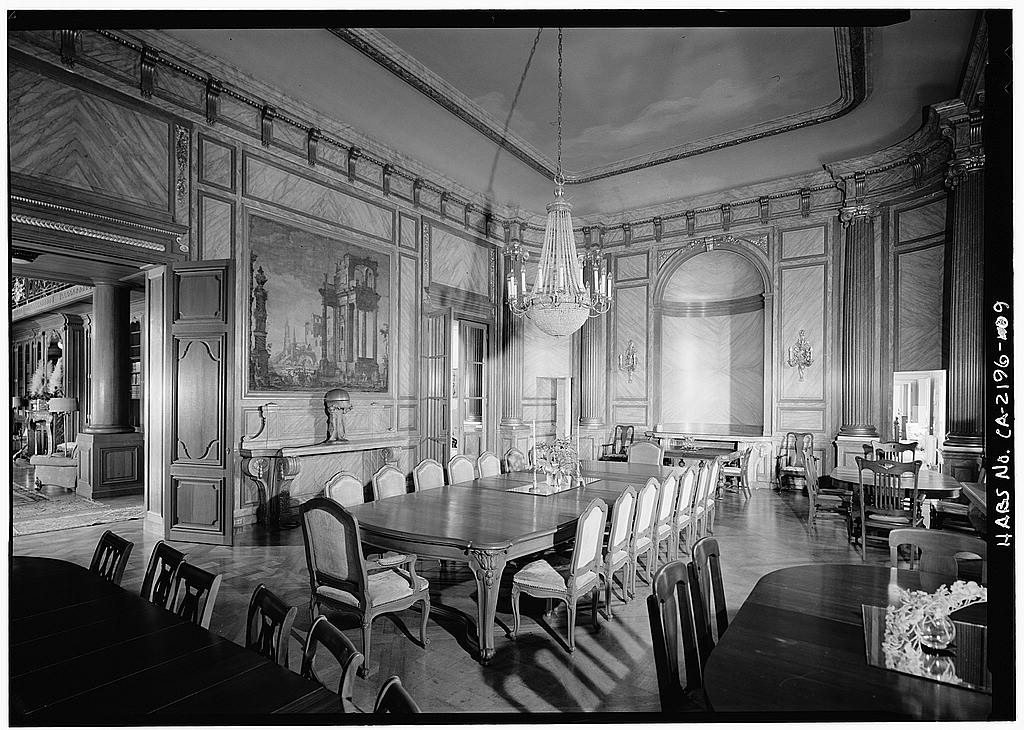
The Dining Room, photographed by Jack E. Boucher for HABS in August 1974

In mid-1916, the elaborate interior elements began arriving on the site. The house as completed had ninety-eight rooms, including nine bedrooms and baths for the owners and their guests, each with an antechamber to guarantee quiet and privacy. The service spaces were equally elaborate: a kitchen with walls and ceiling made of white glass tiles; a service elevator connecting all floors; and a butler's pantry and mezzanine with walls of Delftware tile. In the fall of 1916, Harriett and Frank Carolan moved in with their staff.

=== First decline ===
Harriett Carolan did not use her house for long: she separated from Frank Carolan in 1917 and closed the chateau the following year. After the separation, she moved to New York City, while Frank remained in California where he died in 1923. Two years later, Harriett married Col. Arthur Schermerhorn, and while the couple occasionally occupied Carolands, in 1928 Harriett removed her furniture and put the property up for sale.

The U.S. Government considered buying Carolands to use as a Western White House in 1939, and again during the Kennedy administration, but both times declined to purchase.

In 1945, Tomlinson Moseley bought the house and surrounding 550 acres (2.2 km^{2}) from the Schermerhorns and began to sub-divide the land and build additional houses. In 1947, Life Magazine published an article about a charity event held at the house, the first opportunity for San Francisco-area residents to see its interior. According to the article, the house had been abandoned for twenty-five years, so that plumbing for the event had to be provided by a fire hose, and lighting required the use of portable generators and flood lights.

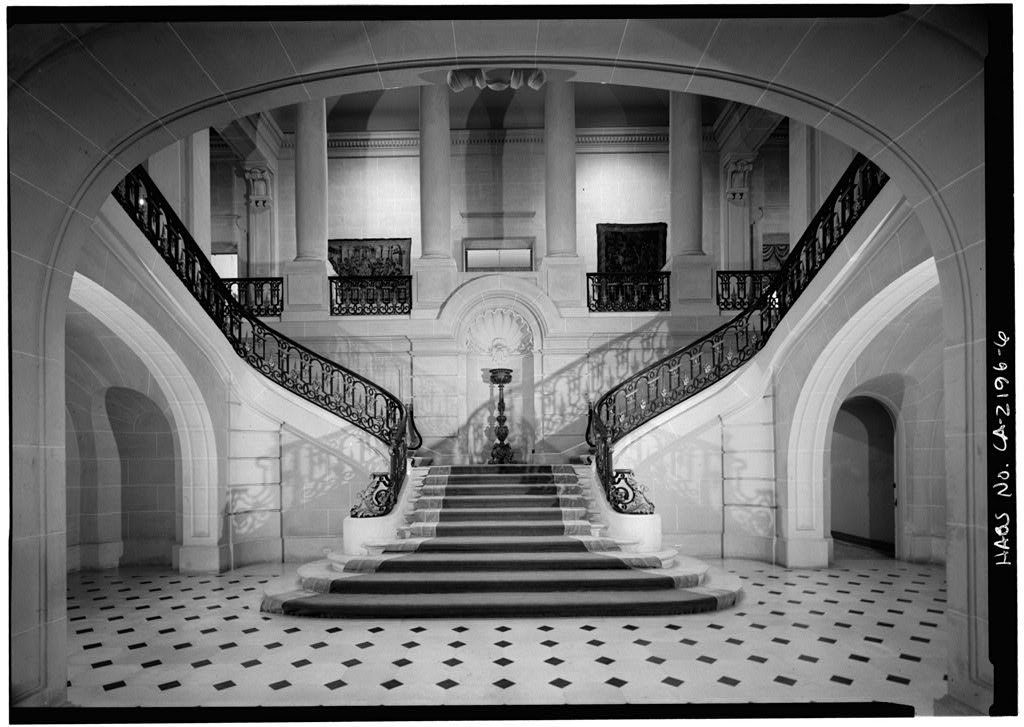
Grand Staircase (from first level), by Boucher for HABS in Aug 1974

In 1948, Moseley sold the property, by then reduced to 25 acres (10 ha), to Mrs. S. Coe Robinson. By 1950, she had carved off much of the remaining land into smaller parcels and begun to contemplate demolishing the house.

=== Countess Lillian Remillard Dandini ===
Countess Lillian Remillard Dandini purchased Carolands Chateau in 1950, saving it from demolition by speculators interested in developing the land, and uninterested in the house's architectural significance. Prior to her marriage in 1932 to Mexican-born Count Alessandro Dandini di Cesena, Lillian Remillard was an heir to the Remillard Brothers fortune, which derived from a brick manufacturing business dating back to California's gold rush, a business that benefitted greatly from the construction boom following the 1906 earthquake. During the twenty-three years (until her death) that she lived at Carolands, the countess entertained often and made the house available for numerous charity benefits. She frequently invited San Francisco's French community to the house and opened it annually to the San Francisco Bay area's French students. Her generosity in sharing the house inspired the Town of Burlingame to give her the town's "Woman of the Year" award.

In her later years the Countess Dandini lacked the necessary funds to maintain the house, and after she died in 1973 it was once again at risk of demolition. The countess willed the house and the remaining 5.83 acres (23,600 m^{2}) to the Town of Hillsborough to be used as a French and Italian musical, artistic and literary center, but was unable to include an endowment. The Town of Hillsborough declined the gift, ruling the proposed use inconsistent with the town's charter while noting it could not afford to pay the cost to maintain the property.

=== Years of decline ===
In 1975, the house was added to the list of California Historical Landmarks (CHL #886), and to the National Register of Historic Places (NRHP #75000478). Nevertheless, Carolands suffered from frequent changes in ownership after Countess Dandini's death.

In 1976, Dr. Selwyn McCabe won the house in a probate auction, but declined to purchase, deferring to the next bidder, Rose 'Roz' Franks. In 1979, Franks lost the house to George I. Benny, who in turn lost it to foreclosure in 1982, after conviction for conspiring to defraud institutional lenders. At the time, adult filmmakers gained access to the site where they produced the 1982 film All American Girls.

During these years, Carolands was often vacant, and curious local high school students often entered the house. In 1985, David Allen Raley, a security guard, lured two high school students onto the property where he sexually assaulted and stabbed them, leaving them for dead in a ravine near San Jose. They managed to climb out of the ravine and flag down a passing motorist for help, but one later died of wounds received during the ordeal. Raley had bragged earlier that day that he often received bribes from curious students interested in the mansion's interior, but that "he only let girls in." He was convicted, and received the death penalty in 1988.

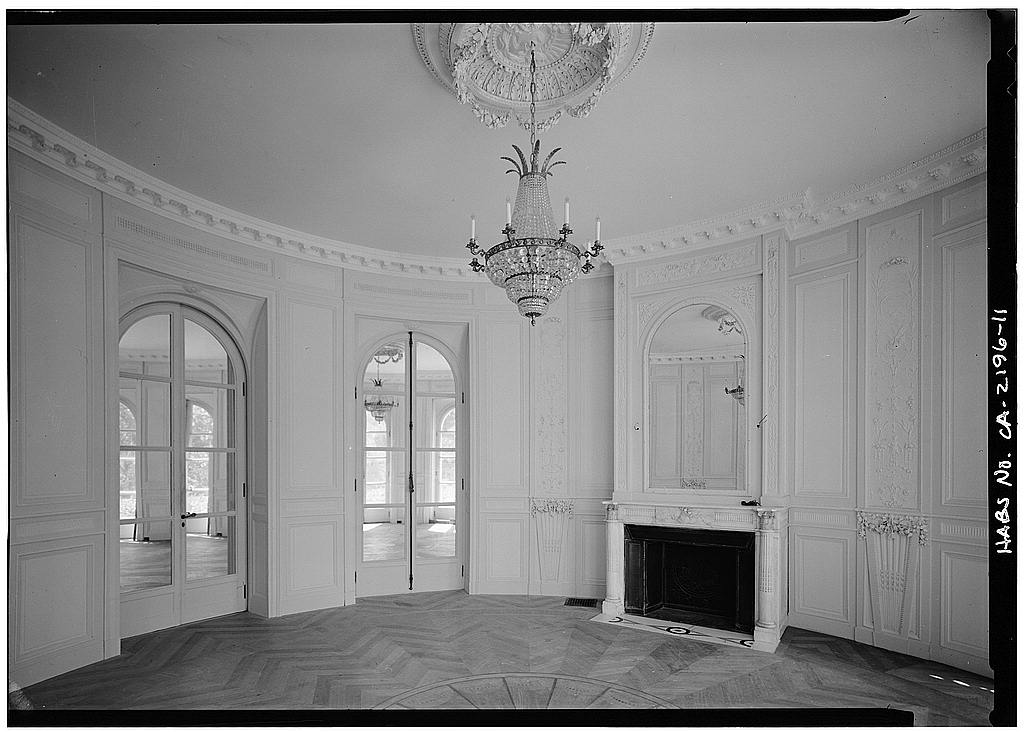
Bordeaux Salon. Photograph by Boucher for HABS in Aug 1974

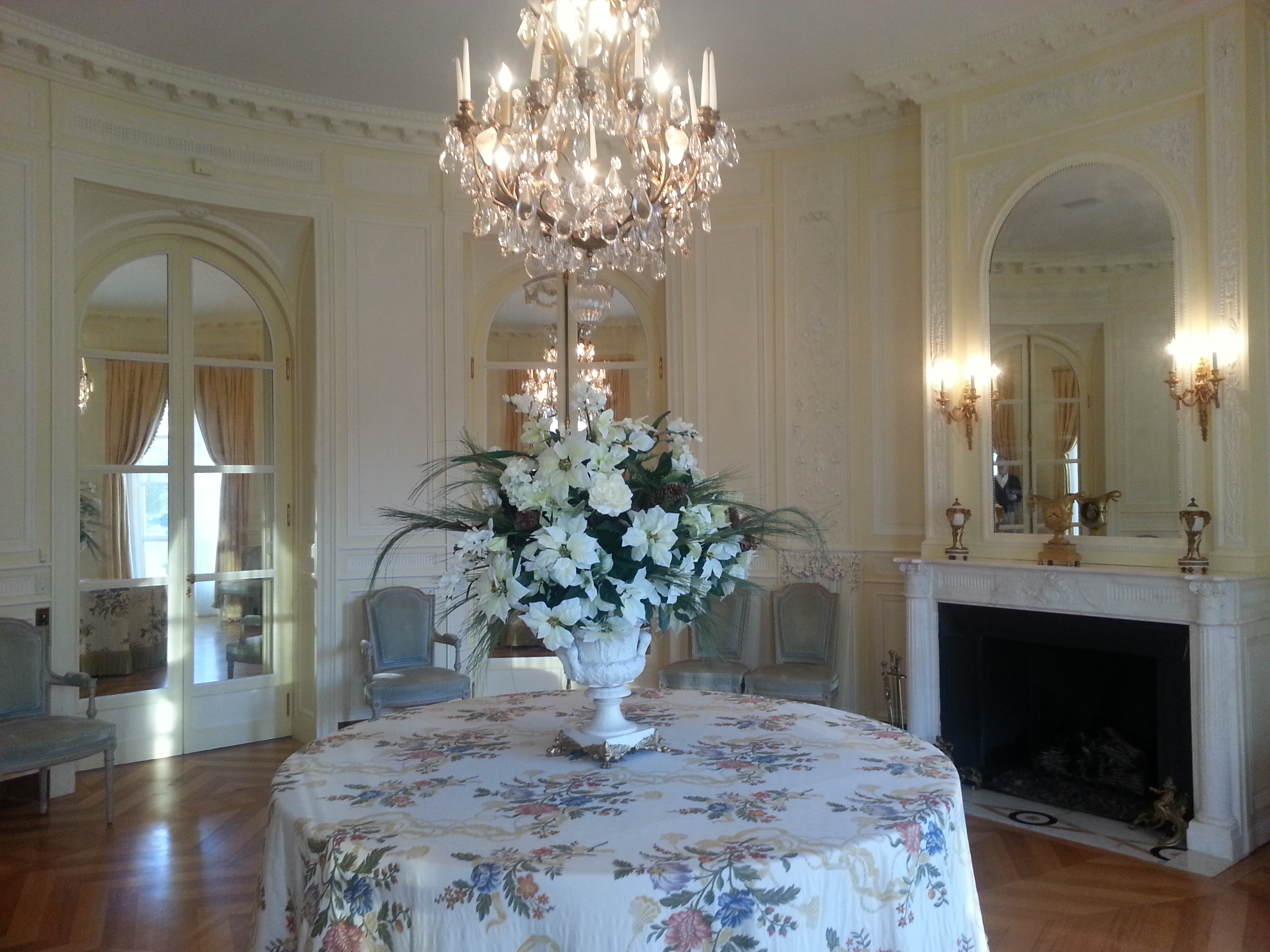
After 2013 restoration

In 1986, Michael DeDomenico, an heir to the family controlling Rice-A-Roni and Ghirardelli, bought Carolands, and that year developers commissioned an Environmental Impact Report in support of a proposal to further subdivide the land and build additional houses. In 1989, the house suffered superficial damage in the Loma Prieta earthquake leading its owners to consider demolishing it. In 1997, a new owner proposed carving the house into fifteen condominiums, but the Hillsborough town charter banned multi-family residences.

=== Restoration ===
In 1991, the Hillsborough Designer Showhouse was held at Carolands, attracting 68,000 visitors, each paying $20 admission, netting more than $1 million for the sponsoring charity and reviving interest in the house. Among the visitors were Dr. Ann Johnson, who would later buy Carolands, and her interior decorator, Mario Buatta, who would help her to restore it.

In 1998, Johnson and her husband, mutual fund billionaire Charles Bartlett Johnson, bought the house and the remaining land for under $6 million. The Johnsons undertook extensive renovations and restorations of the house, often hosting events there.

=== Current status ===
Billionaire businessman Charles B. Johnson and his wife bought the Carolands Chateau in 2009 for $26 million. By 2023, it was appraised at $130 million. In 2012, Johnson and his wife donated the Carolands Chateau to his private foundation, "Carolands Foundation". The couple filed for tax-exempt status for the mansion, as they said that the mansion would be open to self-guided public tours every weekday from 9–5. By valuing the mansion so highly and by obtaining tax-exempt status, the Johnsons collected more than $38 million in tax savings from the estate over five years. However, the mansion was not open to the public 40 hours per week or subject to self-guided tours. Rather, it was only open to a few dozen lottery winners who could access the mansion on a guided tour for two hours from 1PM on most Wednesdays. Tax and legal experts questioned the validity of the high appraisal for the mansion and the tax-exempt status of the estate.

== Gallery ==
=== Exteriors ===
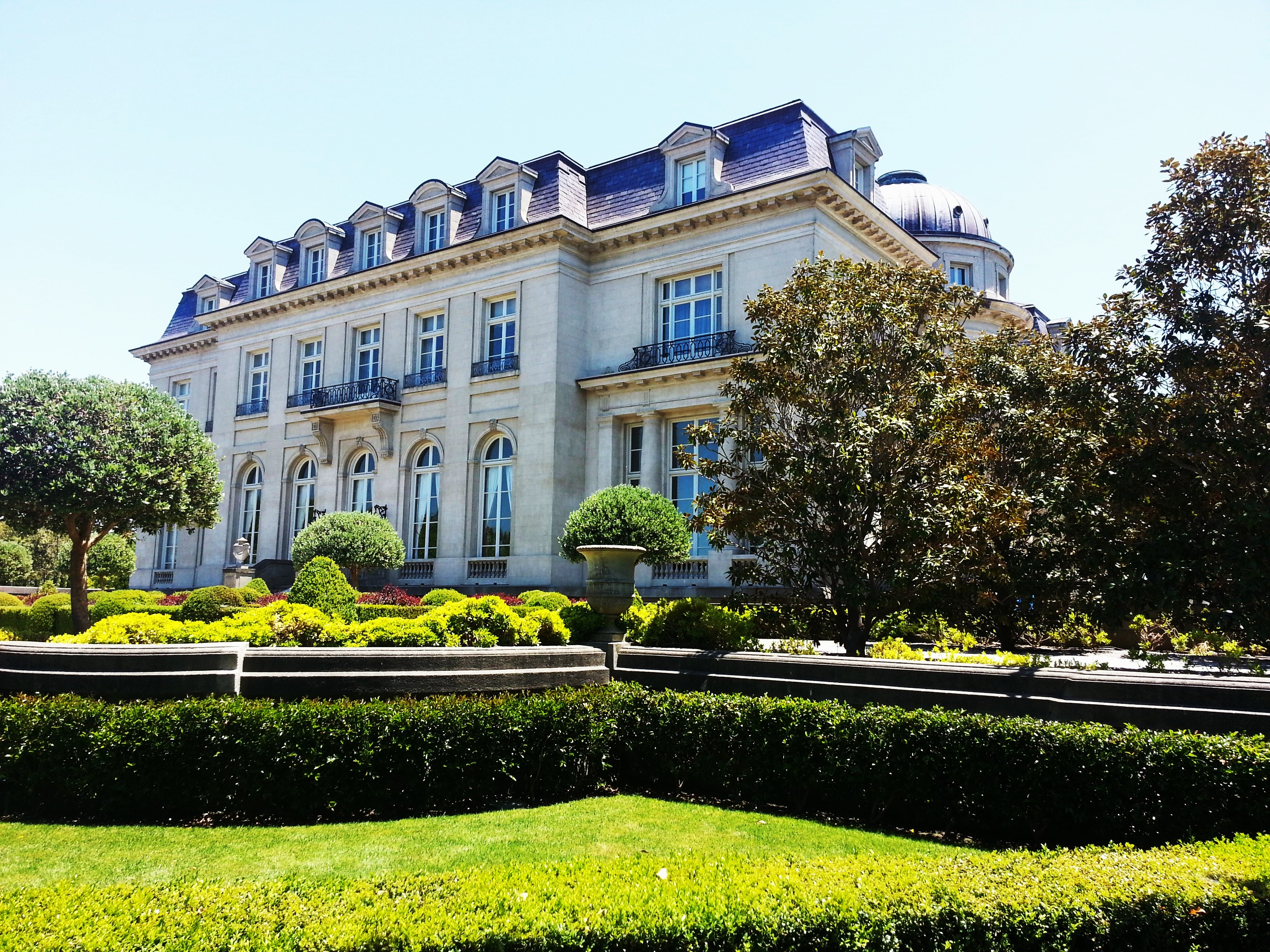
Carolands Chateau: North Façade showing the distinctive dome on the West Façade 2013

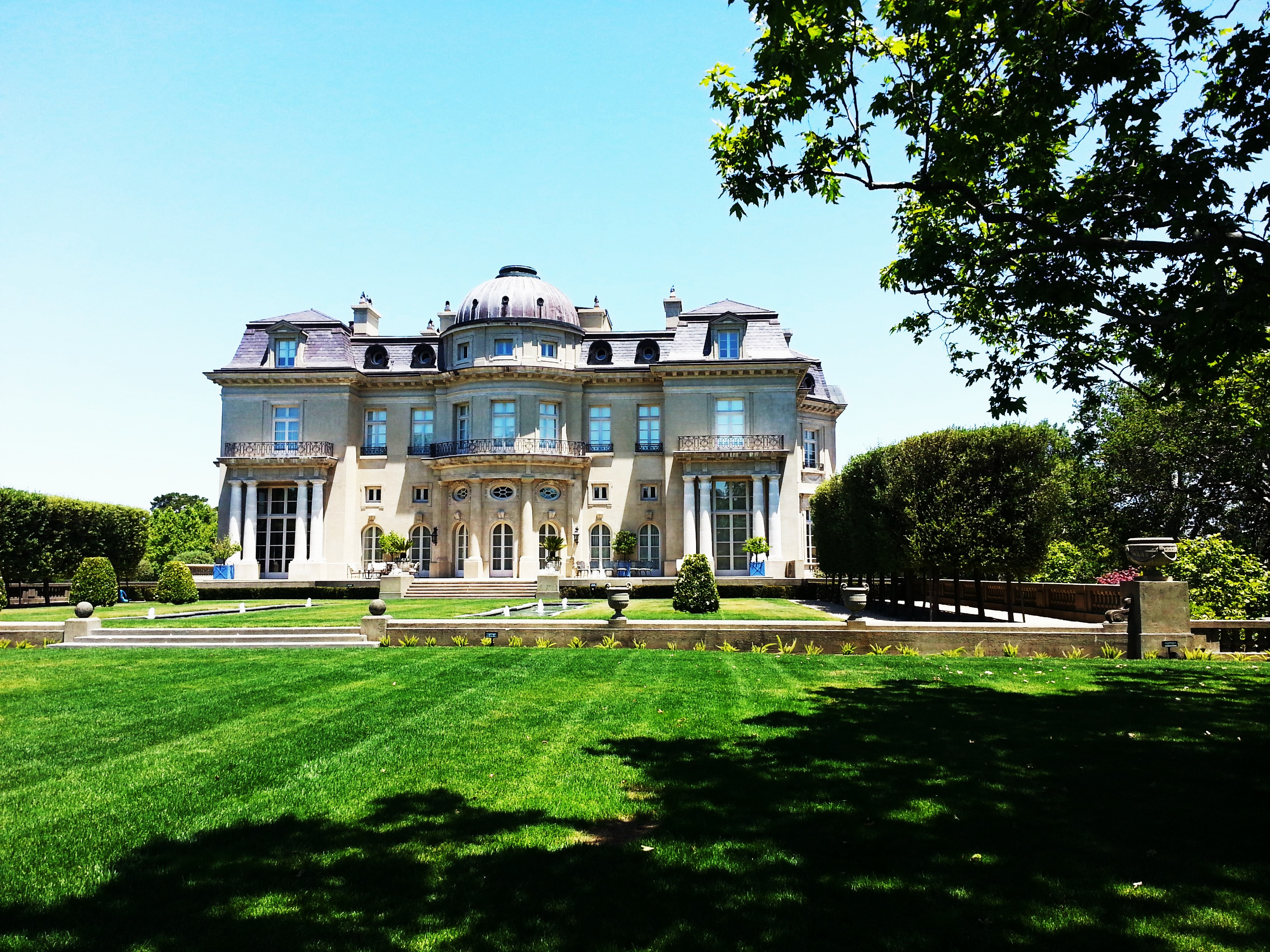
Carolands Chateau: West Façade from the gardens in the Morning Sun 2013

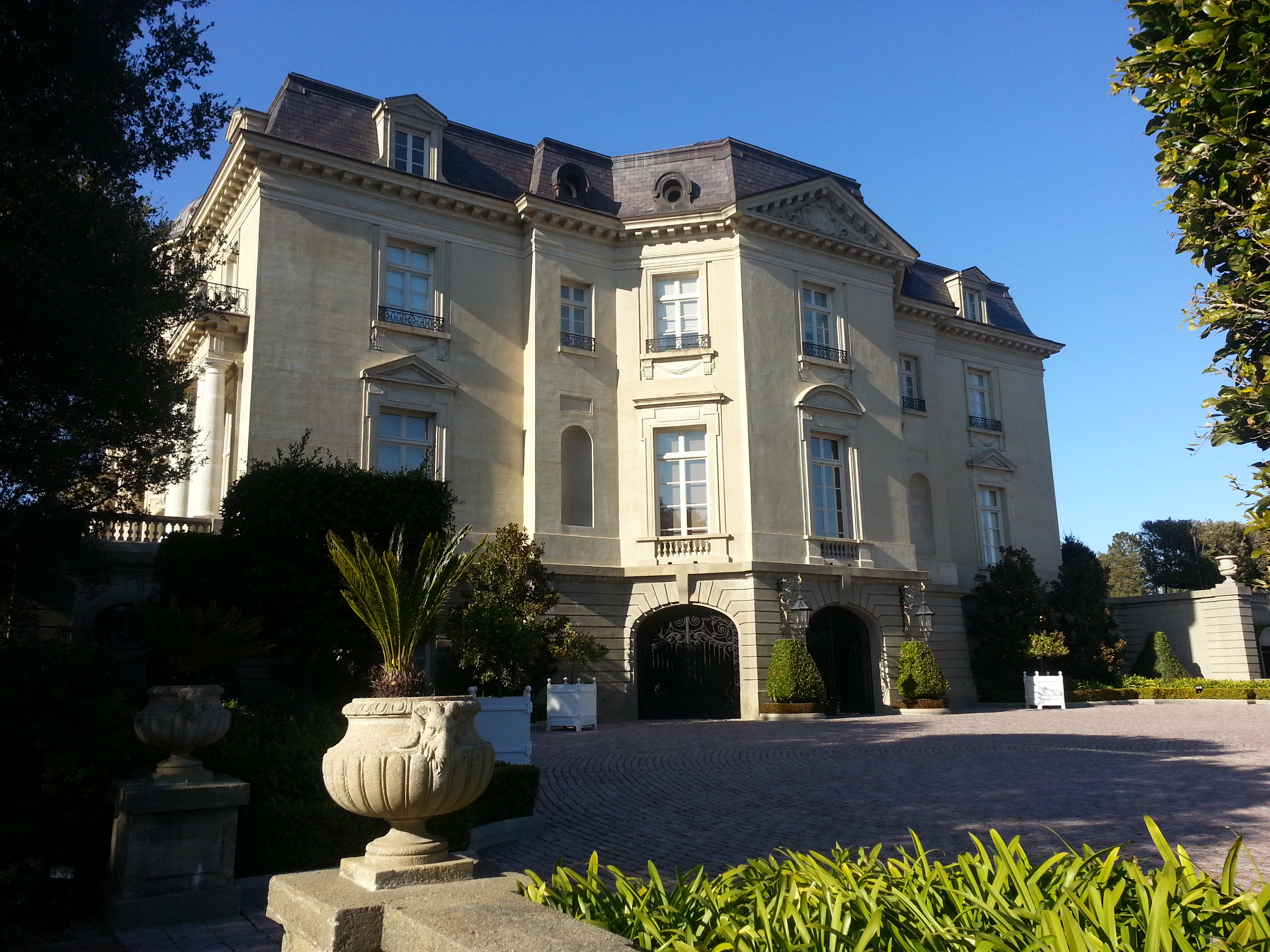
Carolands Chateau: South Façade with Porte-cochère gates 2013

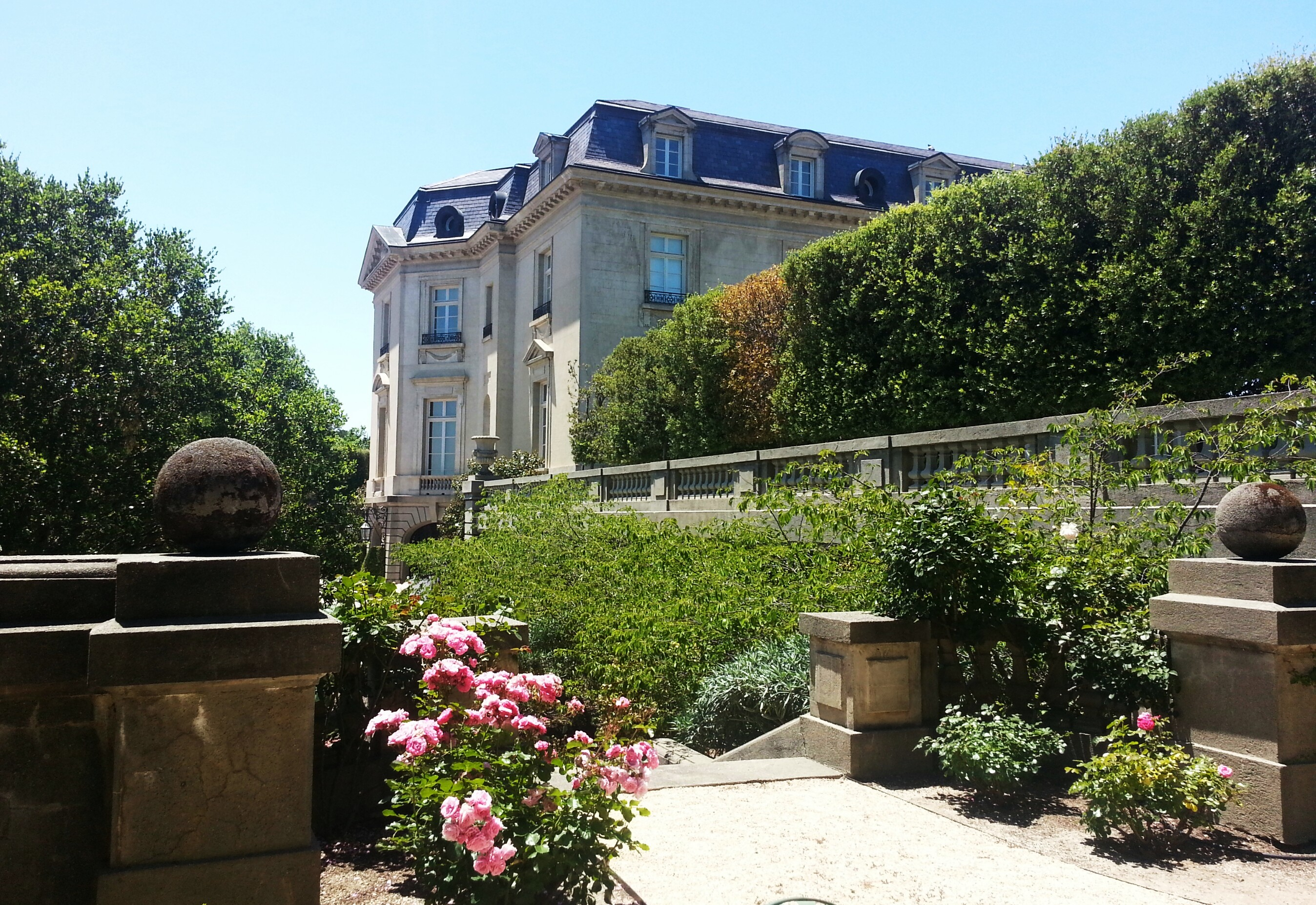
Carolands Chateau- from Rose Garden Terrace 2013

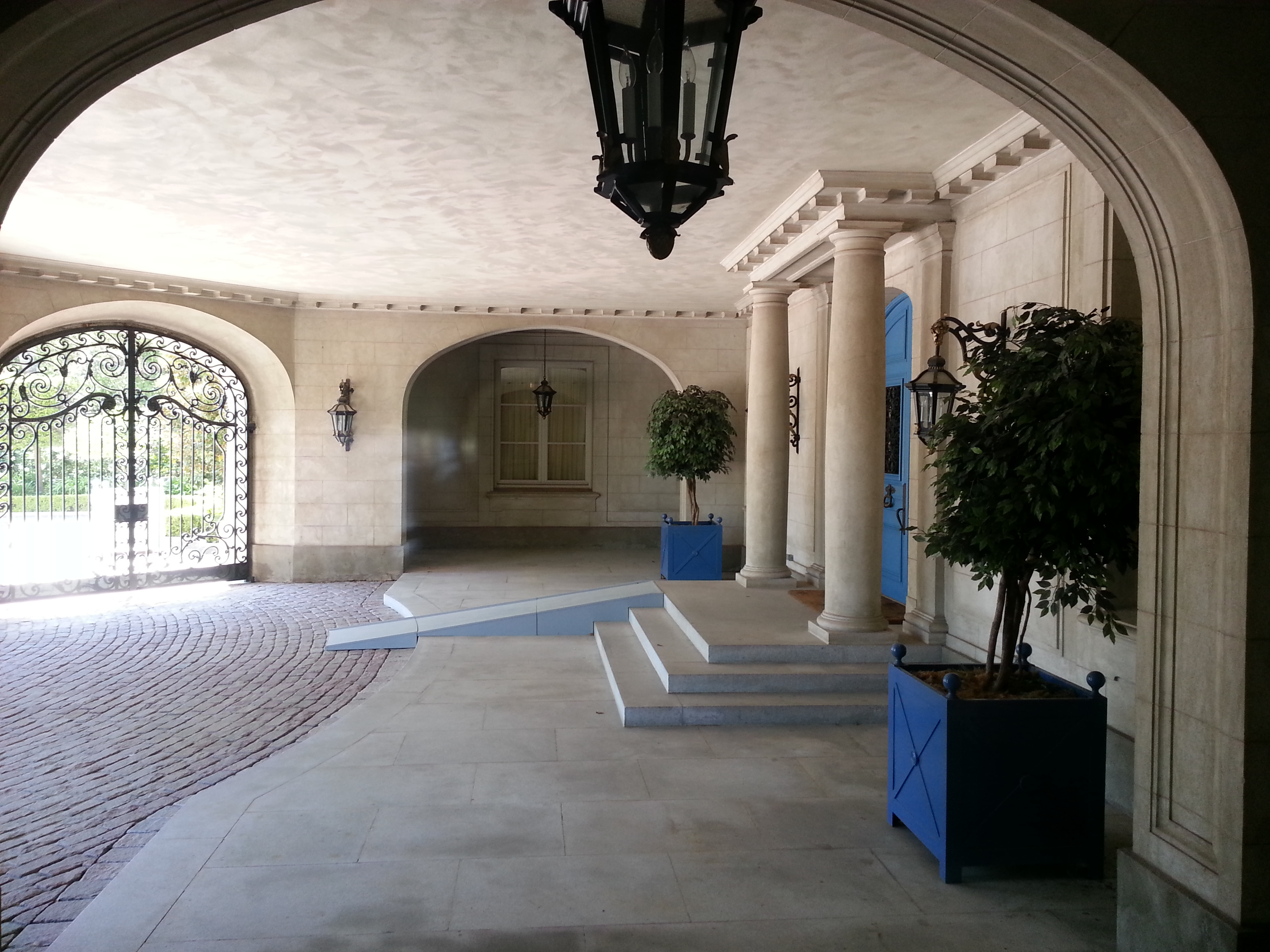
Carolands Chateau: Interior Porte-cochère

=== Gardens ===
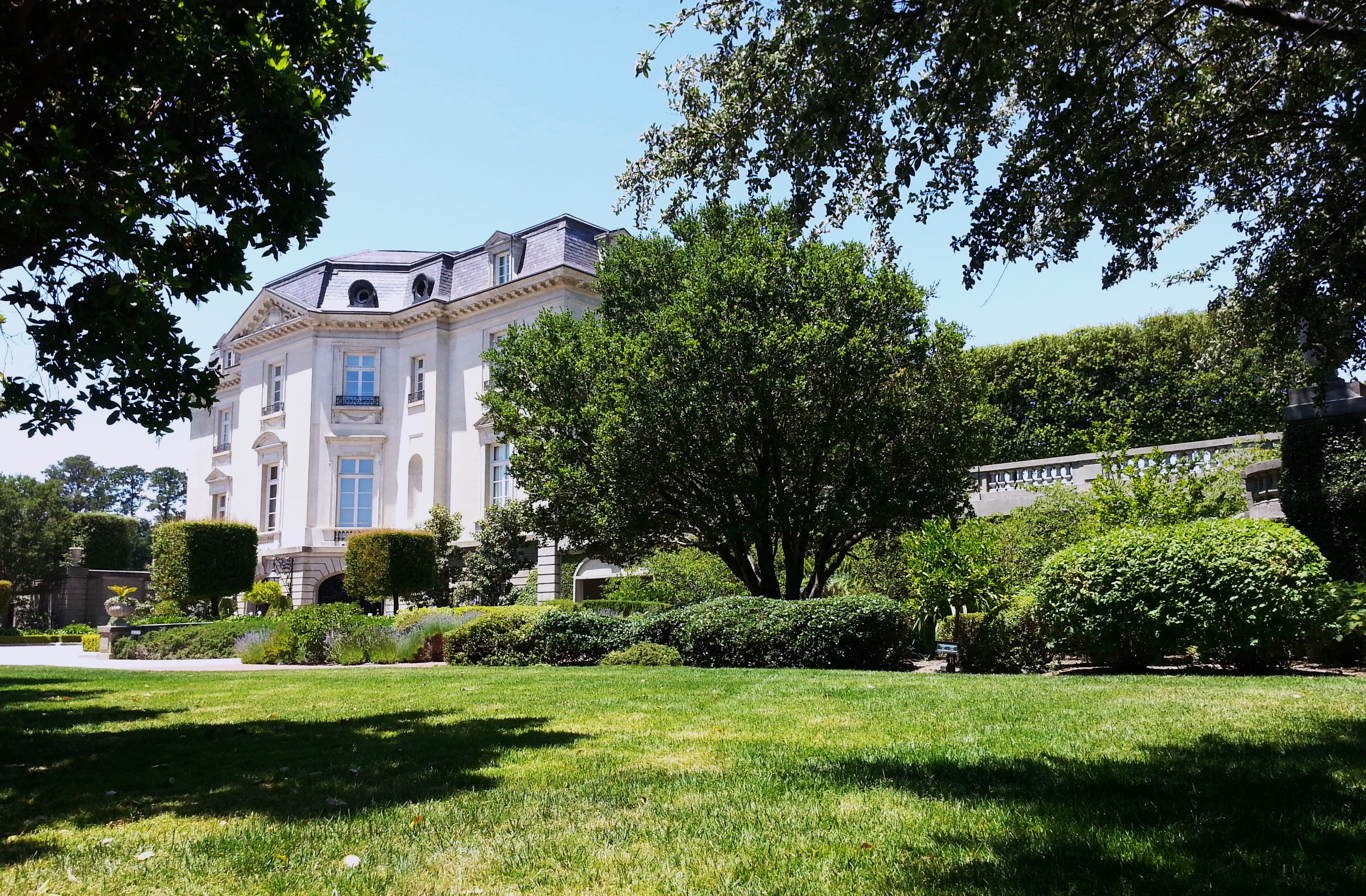
Carolands Chateau- South Front Garden view -2013

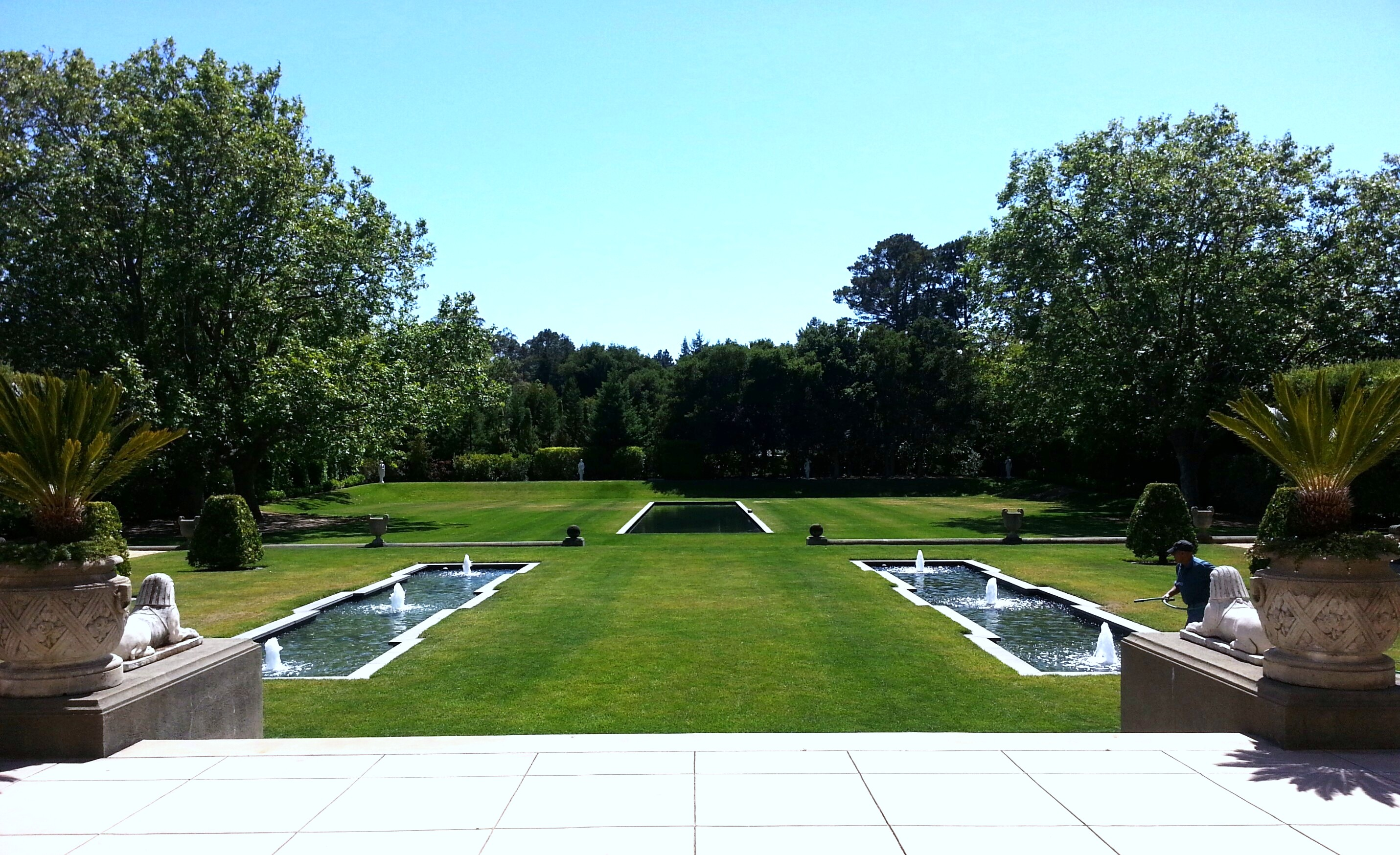
Carolands Chateau- Garden view West from Bordeaux Salon 2013

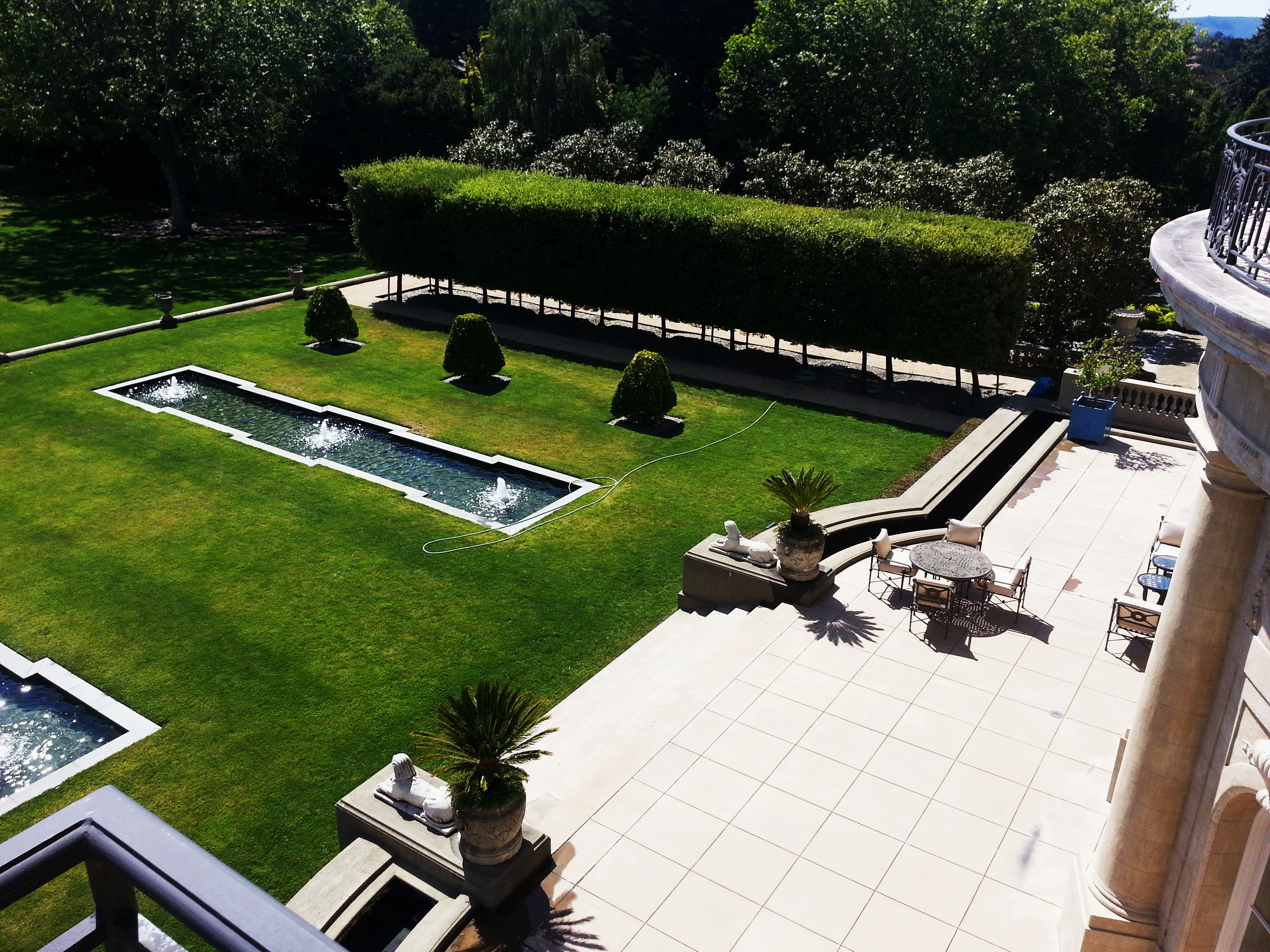
Carolands Chateau- West Garden and fountains from Harriett's Bedroom balcony 2013

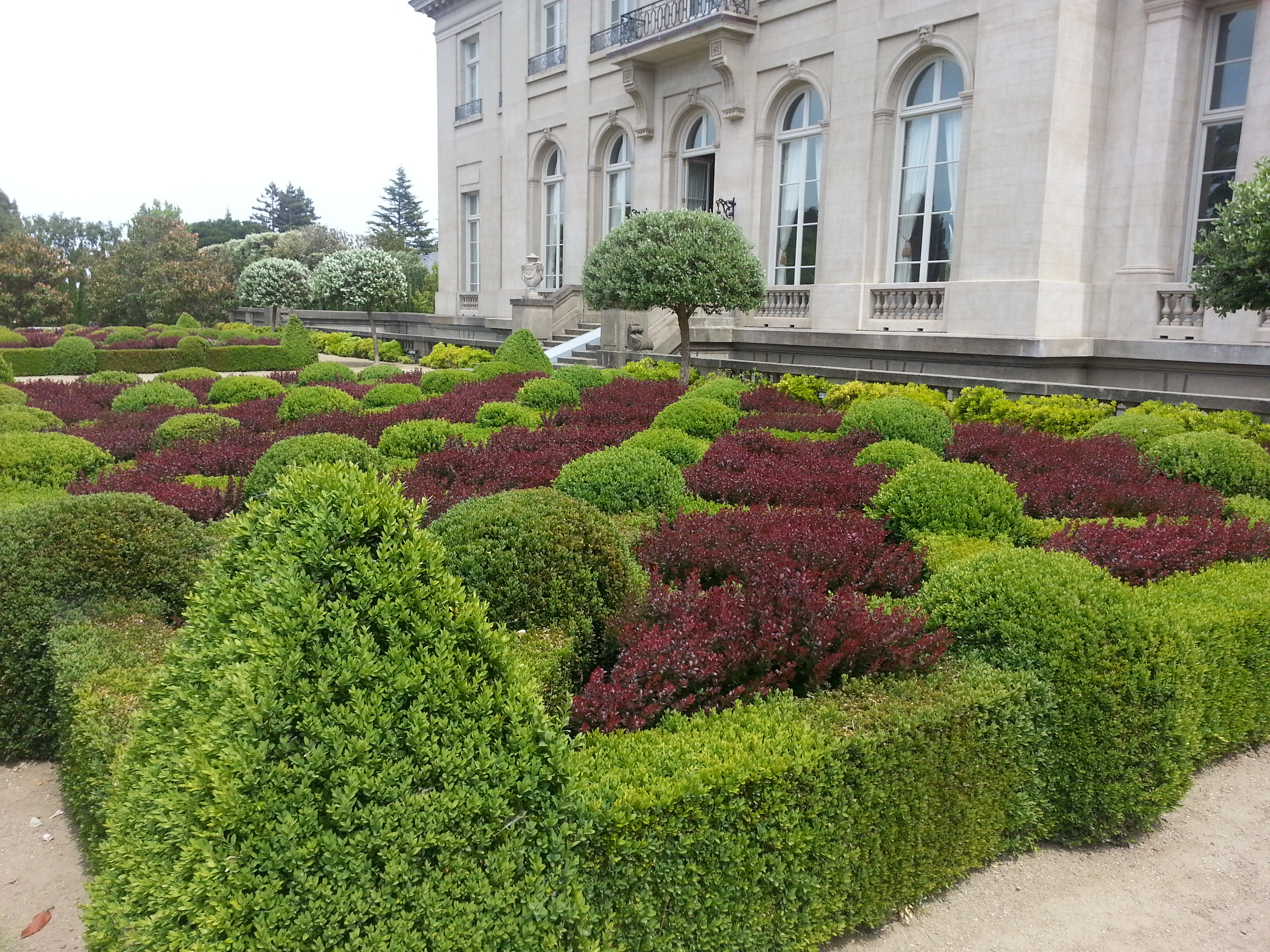
Carolands Chateau- Duchêne Border Parterre 2013

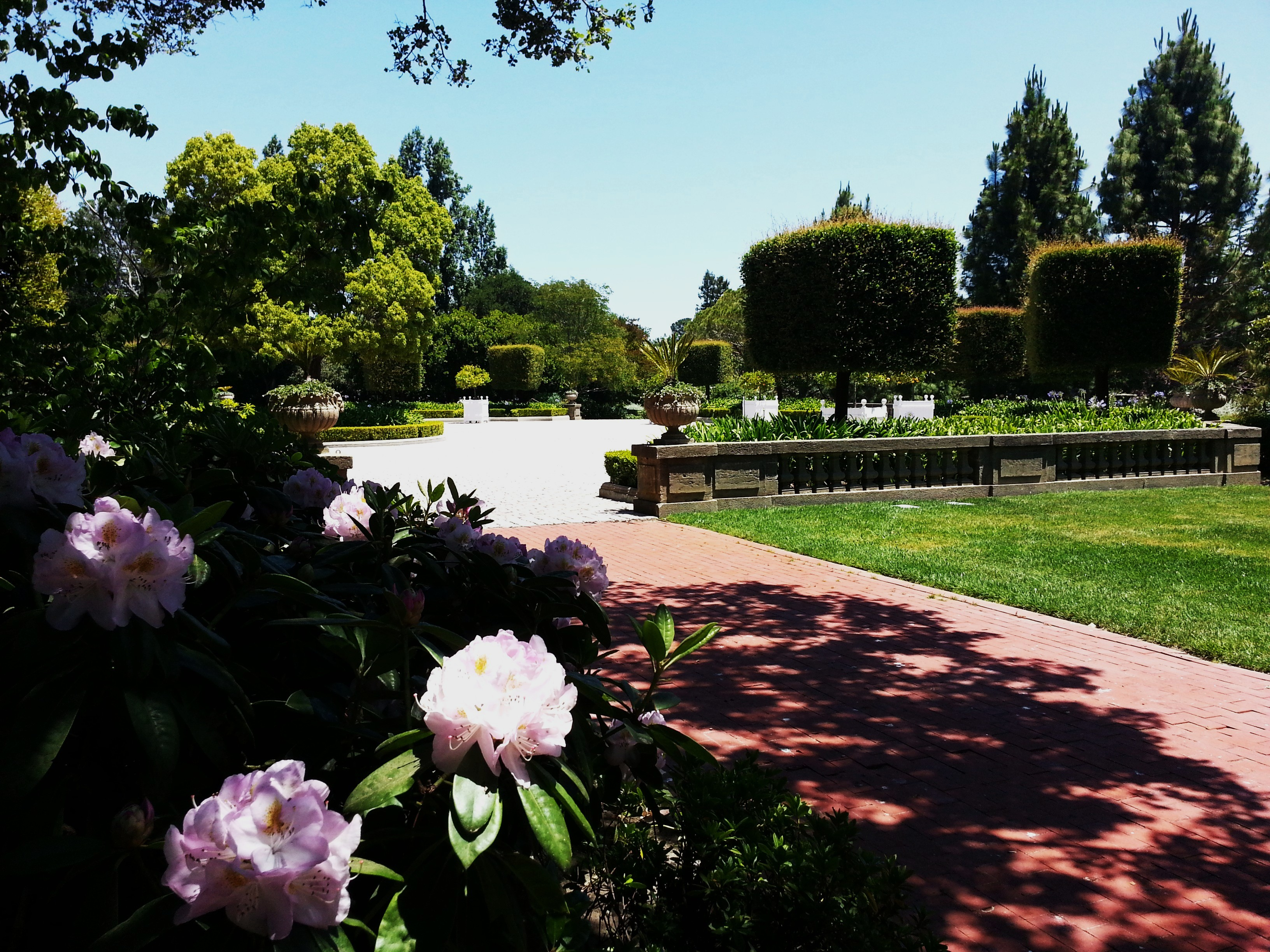
Carolands Chateau- Entry Courtyard view across Gardens 2013

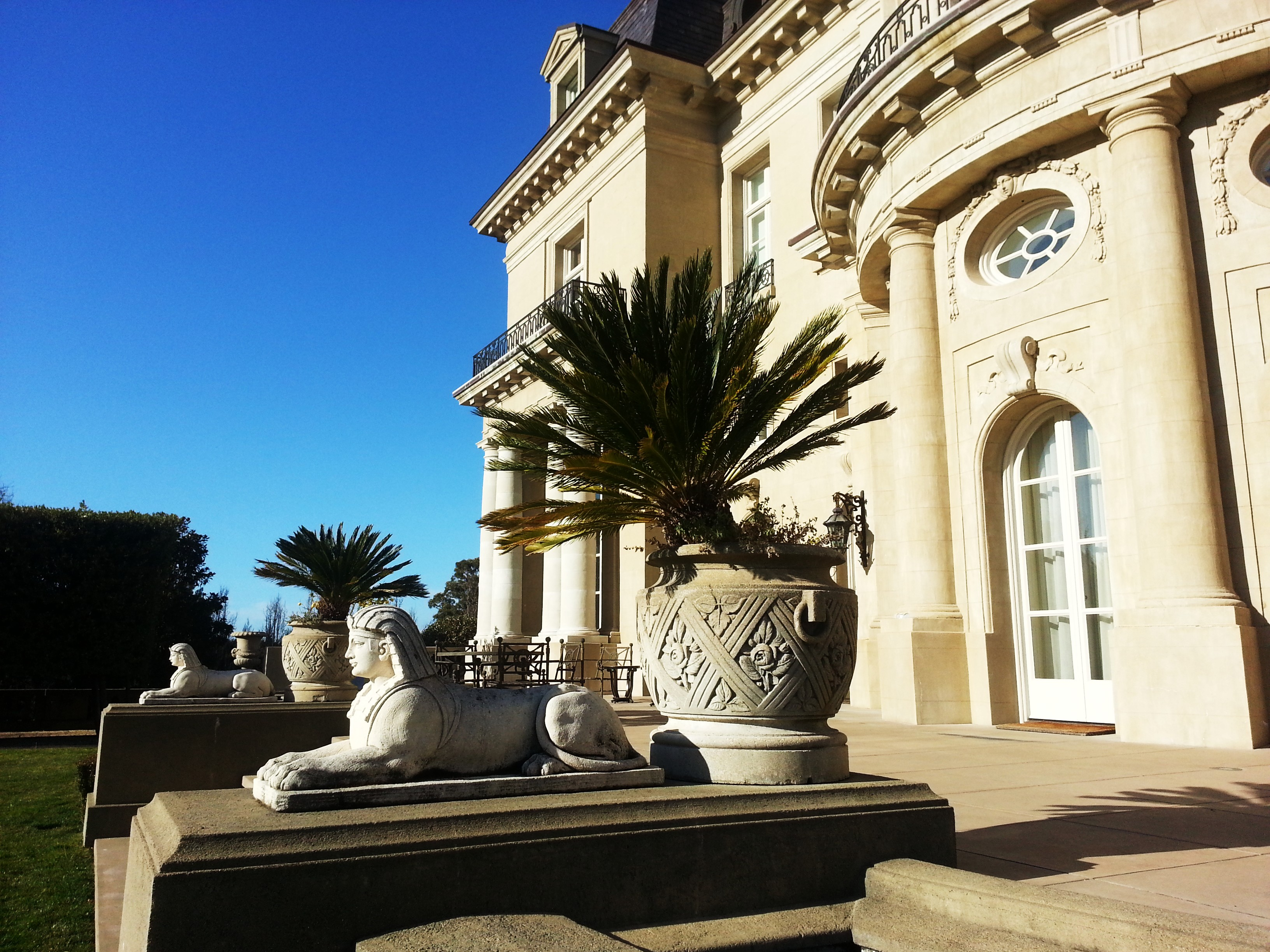
Carolands Chateau- West Terrace and Sphinx 2013

=== Interiors ===
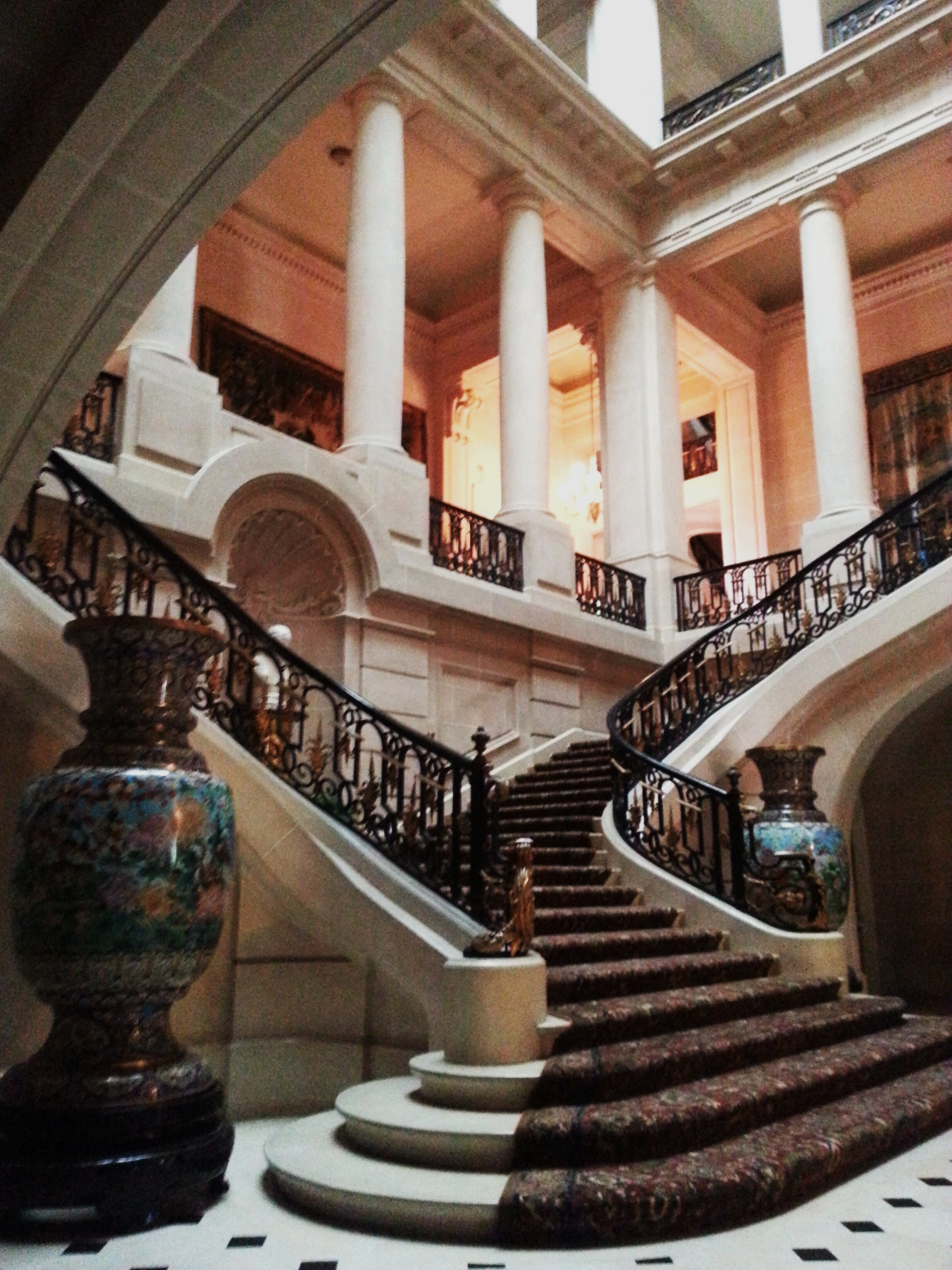
Carolands Chateau: Grand Staircase after restoration

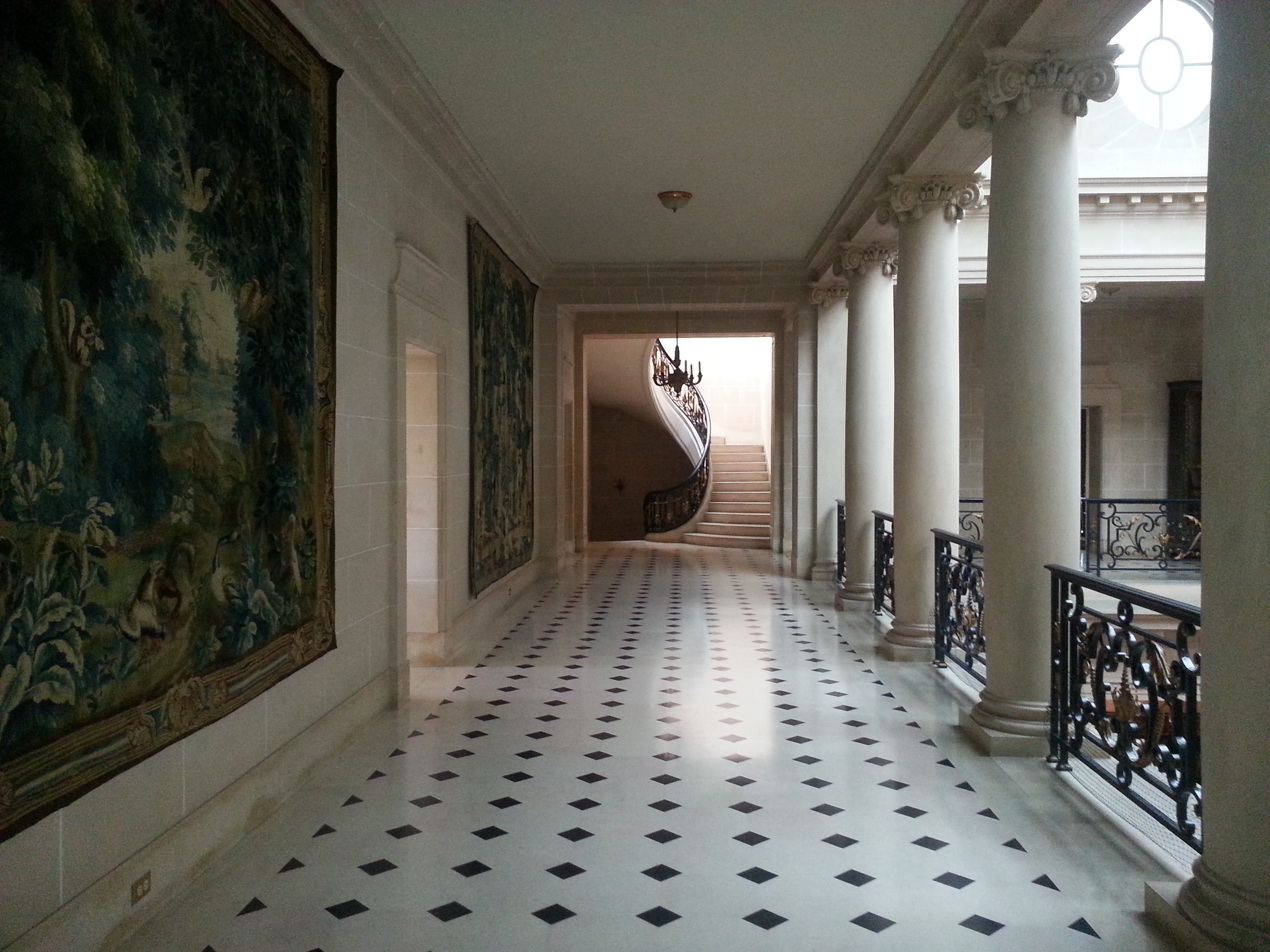
Carolands Chateau: Upper Gallery and Main Staircase

== In popular culture ==
In 2006 a feature-length documentary, Three Women and a Chateau, which tells the nearly 100-year history of Carolands, premiered at the Santa Barbara International Film Festival and was featured in seven other film festivals, winning Best Documentary (Grand Jury Award) at the Rhode Island International Film Festival.

The Heiress and Her Chateau: Carolands of California, a one-hour documentary about the chateau, first premiered January 19, 2014, on KQED-TV, and the following year was broadcast nationally on PBS. It was nominated for two Emmy Awards: Outstanding Achievement – Cultural/Historical Documentary and Outstanding Achievement - Writer. Both documentaries were made by Luna Productions.
