= Conference of Montreal =

- Organized by: International Economic Forum of the Americas
- Type: International Conference
- Frequency: Annually
- Founded: 1995
- Founded by: Gil Rémillard
- Location: Montreal, Quebec, Canada
- Topics: Economy; Governance; Pensions; Energy; Infrastructure; Sustainable Development; International Trade; Innovation; Health
- Next Event: June 9–11, 2025
- Sister Organizations: Toronto Global Forum; World Strategic Forum; The Conference of Paris
- Website: forum-americas.org/montreal

The Conference of Montreal is an annual economic event organized by the International Economic Forum of the Americas (IEFA) since 1995.

== Mission ==
The Conference of Montreal is a not-for-profit organization engaged to heightening knowledge and awareness of the issues concerning economic globalization, with a particular emphasis on the relations between the Americas and other continents.

The Conference works to foster exchanges of information and to promote free discussion on major current economic issues. It also facilitates meetings between world leaders to encourage international discourse by bringing together heads of state, the private sector, international organizations and civil society.

The Conference brings together 200 speakers and more than 4,200 people from across the globe every year.

== History ==
The Conference of Montreal was founded in 1995, by Gil Rémillard, at a time when the globalization of the economies was beginning to emerge at an increased rate.

With the fall of communism, the success of the "Uruguay round" in 1989, the creation of the World Trade Organization (WTO) in 1994 and the beginnings of North American Free Trade Agreement (NAFTA), the world was ready to construct a global market that would benefit to every country. A desire emerged to create an independent international forum in Montreal, to identify and discuss the impact of all these developments on the global economic system. A first conference was organized on June 20–22, 1995.

The IEFA now hosts four annual events: the Conference of Montreal, the Toronto Global Forum (founded in 2007), the World Strategic Forum, held in Miami (founded in 2011), as well as the Conference of Paris (founded in 2017).

In June 2018, the Conference of Montreal celebrated its 25th-anniversary edition under the theme "Embracing Change", and reiterated its position among the most important international economic forums, connecting world leaders for twenty-five years.

== Notable speakers ==
- Madeleine Albright, United States Secretary of State (1997-2001)
- Michelle Bachelet, President of the Republic of Chile (2006-2010; 2014-2018)
- Arundhati Bhattacharya, chairperson, State Bank of India
- Irina Bokova, director general, United Nations Educational, Scientific and Cultural Organisation (UNESCO) (2009-2017)
- Winnie Byanyima, executive director, Oxfam International
- Mark Carney, governor, Bank of England
- David M. Cote, Chief Executive Officer, GS Acquisition Holdings
- Vicente Fox, President of Mexico (2000-2006)
- Alan Greenspan, Chairman of the Federal Reserve of the United States of America (1987-2006)
- Ólafur Ragnar Grímsson, President of the Republic of Iceland (1996-2016)
- Angel Gurría, secretary-general, Organisation for Economic Co-operation and Development (OECD)
- Stephen Harper, Prime Minister of Canada (2006-2015)
- Jeffrey Immelt, chairman and chief executive officer, GE (2000-2017)
- Michaëlle Jean, secretary general, International Organisation of la Francophonie
- Donald Kaberuka, president, African Development Bank (2005-2015)
- Jim Yong Kim, president, The World Bank
- Haruhiko Kuroda, governor, Bank of Japan
- Christine Lagarde, managing director, International Monetary Fund (IMF)
- Gerard Mestrallet, Chairman, Suez; and Honorary Chairman, Engie
- Pervez Musharraf, President of Pakistan (2001-2008)
- Patrick Pouyanné, president of the executive committee and CEO, Total
- Ségolène Royal, Minister of Ecology, Sustainable Development and Energy, France (2014-2017)
- Kamalesh Sharma, Secretary-General, Commonwealth (2008-2016)
- Lawrence Summers, former director, National Economic Council (2009-2010); former president of Harvard University (2001-2006)
- Álvaro Uribe Vélez, President of Colombia (2002-2010)
- Paul Volcker, Chairman of the Federal Reserve of the United States of America (1979-1987)
- Robert B. Zoellick, former president, World Bank Group (2007-2012)

== Board of Governors ==
=== Chair ===
Paul Desmarais, Jr., chairman and Co-Chief Executive Officer, Power Corporation of Canada (PCC)

=== Founding Chairman ===
Gil Rémillard

=== Governors ===
Current members of the board of governors of the Conference of Montreal are:

- Joseph J. Andrew, Dentons
- Dominic Barton, McKinsey & Company
- Perrin Beatty, The Canadian Chamber of Commerce
- David M. Cote, Chief Executive Officer, GS Acquisition Holdings
- Suma Chakrabarti, European Bank for Reconstruction and Development (EBRD)
- Jacques Delors, Notre Europe; former president, European Commission
- Hélène Desmarais, HEC Montréal; Centre d'entreprises et d'innovation de Montréal (CEIM)
- Suzanne Fortier, McGill University
- Angel Gurría, Organisation for Economic Co-operation and Development (OECD)
- Glenn Hutchins, Silver Lake
- Michaëlle Jean, International Organisation of la Francophonie
- Robert Keating, Deputy Minister of International Relations and la Francophonie, Québec
- Christine Lagarde, International Monetary Fund (IMF)
- Luis Almagro Lemes, Organization of American States (OAS)
- Monique F. Leroux, International Co-operative Alliance (ICA)
- John Manley, Canadian Council of Chief Executives
- Gérard Mestrallet, Chairman, Suez; and Honorary Chairman, Engie
- Luis Alberto Moreno, President Inter-American Development Bank (IDB)
- Louis Morisset, President and Chief Executive Officer Autorité des marchés financiers (AMF)
- Michael Sabia, President and Chief Executive Officer Caisse de dépôt et placement du Québec
- Timothy Sargent, Deputy Minister for international Trade, Canada
- Jean-Claude Trichet, Honorary Governor Bank of France; Former President, European Central Bank; Chairman Group of Thirty; and Chairman European Group of the Trilateral Commission

=== Secretary ===
Duarte M. Miranda

== See also ==
- International Economic Forum of the Americas
- Toronto Global Forum
- World Strategic Forum
