= National Register of Historic Places listings in Marin County, California =

Location of Marin County in California

This is a list of the National Register of Historic Places listings in Marin County, California.

This is intended to be a complete list of the properties and districts on the National Register of Historic Places in Marin County, California, United States. Latitude and longitude coordinates are provided for many National Register properties and districts; these locations may be seen together in an online map.

There are 55 properties and districts listed on the National Register in the county, including 4 National Historic Landmarks.

This National Park Service list is complete through NPS recent listings posted September 4, 2026.

== Current listings ==
	Name on the Register	Image	Date listed	Location	City or town	Description
1	Alexander-Acacia Bridge	Alexander-Acacia Bridge	January 5, 1984 (#84000903)	Alexander Avenue between Acacia and Monte Vista Avenues; 37°55′48″N 122°31′55″W	Larkspur	
2	Angel Island, U.S. Immigration Station	Angel Island, U.S. Immigration Station	October 14, 1971 (#71000164)	Southeast of Tiburon in San Francisco Bay; 37°51′44″N 122°25′53″W	Tiburon	
3	William G. Barrett House	William G. Barrett House	June 17, 1980 (#80004490)	156 Bulkley Avenue; 37°51′25″N 122°28′52″W	Sausalito	
4	Boyd House	Boyd House	December 17, 1974 (#74000528)	1125 B Street; 37°58′31″N 122°31′46″W	San Rafael	Now houses the Marin History Museum
5	Bradford House	Bradford House	June 6, 1980 (#80000818)	333 G Street; 37°58′37″N 122°32′13″W	San Rafael	
6	China Camp	China Camp	April 26, 1979 (#79000493)	247 North San Pedro Drive; 38°00′03″N 122°27′41″W	San Rafael	
7	The Dipsea Trail	The Dipsea Trail	June 4, 2010 (#10000356)	Throckmorton Avenue, Sequoia Valley Road, Panoramic Highway, State Route 1, Muir Woods National Monument, Golden Gate National Recreation Area; 37°54′17″N 122°33′16″W	Mill Valley and Stinson Beach	Course of the Dipsea Race, a challenging annual race run since 1905, from Mill Valley to Stinson Beach. Has more than 680 steps, to start!
8	Dixie Schoolhouse	Dixie Schoolhouse	December 26, 1972 (#72000236)	2255 Las Gallinas Avenue; 38°01′46″N 122°32′46″W	San Rafael	
9	Robert Dollar Estate	Robert Dollar Estate	December 11, 1972 (#72000237)	1408 Mission Avenue; 37°58′33″N 122°31′56″W	San Rafael	
10	Robert Dollar House	Robert Dollar House	July 23, 1991 (#91000920)	115 J Street; 37°58′48″N 122°32′28″W	San Rafael	
11	Dolliver House	Dolliver House	May 22, 1978 (#78000703)	58 Madrone Avenue; 37°55′53″N 122°32′15″W	Larkspur	
12	Drakes Bay Historic and Archeological District	Drakes Bay Historic and Archeological District	October 16, 2012 (#12001006)	Address Restricted; 38°02′03″N 122°56′27″W	Point Reyes Station	The recognized landing site of Francis Drake in 1579 and Sebastian Rodriguez Cermeño in 1595, and the early interactions between Native Americans and these European visitors.
13	Fashion Shop and Stephen Porcella House	Fashion Shop and Stephen Porcella House	June 25, 1980 (#80000817)	800 Grant Avenue and 1009 Reichert Avenue; 38°06′26″N 122°33′59″W	Novato	
14	Forts Baker, Barry, and Cronkhite	Forts Baker, Barry, and Cronkhite	December 12, 1973 (#73000255)	South of Sausalito off U.S. Route 101; 37°50′09″N 122°28′40″W	Sausalito	Forts Baker, Barry and Cronkhite form a historical district together.
15	Green Brae Brick Yard	Green Brae Brick Yard	March 24, 1978 (#78000704)	125 East Sir Francis Drake Boulevard; 37°56′41″N 122°30′20″W	Larkspur	Now known as The Melting Pot restaurant
16	Griswold House	Griswold House	September 12, 1985 (#85002306)	639 Main Street; 37°50′56″N 122°29′07″W	Sausalito	
17	Hamilton Army Air Field Discontiguous Historic District	Hamilton Army Air Field Discontiguous Historic District	November 20, 1998 (#98001347)	Mostly the southwest part of Hamilton Army Air Field; 38°03′33″N 122°30′52″W	Novato	
18	Larkspur Downtown Historic District	Larkspur Downtown Historic District	October 7, 1982 (#82000972)	234-552½ Magnolia Avenue; 37°56′06″N 122°32′08″W	Larkspur	
19	The Last Resort Historic District		March 25, 2024 (#100010109)	230 Cintura Avenue and 2 Alta Avenue; 38°00′59″N 122°42′12″W	Lagunitas	
20	Lyford's Stone Tower	Lyford's Stone Tower	December 2, 1976 (#76000497)	2034 Paradise Drive; 37°52′24″N 122°26′57″W	Tiburon	
21	Benjamin and Hilarita Lyford House	Benjamin and Hilarita Lyford House	November 10, 2000 (#00001268)	376 Greenwood Beach Road; 37°53′40″N 122°29′50″W	Tiburon	
22	Marconi Wireless-Synanon Tomales Bay Headquarters Historic District	Marconi Wireless-Synanon Tomales Bay Headquarters Historic District	July 24, 1989 (#88003223)	18500 State Route 1; 38°08′39″N 122°52′38″W	Marshall	Boundary increase and renaming approved January 31, 2025.
23	Marconi-RCA Bolinas Transmitting Station	Marconi-RCA Bolinas Transmitting Station	February 23, 2018 (#100002108)	Mesa Rd. 37°54′47″N 122°43′40″W	Bolinas	
24	Marin Art and Garden Center		June 6, 2022 (#100007228)	30 Sir Francis Drake Blvd. 37°57′49″N 122°33′21″W	Ross	
25	Marin City Public Housing	Marin City Public Housing	September 18, 2017 (#100001604)	101-429 Drake Ave., 1-99 Cole Dr. 37°52′09″N 122°30′32″W	Marin City	
26	Marin County Civic Center	Marin County Civic Center	July 17, 1991 (#91002055)	Junction of North San Pedro Road and Civic Center Drive; 37°59′51″N 122°31′49″W	San Rafael	The last commission of architect Frank Lloyd Wright
27	Marinship Machine Shop	Marinship Machine Shop	December 20, 2016 (#16000865)	25 Liberty Ship Way; 37°51′46″N 122°29′38″W	Sausalito	
28	Erskine B. McNear House	Erskine B. McNear House	January 11, 1982 (#82002204)	121 Knight Drive; 37°59′06″N 122°28′46″W	San Rafael	
29	Mill Valley City Hall and Fire Station	Mill Valley City Hall and Fire Station	January 5, 2026 (#100012501)	26 Corte Madera Avenue; 37°54′26″N 122°32′52″W	Mill Valley	
30	Miller Creek School Indian Mound		October 14, 1971 (#71000163)	Address restricted	San Rafael	
31	Mount Tamalpais Mountain Theater	Mount Tamalpais Mountain Theater	February 2, 2015 (#14001234)	3801 Panoramic Hwy. 37°54′47″N 122°36′30″W	Mill Valley	
32	Muir Beach Archeological Site		January 26, 1981 (#81000097)	Address restricted	Marin City	
33	Muir Woods National Monument	Muir Woods National Monument	January 9, 2008 (#07001396)	Muir Woods Road; 37°53′33″N 122°34′20″W	Mill Valley	
34	Olema Lime Kilns	Olema Lime Kilns	October 8, 1976 (#76000217)	4 mi (6.4 km) southeast of Olema on State Route 1; 37°59′18″N 122°44′46″W	Olema	
35	Olema Valley Dairy Ranches Historic District		April 9, 2018 (#100002286)	Point Reyes NS & Golden Gate NRA; 38°00′04″N 122°45′00″W	Olema vicinity	
36	Outdoor Art Club	Outdoor Art Club	November 16, 1978 (#78000705)	1 W. Blithedale Avenue; 37°54′25″N 122°32′49″W	Mill Valley	1904 American Craftsman style clubhouse designed by Bernard Maybeck. 1923 wing by William Huson. With mature gardens and pergola.
37	Pierce Ranch	Pierce Ranch	December 6, 1985 (#85003324)	Point Reyes National Seashore; 38°11′23″N 122°57′15″W	Inverness	
38	Point Bonita Light Station	Point Bonita Light Station	September 3, 1991 (#91001099)	Point Bonita; 37°48′56″N 122°31′46″W	Sausalito	Built in 1887 in the Marin Headlands at entrance to San Francisco Bay. Last staffed lighthouse on the California coast (until 1980).
39	Point Reyes Lifeboat Rescue Station, 1927	Point Reyes Lifeboat Rescue Station, 1927	November 7, 1985 (#85002756)	Drake's Bay, Point Reyes National Seashore; 37°59′39″N 122°58′25″W	Inverness	
40	Point Reyes Light Station	Point Reyes Light Station	September 3, 1991 (#91001100)	Point Reyes National Seashore; 37°59′44″N 123°01′24″W	Point Reyes	Completed and first lit in 1870. Automated in 1975.
41	Point Reyes Naval Radio Compass Station	Point Reyes Naval Radio Compass Station	June 29, 2018 (#100002619)	23250 Sir Francis Drake Blvd. 38°02′10″N 122°59′37″W	Inverness vicinity	
42	Point Reyes Peninsula Dairy Ranches Historic District	Point Reyes Peninsula Dairy Ranches Historic District	October 29, 2018 (#100002147)	Point Reyes National Seashore; 38°08′12″N 122°55′30″W	Inverness vicinity	
43	RCA Point Reyes Receiving Station	RCA Point Reyes Receiving Station	February 23, 2018 (#100002109)	17400 Sir Francis Drake Blvd. 38°05′45″N 122°56′50″W	Inverness	
44	Rancho Olompali	Rancho Olompali	January 12, 1973 (#73000409)	Olompali State Historic Park; 38°09′12″N 122°34′18″W	Novato	Site of Coast Miwok village, Mexican Rancho Olompali and subsequent ranch buildings.
45	Valentine Rey House	Valentine Rey House	April 22, 1982 (#82002203)	428 Golden Gate Avenue; 37°51′54″N 122°27′37″W	Belvedere	
46	St. Hilary's Mission Church	St. Hilary's Mission Church	February 3, 2020 (#100004935)	201 Esperanza St. 37°52′43″N 122°27′21″W	Tiburon	
47	San Francisco and North Pacific Railroad Station House-Depot	San Francisco and North Pacific Railroad Station House-Depot	August 4, 1995 (#95000997)	1920 Paradise Drive; 37°52′21″N 122°27′08″W	Tiburon	
48	San Rafael Improvement Club	San Rafael Improvement Club	March 29, 1984 (#84000907)	1800 5th Avenue; 37°58′30″N 122°32′20″W	San Rafael	
49	Sausalito Woman's Club	Sausalito Woman's Club	April 15, 1993 (#93000272)	120 Central Avenue; 37°51′07″N 122°28′51″W	Sausalito	1918 building by Bay Area architect Julia Morgan
50	Brock Schreiber Boathouse and Beach	Brock Schreiber Boathouse and Beach	July 7, 1978 (#78000702)	12830 Sir Francis Drake Boulevard; 38°06′01″N 122°51′16″W	Inverness	
51	Station KPH Operating Station	Station KPH Operating Station	July 24, 1989 (#89000819)	18500 State Route 1; 38°08′39″N 122°52′38″W	Marshall	
52	Steamship TENNESSEE Remains	Steamship TENNESSEE Remains	April 15, 1981 (#81000102)	Address Restricted	Marin City	
53	Tocaloma Bridge	Tocaloma Bridge	September 14, 2018 (#100002959)	Old segment of Sir Francis Drake Blvd. across Lagunitas Cr. 38°03′01″N 122°45′36″W	Tocaloma	
54	Tomales Presbyterian Church and Cemetery	Tomales Presbyterian Church and Cemetery	August 1, 1975 (#75000437)	11 Church Street; 38°14′43″N 122°54′26″W	Tomales	
55	West Point Inn	West Point Inn	December 22, 2011 (#11000934)	Old railroad grade, Mt. Tamalpais; 37°55′00″N 122°35′38″W	Mill Valley	1904 inn at the westernmost point of the Mount Tamalpais and Muir Woods Railway

== See also ==
- List of National Historic Landmarks in California
- National Register of Historic Places listings in California
- California Historical Landmarks in Marin County, California
