= California Historical Landmarks in Marin County =

List table of the properties and districts listed as California Historical Landmarks within Marin County, Northern California.

- Note: Click the "Map of all coordinates" link to the right to view a Google map of all properties and districts with latitude and longitude coordinates in the table below.

== Listings ==
Image		Landmark name	Location	City or town	Summary
Angel Island	529	Angel Island	Angel Island State Park; 37°52′N 122°26′W	San Francisco Bay	
Bird's Nest Glen	679	Bird's Nest Glen	Marin Town and Country Club	Fairfax	
New Albion	1061	New Albion	Drakes Bay, Point Reyes, California; 38°02′05″N 122°56′26″W	Inverness	This California Historical Landmark location is the landing site of Francis Drake's Golden Hind in 1579. It is related to the Drakes Bay National Historic and Archaeologic District National Historic Landmark.
China Camp	924	China Camp	899 North San Pedro Rd. 37°59′57″N 122°29′18″W	Santa Venetia	Also on the NRHP list as NPS-79000493
First sawmill in Marin County	207	First sawmill in Marin County	Old Mill Park; 37°54′14″N 122°31′09″W	Mill Valley	
Golden Gate Bridge	974	Golden Gate Bridge	Golden Gate Bridge; 37°49′11″N 122°28′43″W		
Greenbrae Brick Kiln	917	Greenbrae Brick Kiln	125 E Sir Francis Drake Blvd. 37°56′41″N 122°30′21″W	Larkspur	
Lighter Wharf	221	Lighter Wharf	Bolinas Lagoon	Bolinas	
Marin County Civic Center	999	Marin County Civic Center	10 Avenue of the Flags; 37°59′59″N 122°31′48″W	San Rafael	Also on the NRHP list as NPS-91002055
Mission San Rafael Arcángel	220	Mission San Rafael Arcángel	5th Ave. and A St. 37°58′28″N 122°31′40″W	San Rafael	
Olema Lime Kilns	222	Olema Lime Kilns	State Hwy 1; 37°59′18″N 122°44′46″W	Olema	Also on the NRHP list as NPS-76000217
Outdoor Art Club	922	Outdoor Art Club	1 W Blithedale Ave. 37°54′24″N 122°32′48″W	Mill Valley	
Olompali State Historic Park	210	Olompali State Historic Park	8901 Redwood Hwy; 38°09′09″N 122°34′11″W	Novato	
Pioneer Paper Mill	552	Pioneer Paper Mill	Samuel P. Taylor State Park; 38°01′44″N 122°44′30″W	Lagunitas	
St. Vincent's School for Boys	630	St. Vincent's School for Boys	1 Saint Vincents Dr.	San Rafael	

== See also ==
- List of California Historical Landmarks
- National Register of Historic Places listings in Marin County, California
