= Schreiber House =

Schreiber House may refer to:

in the United Kingdom

- Schreiber House, West Hampstead, designed by architect James Gowan

in the United States

- Schreiber House (Phoenix, Arizona), designed by Schreiber twins
- Brock Schreiber Boathouse and Beach, Inverness, California, listed on the National Register of Historic Places (NRHP) in Marin County
- Adolph Schreiber House, Boise, Idaho, NRHP-listed
