= Robert Dollar =

Scots-American industrialist (1844–1932)

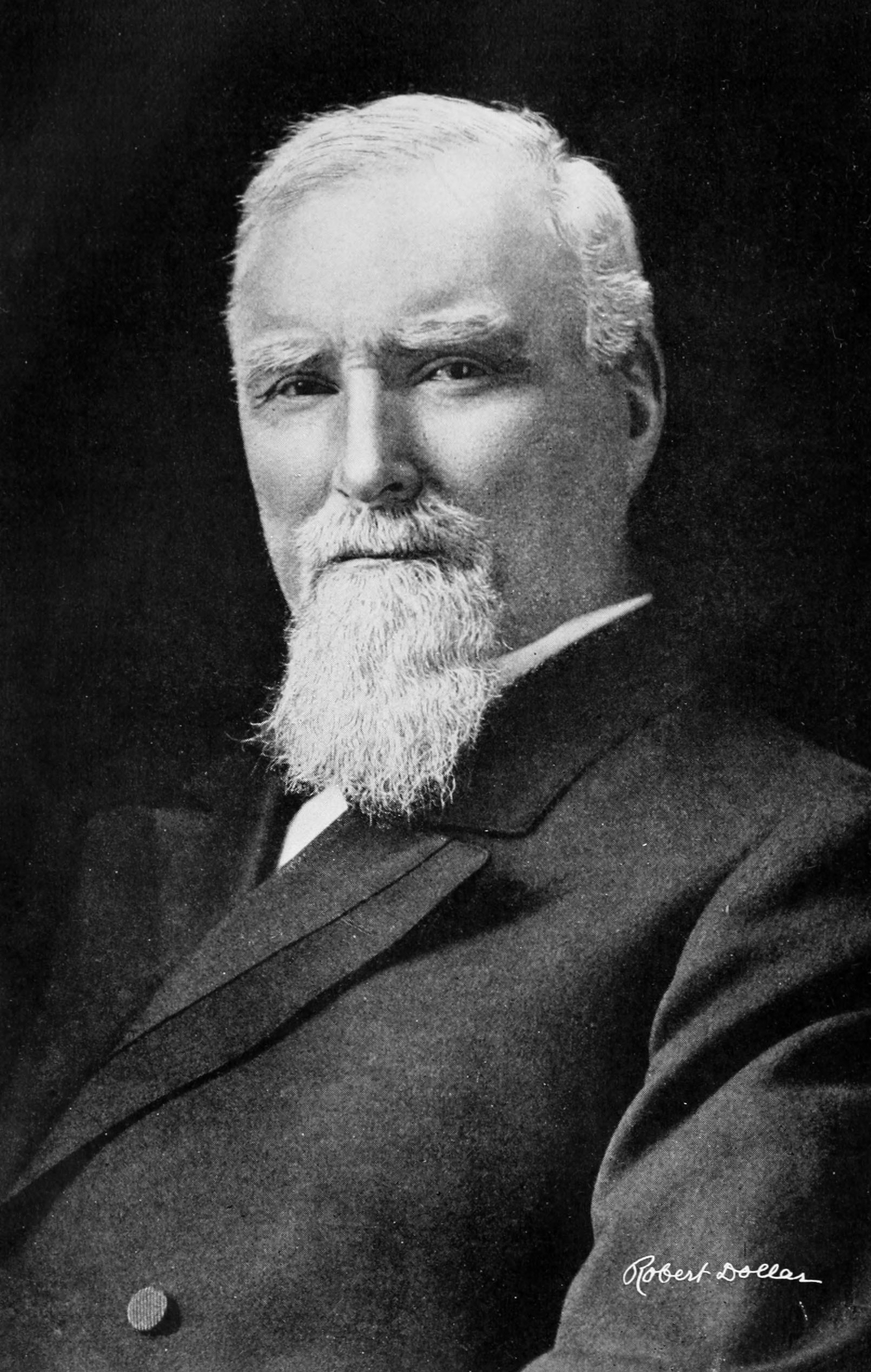
- Dollar in 1917
- Born: 20 March 1844; Falkirk, Scotland, United Kingdom
- Died: 16 May 1932 (aged 88); San Rafael, California, United States
- Resting place: Mount Tamalpais Cemetery
- Spouse: Margaret Snedden Proudfoot
- Children: Alexander Melville Dollar; Robert Stanley Dollar; Mary Grace Dollar Dickson; John Harold Dollar

Robert Dollar, also known as Captain Robert Dollar (1844–1932), was a Scottish-American industrialist born in Bainsford, Falkirk, Scotland. The title "Captain" was honorary and he was called the "Grand Old Man of the Pacific". Both were bestowed after his entry into the shipping industry. Dollar became a lumber baron, shipping magnate, philanthropist; he was also a Freemason. His biography and an extensive introduction by him is contained within the book, Men Who Are Making the West 1923.

California Governor James Rolph Jr. said at the time of his death, "Robert Dollar has done more in his lifetime to spread the American flag on the high seas than any man in this country." He made the cover of Time magazine on 19 March 1928, with several writings concerning his business', and was given a long obituary in the 23 May 1932, issue.

== Childhood ==
He was born on 20 March 1844, to William Dollar and Mary Melville. He had two younger brothers, John and James. His mother died in 1853, and Robert dropped out of school and worked in a machine shop and then as an errand boy for a lumber shipping company to help support the family. After the death of Robert's mother, his father married a servant girl named Mary Easton, and in 1857 they had a daughter, also named Mary, and in 1858 a son named William. Shortly afterwards, the family emigrated to Canada. Robert began working at a lumber camp as a cook's helper when he was 14 years old, and later found work in a barrel stave factory. He learned French, and worked his way up to doing the camp accounting.

In 1861, Robert held his first real job as a logger. He had the task of driving the logs down the river to the mill. There were no roads so all travel was by water. Logging took place some distance from the mill, so running the logs could take about three months. In 1866, Robert began to keep a diary, which he continued until 1918; thus, he was able to write his memoirs in later years and tell the vivid tales of logging in Canada. For example, "The first three or four days I couldn't 'keep my feet' and spent more time in the water than out of it. But experience is the best teacher and I soon learned to stay on top of the logs." Dollar worked in logging camps in the forests of Canada and the Upper Peninsula of Michigan.

== Family ==
Robert met Margaret S. Proudfoot in a Presbyterian Church, and they were married in 1874. This was during the time after he sustained a loss in his timber venture, was heavily in debt, and determined to pay off his share, which was $2500. For their honeymoon, he took his new bride, along with 18 men, to Bracebridge, Ontario, to establish a lumber camp. Robert and Margaret were close companions, and Margaret accompanied her husband on most of his world trips. She told her granddaughters, "When you get married, never let your husband know he can get along without you." Robert once stated, "My real success began with my wedding day." According to one source:

She was a quiet person, but very determined to keep up with Robert's adventures. She took an airplane ride over Shanghai in 1927. Commenting on his constant search for new challenges, Margaret said, "Sometimes I think in the modern world of marvels, he will never be satisfied until he is the skipper of a round trip to Mars.

=== Children ===
The Dollars had four children: Alexander Melville and Robert Stanley were born in Bracebridge. The timber was playing out, so in 1885 the family moved to Marquette, Michigan, where Mary Grace and John Harold were born.

== Lumber baron ==
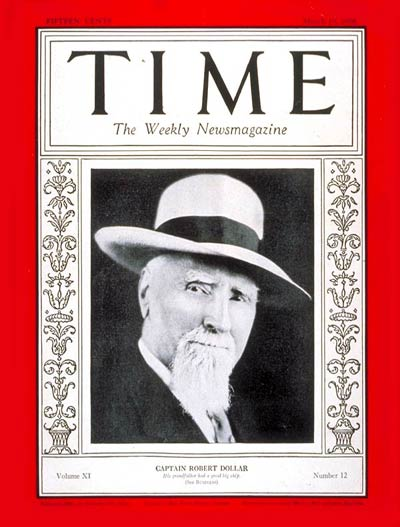
Robert Dollar on the cover of TIME Magazine, 19 March 1928

At age 22, Robert took over running a camp as Director of the English and American Lumber Company. His first venture into the lumber industry began when he bought a lumber camp, but it failed. This did not deter him, and, apparently learning from his mistakes, he bought other camps that were successful. He bought camps and timberland in Canada, then in the upper peninsula of Michigan and finally in Northern California.

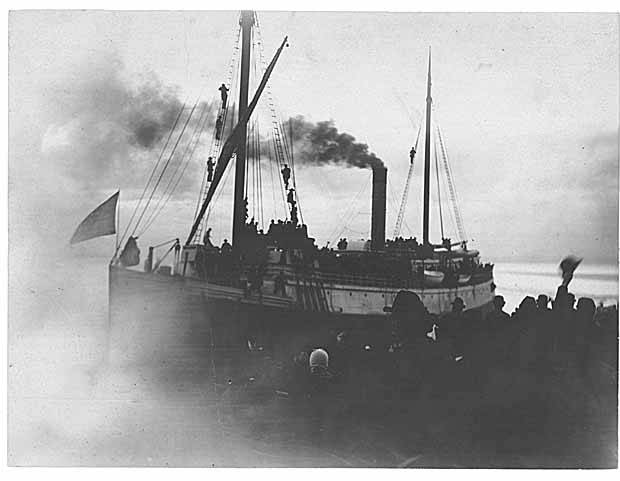
Departure of the steamer Robert Dollar from Seattle for Nome, Alaska, ca. 1900

In 1888, the family moved to San Rafael, California, and Robert bought timberland and logging camps in Sonoma, a mill and lumber business at Usal in Mendocino county, and other places such as Oregon and as far north as British Columbia. Among his purchases was timberland known as "Dollar's Meeker tract." This section still had redwood trees. A portion of this tract, located on the Russian River, was sold to the Bohemian Club of San Francisco and is now the Bohemian Grove.

In 1891, he moved to the Robert Dollar House, the first house he built in San Rafael. In 1906, Robert bought a Victorian style home in San Rafael and named it "Falkirk," after his birthplace in Scotland. He lived there until his death. He left the estate to his family and it was purchased by the community in 1975 for $250,000. The name Falkirk was retained as the Falkirk Cultural Center.

== Shipping magnate ==
In 1895, he acquired his first ship, a steam schooner called Newsboy, to move his lumber from the Pacific Northwest to markets down the coast. Thus began his entry into the shipping industry that included lumber, commodities, mail, and passengers. In the process he became a San Francisco shipping magnate who entered the lumber trade in Canada. In 1903, Robert and his three sons incorporated their interests into the Robert Dollar Company. In 1910, Dollar built an 11-story office building in San Francisco, headquarters of the Dollar Steamship Company, which was expanded in 1919. During the inter-war years, his freighters plied the Pacific and were a common sight from Canada to Canton, San Francisco to Shanghai, and Tacoma to Tokyo.

In 1923, the purchase of seven "president" ships owned by the U.S. Government allowed Dollar, at the age of 80, to pioneer his successful round-the-world passenger service. Pacific Mails, a U.S. company going back to the 1850s with the Panama-California and trans-Pacific routes, was taken over by Dollar in 1925 that added 8 more ships, and he also signed a contract with Grace Steamship Company.

The death of the founder in 1932, coupled with the Great Depression and the Pacific War, headed the company into bankruptcy. The incoming Roosevelt administration removed the critical US mail contracts from the Dollar line. The Dollar family were prominent Republicans, in 1930 they had named one of their newest liners the President Hoover, and thus drew the ire of incoming administration. In 1937, under the control of Robert Dollar's sons, Dollar Lines was bankrupt. Back taxes could not be paid and in an agreement, forced by the Roosevelt administration, Stanley Dollar turned 93% of the voting common stock over to the Maritime Commission.

In 1945, Stanley Dollar filed a lawsuit to recover ownership of the line. The battle raged until 1950 when the Supreme Court ruled in favour of Stanley Dollar. The government had other plans and did not return the company. There was a cash settlement as 7% was retained by Stanley. In 1952, oil executive Ralph K. Davies, backed by Signal Oil and Gas, purchased the company for $18,000,000 in an auction, with half going to the Dollar family. Its name was shortened to APL in 1988. In 1997, APL merged with Singapore-based NOL, and as of 2006, 68% of NOL was owned by Temasek Holdings.

=== Ship companies owned by Robert Dollar ===
- Dollar Steamship Line was founded by Robert Dollar. Control was assumed by the U.S. Shipping board and then APL.
- Dollar Line
- Admiral Oriental Line formed by H. F. Alexander was acquired in 1922 and renamed the American Mail Line.
- Pacific Mail Steamship Company (Grace Line) was founded in 1848 by William Henry Aspinwall and was taken over by Southern Pacific Railroad. Forced to sell by Congress the company was sold to Grace Line and taken over by Robert Dollar.

=== Pacific Mail (Grace Line) ships acquired by Dollar ===
- SS Mongolia
- SS Manchuria
- SS Korea
- SS Siberia
- SS China
- SS Persia

=== Ships owned by Dollar Shipping ===
The first ship was the Newsboy and others that were bought or built include those purchased as the President line.

- Agnes Dollar
- Alice Dollar
- Bessie Dollar
- Diana Dollar
- Esther Dollar
- Grace Dollar (1913)
- Grace Dollar (1918)
- Harold Dollar
- Hazel Dollar
- M. S. Dollar (named after his wife)
- Margaret Dollar (also named after his wife)
- Melville Dollar (1)
- Melville Dollar (2)
- Robert Dollar (1)
- Robert Dollar (2)
- Ruth Alexander
- Stanley Dollar (1919)
- Stanley Dollar (1923)
- Stuart Dollar
- Virginia Dollar

==== President Line ====
- SS President Adams
- SS President Buchanan
- SS President Cleveland
- SS President Coolidge
- SS President Fillmore (1)
- SS President Fillmore (2)
- SS President Fillmore (3)
- SS President Garfield
- SS President Grant
- SS President Harrison
- SS President Hayes
- SS President Hoover
- SS President Jackson
- SS President Johnson
- SS President Lincoln
- SS President Madison
- SS President Monroe
- SS President Pierce
- SS President Polk
- SS President Taft
- SS President Taylor
- SS President Tyler
- SS President van Buren
- SS President Wilson

- Note: Names of SS President Harrison; former SS Wolverine State, captured 8 Dec 1941, Japanese renamed Kakko Maru and later renamed Kachidoki Maru.

== Other divisions of the Robert Dollar company ==
- Dollar Portland Lumber Company
- Canadian Robert Dollar Co., Ltd
- Globe Wireless, Ltd.
- Egmont Timber Company
- Heitz and Kaufman

Robert Dollar had interests in China that included land, buildings, and wharves for his ships. The Dollar Steamship Line had offices in Alexandria, Egypt, Manila and Zamboanga, Philippines, Genoa, Italy, Hong Kong, Los Angeles, CA, Oakland, CA, and Portland, OR. The company had wharves on the West Coast at Bandon and Reedsport, OR, Seattle, WA, and Honolulu, HI; on the East Coast at Boston, MA, New York, NY, and Washington, D.C.; on the Great Lakes at Cleveland, OH, Toronto, ON; Chicago, Ill; in Asia, at Kobe and Yokohama, Japan, at Shanghai, Hankou, Tianjin, Yangtze River, Daye, and Wuchang, China; at Havana, Cuba, and at Naples, Italy,

The Dollar Steamship Line also owned tugboats such as the Superior and Dollarton, lumber barges such as the Dollar 1, Dollar Hulk No.1, and Dollar Vi, and motor launches such as the Stuart Dollar.

== Other tenures ==
- President of the YMCA
- President of the Ship Owner's Association
- Chair of the Board of Directors of the San Francisco Theological Seminary in San Anselmo, CA.
- President of the Merchant's Exchange
- President of the Douglas Fir Club
- Director of Seaboard National Bank (his son took over)
- Director London Paris National Bank.
- Member of the board of the San Rafael Park and Recreation Commission

== Philanthropy ==
Robert Dollar gave to many causes, mostly involving religion, but some involved social and community endeavours.

=== Sunny Hills Orphanage ===
Incorporated as the San Francisco Orphanage and Farm the name was changed to Sunny Hills Services in 2005. Robert Dollar and his wife were active in the orphanage and he provided funding to purchase land and dedication ceremonies were held on 10 February 1900. He had a school built on the property in 1902 and rebuilt after a fire in 1913. In 1920 gave 42 acres of pasture land as a Christmas gift. In 1922 a fire destroyed the main building and Robert and Mrs. Dollar donated the Dollar Dickson Memorial building in memory of their daughter who had died in 1921. In 1929 Robert built the Robert Dollar Home for Boys. Mrs. Robert Dollar was president from 1919 to 1923

=== San Francisco Theological Seminary (San Anselmo) ===
The San Francisco Theological Seminary moved to San Anselmo in 1896. In 1917 Robert Dollar founded the Chair of the New Testament Interpretation with an endowment of $50,000 known as the Robert Dollar Chair.

In 1919 Lynn T. White, the minister of the First Presbyterian Church in San Rafael gave a sermon titled, "The Christian Attitude Toward the Organized Labor Movement in America". After the sermon the minister and Robert had several discussions and both agreed to disagree. Rev. White was astounded when Robert endowed the Margaret S. Dollar Chair of Christian Social Ethics and requested Rev. White be installed as the first professor. Dr. White held the professorship until he retired in 1948.

Mr. and Mrs. Dollar donated the 13 chime carillon in 1922 that was placed in Montgomery Hall. They were moved to Geneva Hall in 1953. The SFTS news bulletin was renamed Chimes in 1937.

=== City of San Rafael ===
As a member of the San Rafael Park and Recreation Commission he donated 20 acres of land for Boyd Park in 1920. In 1923 he donated 11 more acres and other funding The Robert Dollar Scenic Drive was constructed from Boyd Park to the summit of San Rafael Hill.

=== Falkirk, Scotland (birthplace) ===
Robert Dollar and family members returned to his birthplace more than once. He provided money that bought Dollar Park and Arnotdale House, which he gave to the town, in person. He also paid for a drinking fountain that commemorates the First Battle of Falkirk; the first town library at the YMCA; the bells that were made in Baltimore and now hang and are regularly played in the tower of the ancient "Faw Kirk" Parish Church in the town centre, which is still in use. The town gave him the keys to Falkirk at a special ceremony to mark the occasion. A new Robert Dollar Commemorative Association was formed in April 2013 with a view to replicating something similar to the Andrew Carnegie Centre in Dunfermline. This new Robert Dollar Centre is intended to reflect his life and achievements.

=== Other gifts ===
- He was President of the YMCA and funded buildings for the organisation in the Far East.
- Founded a school for the blind in China.
- Built a public library in Falkirk, Scotland.
- Dollar Park in Falkirk, Scotland.
- The Grounds where the Falkirk Royal Infirmary stands

== Legacy ==
After Captain Dollar turned eighty, the newspaper reporters began to ask him when he planned to retire. He replied:

It would have been nothing short of a crime for me to have retired when I reached the age of sixty, because I have accomplished far more the last twenty years of my life than I did before I reached my sixtieth birthday ... I was put in this world for a purpose and that was not to loaf and spend my time in so-called pleasure ... I was eighty years old when I thought out the practicability of starting a passenger steamship line of eight steamers to run around the world in one direction ... I hope to continue working to my last day on earth and wake up the next morning in the other world.

Dollar did continue to work until his final days.

The National Foreign Trade Council presents an annual "Robert Dollar Award" to honour outstanding contributions to the foreign trade of the United States.

The community of Dollarville, Michigan, where Dollar once worked as general manager of the logging camp, is named for him.

One of the Robert Dollar Lumber Company steam locomotives was restored by the Pacific Locomotive Association, which acquired it in 1999 from the Western Railway Museum, where it had been a long term project. Locomotive No. 3 operates on a regular basis at the Pacific Locomotive Association's Niles Canyon Railway. This is a 2-6-2T (Tank) engine built by the American Locomotive Company in 1927.

== Death ==
Robert Dollar expressed ideas concerning one's legacy after death. He wrote:

In this world all we leave behind us that is worth anything is that we can be well regarded and spoken of after we are gone, and that we can say that we left the world just a little better than we found it. If we can't accomplish these two things then life, according to my view, has been a failure. Many people erroneously speak of a man when he is gone as having left so much money. That, according to my view, amounts to very little.

Robert Dollar's last public appearance was at the Commencement Exercises at the Theological Seminary. Although he was not feeling well, he insisted in walking in the academic procession and as President of the Board of Trustees gave a congratulatory message to the graduating class.

Robert Dollar developed bronchial pneumonia and died on 16 May 1932. Honorary pall bearers included the Governor of California and the Mayor of San Francisco. The U.S. Government sent a dirigible over the scene of the funeral, and flowers were dropped from the sky. Over 3,000 people were in attendance.

== Robert Stanley Dollar ==
Robert, who had been active in his father's business for years, and was at the helm when the shipping company was transferred to the U.S. Shipping board, became the president of the United States Line that was formed by Roosevelt SS Co., R. Stanley Dollar and Kenneth D. Dawson. The International Mercantile Marine Company gained control of the company in 1934. The daughter of Robert Stanley Dollar, and granddaughter of Robert Dollar, Diana Dollar Hickingbotham Knowles, was a well known philanthropist in San Francisco, who died in 2013 at the age of 95.

R. Stanley Dollar was associated with South Pacific Air Lines (SPAL), a small US international carrier that flew from Hawaii to the South Pacific from 1960 to 1963, before turning over its routes to Pan Am. The corporate symbol of SPAL was a winged seahorse with the Dollar flag.
