= Tiburon Railroad & Ferry Depot Museum =

- San Francisco and North Pacific Railroad Station House-Depot
- U.S. National Register of Historic Places
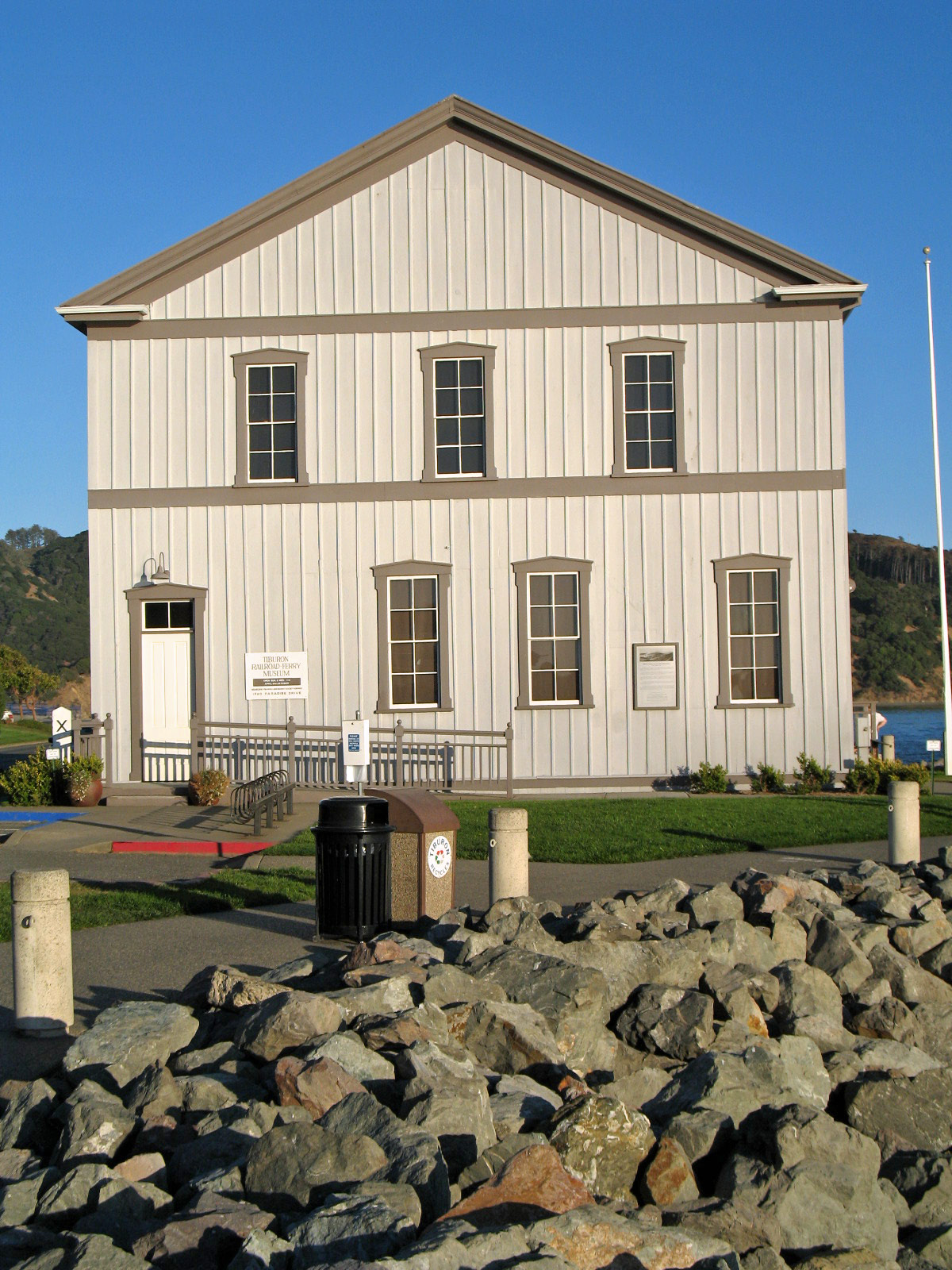

- Location within California Location within the United States
- Location: 1920 Paradise Dr., Tiburon, California
- Coordinates: 37°52′21″N 122°27′4″W
- Area: less than one acre
- Architectural style: Greek Revival
- NRHP reference No.: 95000997
- Added to NRHP: August 4, 1995

The Tiburon Railroad & Ferry Depot Museum is located at 1920 Paradise Drive, on the waterfront of Tiburon, California. It is located in the former San Francisco and North Pacific Railroad Station House/Depot, a Greek Revival building erected in 1886 by the San Francisco and North Pacific Railroad. Designed to be movable, the building has historically rested in several places, including a wharf, prior to its present location. The railroad removed its major rail and ferry passenger service to Sausalito about 1920, and usage of this building declined; it was abandoned by the railroad in 1939. It was donated to the town in 1989, and has since been restored for use as a museum. It was listed on the National Register of Historic Places in 1995.

== See also ==
- National Register of Historic Places listings in Marin County, California
