= Robert Dollar House =

Historic house in California, United States

- U.S. National Register of Historic Places
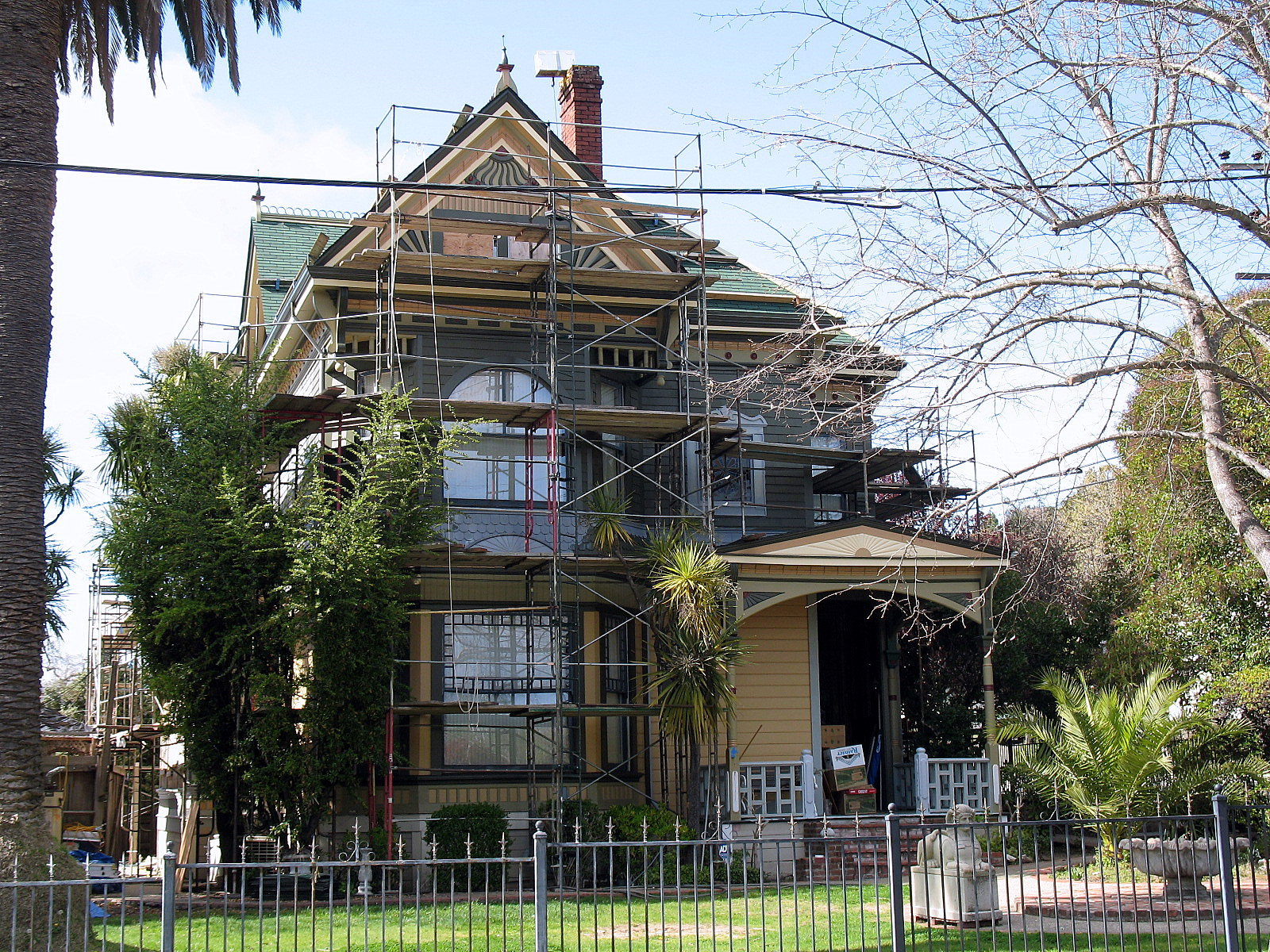

- Location within San Francisco Bay Area Location within California Location within the United States
- Location: 115 J St., San Rafael, California, US
- Coordinates: 37°58′48″N 122°32′25″W
- Area: 0.3 acres (0.12 ha)
- Built: 1891
- Architects: Newsom Bros.; Bundy,J.E.
- Architectural style: Queen Anne
- NRHP reference No.: 91000920
- Added to NRHP: July 23, 1991

The Robert Dollar House is a residence at 115 J Street, San Rafael, California, United States. Designed by the Newsom Brothers, it was built in 1891 for shipping and timber magnate Robert Dollar as his first residence in Marin County.

== Description ==
The Robert Dollar House is located at 115 J Street in San Rafael, California, United States, at the corner with Forbes Street. The grounds include vegetation, such as fruit trees at the perimeter the lot and a palm tree along the path of the house's original driveway. The house spans 4,400 square feet (410 m^{2}) across two stories and an attic.

The first-story facade is clad with siding made of California redwood, and the second story has redwood trim and a shingled facade. The front facade has a bay with a gable and an arched bay window. On one side of this bay is the front porch, which has a pediment and double doors. There are double-hung windows on the other facades, along with a gazebo attached to the south facade, which dates from 1986. The house has a hip roof with shingles, interrupted by a pair of brick chimneys.

The interiors have ceiling medallions, which originally housed gas lamps; there is also redwood trim. The main (first) floor has a living room and dining room both with fireplaces, along with a kitchen pantry, and porches. The second floor has five bedrooms, plus a sun porch that functions as its own bedroom. The attic has two more bedrooms and a bathroom. Numerous modifications have been made over the years. Plumbing, mechanical systems, heating, and electrical wires date from after the original construction.

== History ==
The house was built in 1891 for the businessman Robert Dollar. It is one of two buildings in San Rafael that were definitely designed by the Newsom Brothers. In the early 20th century, the house was first electrified. Dollar moved out of the house to nearby 1408 Mission Avenue (later the Falkirk Cultural Center) in 1906. In the 1980s, the electrical wiring was updated, and heating and central mechanical systems were installed.

== See also ==
- National Register of Historic Places listings in Marin County, California

== Sources ==
- National Register of Historic Places Inventory/Nomination: Dollar, Robert, House (Report). National Park Service. July 23, 1991. With accompanying pictures
