= Falkirk Cultural Center =

Historic house in California, United States

- Robert Dollar Estate
- U.S. National Register of Historic Places
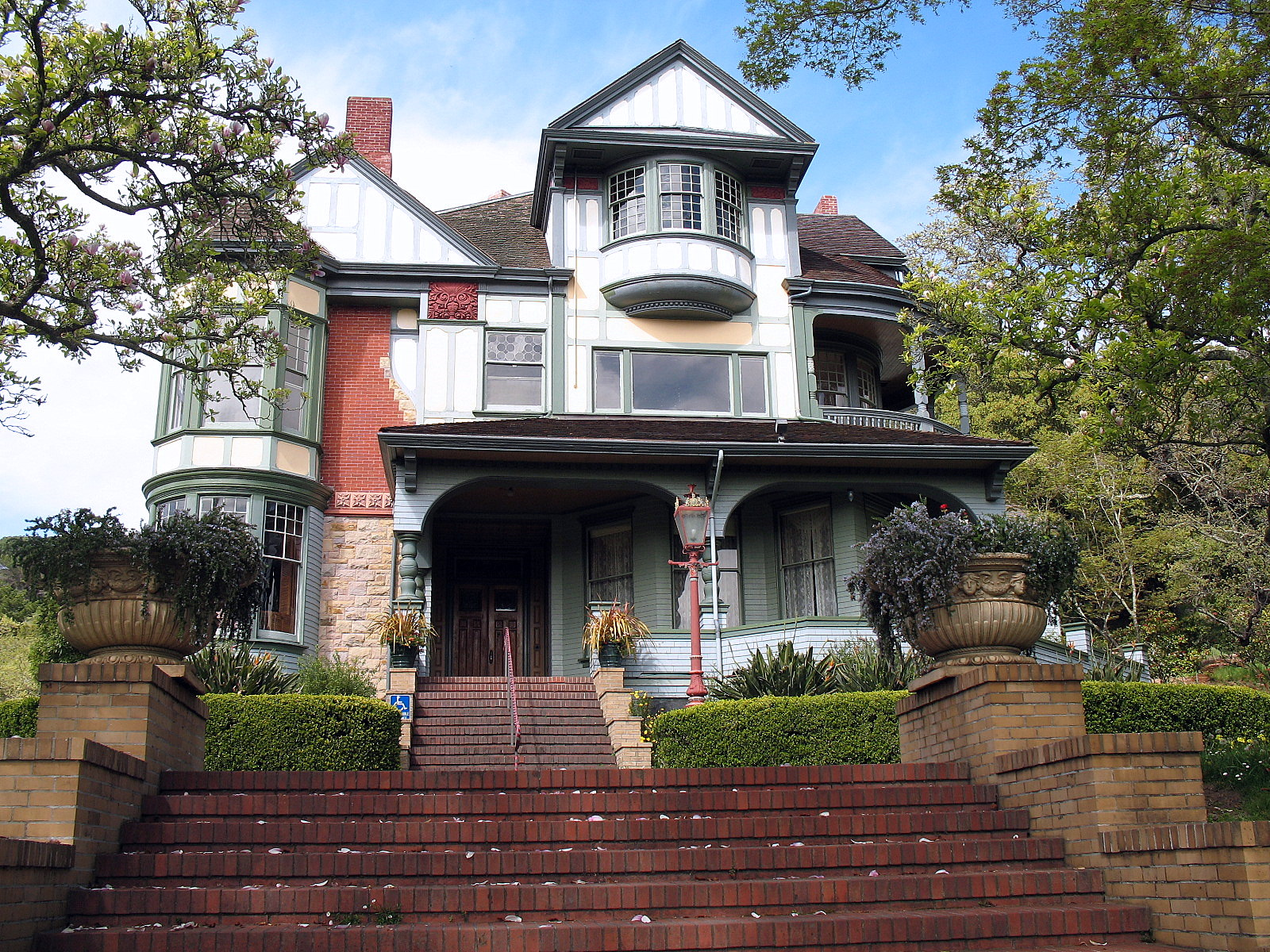

- Location within California Location within the United States
- Location: 1408 Mission Ave., San Rafael, California
- Coordinates: 37.975822°N 122.532108°W
- Area: 11.1 acres (4.5 ha)
- Built: 1888
- Architect: Clinton Day
- Architectural style: Queen Anne, Queen Anne-Eastlake
- NRHP reference No.: 72000237
- Added to NRHP: December 11, 1972

The Falkirk Cultural Center is a cultural center occupying the 11-acre (4.5 ha) Robert Dollar Estate at 1408 Mission Avenue, San Rafael, California, United States. It includes a three-story, 17-room mansion built in the Queen Anne and Eastlake styles. The mansion was originally built in 1888 for Ella Nichols Park, the widow of attorney Trenor W. Park, and was designed by architect Clinton Day. Scottish-born shipping and timber magnate Robert Dollar purchased the estate in 1906. It was expanded in the 1920s and became a cultural center in 1975. The estate is on the National Register of Historic Places.

== Description ==
The Falkirk Cultural Center is situated at 1408 Mission Avenue, occupying 11 acres (4.5 ha) in San Rafael, California, United States. Designed by Clinton Day in 1888, (Note: Other sources, however, date the building to 1879, during Walker's ownership.) the estate includes a three-story mansion. The house is accessed by a curved driveway leading from Mission Avenue, since it is set back about 150 feet (46 m) from the road. A footpath leads to small stairs flanked by Chinese guardian lions and urns. The grounds have hedges, flowers, lawns, and trees. Behind the house are about 5 acres (2.0 ha) of hilly forested land. When the industrialist Robert Dollar owned the house in the early 20th century, his family landscaped the grounds with details such as lawns, brick steps, and a pond, and they added a greenhouse and carriage house. The Boyd Gate House, also on the National Register of Historic Places, is to the east.

The mansion itself was built in the Queen Anne and Eastlake styles. The exterior is clad with shingle siding with Queen Anne-style wood paneling. There are several overhangs, in addition to oriel windows in multiple shapes, many of which are characteristic of the Queen Anne style. The rear has a 2-story wing.

Inside the house are 17 rooms. The first story has a central hall with a lozenge-shaped floor plan and a fireplace; above the fireplace is a staircase ascending to the second story. It includes a parlor, living room, and dining room. Two vestibules of different sizes, one on each side of the central hall, separate the living room from the other two rooms on that floor. The living room, dining room, and library share similar redwood ceilings and wainscoting. The living room's ceiling has a vault that protrudes 3 feet (0.91 m) above the other first-floor rooms' ceilings. The second- and third-floor rooms directly above the living room are raised slightly. The floors throughout are made of hardwood, and the house retains other features such as stained glass, seven oak fireplaces, curved windows, brocades, bronze builders' hardware, and ceramic doorknobs.

== History ==
=== Residential use ===
The mansion was one of several built in San Rafael, which by the 1880s had become an upper-class suburb of San Francisco. It was originally located on a site owned by railroad magnate James D. Walker. The mansion was built for Ella Nichols Park, whose husband, the attorney Trenor W. Park, had died in 1882. Park purchased 11 acres (4.5 ha) in San Rafael from Walker in 1886. and hired prominent San Francisco architect Clinton Day. The house was completed in August 1888 for $30,000.

Scottish-born shipping and timber magnate Robert Dollar—who had previously lived at the nearby Robert Dollar House, which he had built in 1891—purchased the estate in 1906. Dollar subsequently renamed the estate Falkirk, the name of his hometown in Scotland. The Dollar family used the house for events such as parties from the 1900s to the 1920s. Among the final events the Dollars hosted there was a 500-person party for Robert's 50th anniversary in 1924, to which the Dollars' American relatives were all invited. Around 10 acres (4.0 ha) of the grass was burned in a fire in 1926. A two-story addition was also built at the house's rear in 1925 or 1927. During this time, the Dollars added a garden, pond, and brick steps.

Dollar died in 1932, and his assets, including Falkirk, were later sold off to pay off debt. Shortly after Dollar's death, his widow Agnes received ransom notes demanding money, prompting the Dollars to place security around the mansion. The house was occupied by the Hickingbotham family by the 1960s. By 1972, the house was in danger of being demolished to make way for a residential development proposed by Thomas E. Schaal, when the city's planning commission postponed consideration of Schaal's proposal. That year, city councilman Lawrence F. Mulryan proposed that the San Rafael government purchase the mansion as part of its ongoing redevelopment plan. The house was added to the National Register of Historic Places.

=== Cultural center ===
In 1974, the city organized a voter referendum to determine whether the city government should buy the house; known as Proposition G, the referendum entailed increasing property taxes to fund the purchase. To encourage voters to approve the proposition, a committee hosted tours of the house that October. Later that year, San Rafael residents approved Proposition G, and an open house was hosted for residents. The following year, the city began sponsoring concerts in the house, and it began planning an art gallery inside. The San Rafael Cultural Affairs Commission proposed restoring the mansion's facade and interior, displaying furnishings in the lower-story rooms, renovating the 1927 annex, and allowing San Rafael residents (but not other people) to use the house for private events.

Proposition 13, passed in 1978, rescinded the tax increase that had been approved for Falkirk. Afterward, the San Rafael government funded Falkirk Cultural Center from its general funds. In 1997, Alice Dollar Hayden donated $25,000 to be used for the house's restoration. Subsequently, ARG Conservation Service renovated the Robert Dollar Estate's parlor in 2006. By the 21st century, the house functioned as a community center, historical center, concert hall, museum, and art gallery. It hosted programs and activities such as a schoolchildren's art program, summer camp, art shows, and Easter egg hunts.

== See also ==
- National Register of Historic Places listings in Marin County, California

== Sources ==
- "National Register of Historic Places Inventory/Nomination: Dollar, Robert, Estate". National Park Service. 1972. With accompanying pictures
