= Bradford House II =

- U.S. National Register of Historic Places
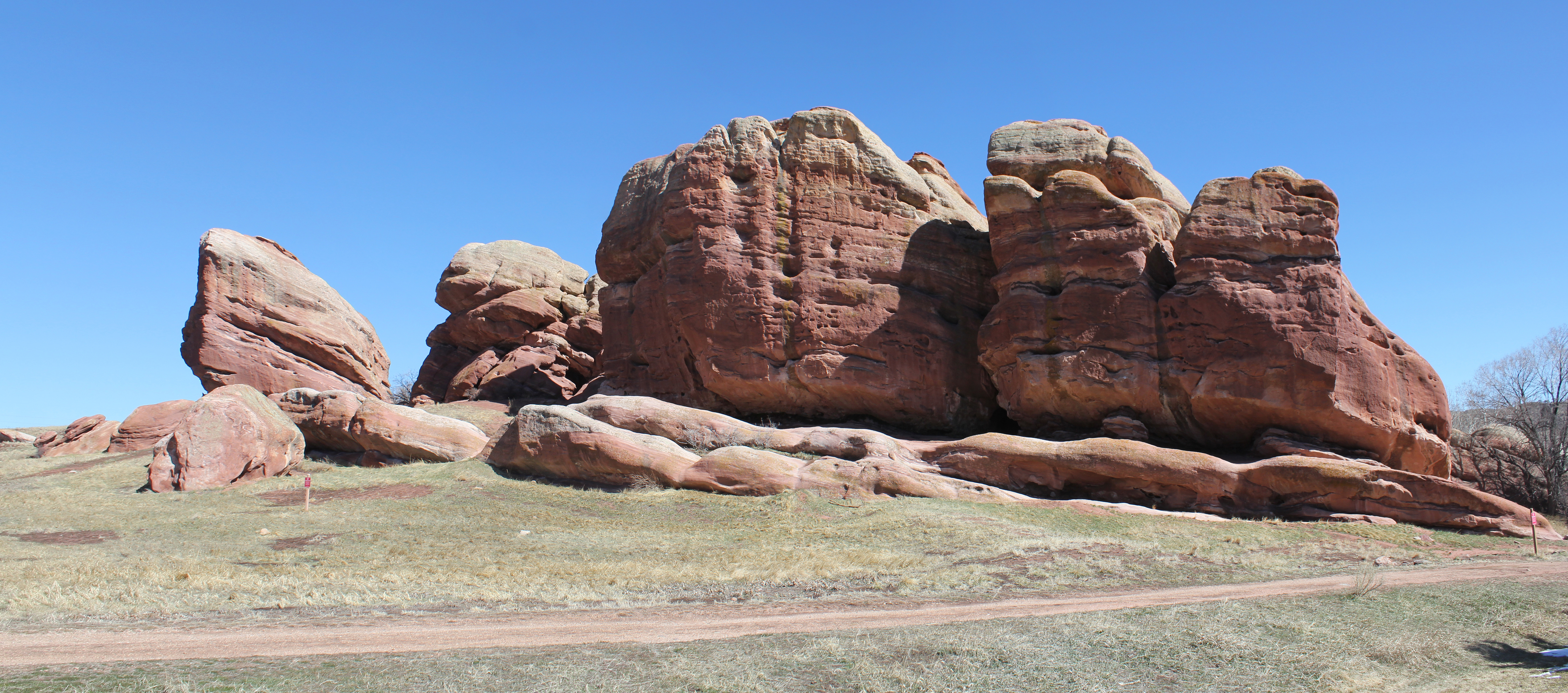
- The Bradford House II archaeological site, located at the end of Kildeer Lane in Ken Caryl, Jefferson County, Colorado. The site is also known by this number: 5KF51.

- Location within Colorado Location within the United States
- Nearest city: Littleton, Colorado
- Coordinates: 39°36′7″N 105°10′19″W
- Area: less than one acre
- NRHP reference No.: 01000031
- Added to NRHP: February 2, 2001

Bradford House II (Site 5JF51) is a prehistoric rockshelter, 24 kilometres (15 mi) southwest of Denver. It is situated on land owned by the Ken-Caryl Ranch Master Association. It was excavated in the summer and fall of 1973 by the Denver Chapter of the Colorado Archaeological Society. The excavations found several cultural features and recovered thousands of chipped stone artifacts, dozens of ground stone artifacts, a few ceramic sherds, bone tools, and faunal remains. The site was used by prehistoric groups during the Middle and Late Archaic periods, as well as the Early Woodland, and Middle Woodland periods. This is a span of 4,500 years. Bradford House II is located in the Ken-Caryl Valley. The Front Range foothills to the west and the Lyons and Dakota hogbacks to the east frame the valley. An abundance of archaeological sites, attests to the valley's attraction for the earliest inhabitants of the area. They frequented the area for its abundant resources, including shelter under the many bedrock monoliths scattered across the valley, lithic materials for chipped stone tools, and edible plants and animals. West of the valley, the arkosic sandstones of the Pennsylvanian Fountain formation lie unconformably upon uplifted Precambrian metamorphic rocks of the Front Range (Rathbun 1997:21) . Although mostly covered by recent to pre-Wisconsin alluvium, the Fountain formation forms southwest facing escarpments, or monoliths, with undercut shelters or caves (Rathbun 1997:21), many of which were inhabited by prehistoric peoples. The elevation of the site is approximately 1878 m (6160 ft.) above mean sea level. Elevations surrounding the site range from about 1828 m (6000 ft.) in the Dutch Creek water gap to 1992 m (6536 ft.) on the highest point of the Dakota hogback ridge. The valley has a sunny, mild, and semiarid climate that has neither the extreme cold of the higher elevations to the west nor the hot summer afternoons of the eastern plains (Tate 1997:15). A south-facing rock shelter like Bradford House II absorbs a great deal of solar radiation, further mitigating the winter cold. Precipitation is moderate, averaging 15 to 18 inches, and winter snows melt quickly (Tate 1997:17) with frequent down slope (chinook) winds. The valley consists of various grasses and forbs. The surrounding hogbacks and foothills support a pine-Douglas fir vegetation community. The recovery of floral materials from Bradford House II and other archaeological sites in the valley (Johnson 1997:Table Gl) indicates that local plants such as sunflower, wild plum, acorn, and chokecherry were gathered and used by prehistoric peoples. Many animals, including elk, mule deer, and occasional Big Horn sheep, as well as a variety of carnivores, rabbits, rodents, birds, amphibians, reptiles, and fish are found in the hogbacks and foothills. Unworked animal, mostly mammal, bone was found in abundance in the Archaic and Early Ceramic levels (Johnson and Lyons 1997a:49, Table 6). Mule deer dominates the assemblage, followed by elk, bison, and rabbit, with little change in dietary preferences from the earlier to later time periods. Several bone tools (awls, beads, reamers, bone scrapers, and bone drills) and antler flakers were recovered from all cultural levels in the site (Johnson and Lyons 1997a) .

== Bibliography ==
- Chenault, Mark L., 1999 Introduction. In Colorado Prehistory: A Context for the Platte River Basin, by Kevin P. Gilmore, Marcia J. Tate, Mark L. Chenault, Bonnie Clark, Terri McBridge, and Margaret Wood, pp. 1–5. Colorado Council of Professional Archaeologists, Denver.
- Prison, George C., 1991 Prehistoric Hunters of the High Plains. 2" ed. Academic Press, Inc., New York.
- Gilmore, Kevin P., 1999 Late Prehistoric Stage (A.D. 150–1540). In Colorado Prehistory: A Context for the Platte River Basin, by Kevin P. Gilmore, Marcia J. Tate, Mark L. Chenault, Bonnie Clark, Terri McBridge, and Margaret Wood, pp. 175–307. Colorado Council of Professional Archaeologists, Denver.
- Gilmore, Kevin P., Marcia Tate, Mark L. Chenault, Bonnie Clark, Terri McBride, and Margaret Wood 1999 Colorado Prehistory: A Context for the Platte River Basin. Colorado Council of Professional Archaeologists, Denver.
- Irwin-Williams, Cynthia and Henry J. Irwin, 1966 Excavations at Magic Mountain. A Diachronic Study of Plains-Southwest Relations. Proceedings No. 12. Denver Museum of Natural History, Denver.
- Johnson, Ann M., 1997 Floral Materials Recovered from 5JF51 and 5JF52. Appendix G in Archaeological Investigations at the Ken-Caryl Ranch, Colorado, by Ann M. Johnson and Others, pp. 214–217. Memoir No. 6. Colorado Archaeological Society, Denver.
- Johnson, Ann M. and Ray D. Lyons, 1997a Bradford House II Site (5JF51). In Archaeological Investigations at the Ken-Caryl Ranch, Colorado, by Ann M. Johnson and Others, pp. 33–54. Memoir No. 6. Colorado Archaeological Society, Denver.
- Johnson, Ann M. and Ray D. Lyons, 1997b Bradford House III Site (5JF52). In Archaeological Investigations at the Ken-Caryl Ranch, Colorado, by Ann M. Johnson and Others, pp. 55–92. Memoir No. 6. Colorado Archaeological Society, Denver
- Johnson, Ann M. and Others, 1997 Archaeological Investigations at the Ken-Caryl Ranch, Colorado. Memoir No. 6. Colorado Archaeological Society, Denver.
- Johnson, Ann M., J. Frank Adkins, Fred C. Rathbun, Ray D. Lyons, and Diane Rhodes, 1997 Discussion. In Archaeological Investigations at the Ken-Caryl Ranch, Colorado, by Ann M. Johnson and Others, pp. 134–152. Memoir No. 6. Colorado Archaeological Society, Denver.
- Kalasz, Stephen M. and Wm. Lane Shields, 1997 Report of 1994/1996 Grid Block Archaeological Excavations at the Magic Mountain Site (5JF223) in Jefferson County, Colorado. Unpublished report prepared for the Colorado Historical Society by Centennial Archaeology, Inc., Fort Collins, Colorado.
- Ludlow, Mark, 1997 Fauna of the Ken-Caryl Ranch. In Archaeological Investigations at the Ken-Caryl Ranch, Colorado, by Ann M. Johnson and Others, Appendix A, pp. 161–164. Memoir No. 6. Colorado Archaeological Society, Denver.
- Price, Alan E. and Alan E. Amen, 1983 Soil Survey of Golden Area, Colorado. Parts of Denver, Douglas, Jefferson, and Park Counties. USDA Soil Conservation Service. U.S. Government Printing Office, Washington, D.C.
- Rathbun, Fred C., 1997a Ken-Caryl Geological Traverse. In Archaeological Investigations at the Ken-Caryl Ranch, Colorado, by Ann M. Johnson and Others, pp. 21–24. Memoir No. 6. Colorado Archaeological Society, Denver.
- Rathbun, Fred C., 1997b Geological Framework for the Archaeology for the Ken-Caryl Ranch Area, Jefferson County, Colorado. Appendix C in Archaeological Investigations at the Ken-Caryl Ranch, Colorado, by
- Ann M. Johnson and Others, pp. 21–24. Memoir No. 6. Colorado Archaeological Society, Denver.
- Richardson, Charles, 1974 Summary of Excavations at the Ken Caryl Ranch, 1973. Southwestern Lore 40 (3&4): 48–49.
- Tate, William H., 1997 The Climatology of the Ken-Caryl Ranch Archaeological District. In Archaeological Investigations at the Ken-Caryl Ranch, Colorado, by Ann M. Johnson and Others, pp. 15–20. Memoir No. 6. Colorado Archaeological Society, Denver.
- Tate, Marcia J., 1999 Archaic Stage. In Colorado Prehistory: A Context for the Platte River Basin, by Kevin Gilmore, Marcia Tate, Mark L. Chenault, Bonnie Clark, Terri McBride, and Margaret Wood, pp. 91–73. Colorado Council of Professional Archaeologists, Denver.
- Tate, Marcia J. and Kevin P. Gilmore, 1999 Environment. In Colorado Prehistory: A Context for the Platte River Basin, by Kevin P. Gilmore, Marcia Tate, Mark L. Chenault, Bonnie Clark, Terri McBridge, and Margaret Wood, pp. 7–40. Colorado Council of Professional Archaeologists, Denver.
