= Casa Madrona =

Historic house in California, United States

- William G. Barrett House
- U.S. National Register of Historic Places
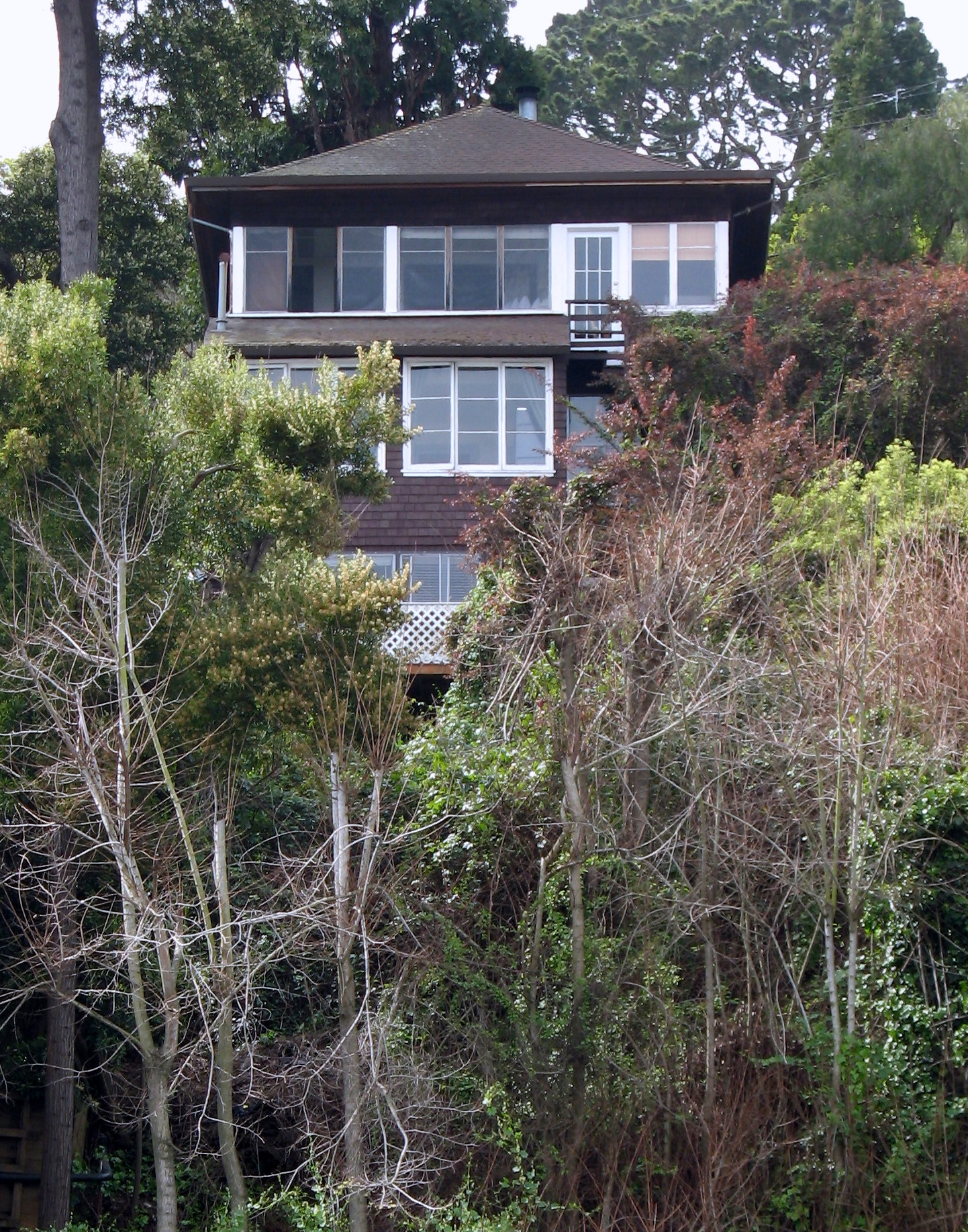

- Location within San Francisco Bay Area Location within California Location within the United States
- Location: 156 Bulkley Avenue, Sausalito, California, US
- Coordinates: 37°51′26″N 122°28′49″W
- Area: 0.5 acres (0.20 ha)
- Built: 1885
- Architectural style: Italianate
- NRHP reference No.: 80004490
- Added to NRHP: June 17, 1980

Casa Madrona is a hotel at 156 Bulkley Avenue in Sausalito, California, United States. It includes the William G. Barrett House, an Italianate-style house built in 1885 as the oldest house in Sausalito. The house, sitting on a hillside, is three stories high and has a wood-siding facade with a hip roof; its original owner, the Barrett family, occupied the house until 1902. The hotel opened in 1910 and has been repeatedly resold since then. In the 1980s, a series of cottages were constructed on the hillside. The Barrett House is on the National Register of Historic Places.

== Description ==
Casa Madrona is located on a hillside at 156 Bulkley Avenue in Sausalito, California, United States. Its original section, the William G. Barrett House, is three stories high, with a brick-and-concrete foundation and a wood-siding facade. It is designed in the Italianate style.

Below the Barrett House are a series of New England-style cottages with gables and porches, built as part of the modern-day Casa Madrona Hotel. Following an expansion in the 1980s, Casa Madrona had 13 rooms in the Barrett House, 17 rooms in the addition, and four standalone cottages. Jerry Hulse of the Los Angeles Times designed the hotel as "a pleasing array of gray-blue New England-style units that appear to have been picked off the storm-tossed coast of Maine and transplanted here".

=== William G. Barrett House ===
The Barrett House has two entrances, both with porticoes. The main entrance is from uphill, which leads to the second story of the rear (west) facade, and has a porch on either side. The secondary entrance is from the side (south) facade. There is a veranda on the first story of the front (east) facade. For the most part, the facade has double-hung windows with windowsills, which are separated vertically by pilasters. The windows on the second floor, except on its front facade, are flanked by brackets, which support window hoods. A cornice runs directly above the third story, above which is a hip roof with a low pitch and broad eaves. The roof has a false gable on its front facade, and there are three chimneys protruding from it.

Inside, the house spans about 6,600 square feet (610 m^{2}) and has 35 rooms. The entrance hall is long and narrow, and it contains a staircase leading both up to the third story and down to the first story. Throughout the house are door frames with circular motifs at their corners, and fluting on their frames; there are also sliding privacy doors. The walls have fluted baseboards and wooden trim and wainscoting. As of 2014, the house includes a guestroom suite called the Alexandrite Suite. This suite includes 5,000 square feet (460 m^{2}) of guestroom area, of which 3,500 square feet (330 m^{2}) is inside the house and 1,500 square feet (140 m^{2}) is on a deck. The house also has 1,700 square feet (160 m^{2}) of event venue space.

== History ==
The Barrett House was completed in 1885 for businessman William G. Barrett. The Sausalito News called the site "one of the finest improved sites in Sausalito". The Barretts occupied the home until 1902, after which it was used as a guest house.

=== Hotel conversion ===
In 1910, attorney John Gallagher bought the house, which became a hotel called Casa Madrona. Under Gallagher's ownership, the house functioned as a hotel and allegedly a brothel. Floyd Allensby acquired the house just prior to World War II. Casa Madrona accommodated soldiers' families during the war, then became dilapidated in the years afterward. After the war, Casa Madrona was a popular meeting space for counterculture. By 1957, the hotel was owned by Maurice Turidi, and the Sausalito town government found that the hotel's poor condition invited rats "as big as cats". The Los Angeles Times wrote that the building had become "a beer hall and boardinghouse for the flower children of a seemingly lost generation".

Robert Deschamps took over operation of Casa Madrona in 1959. Deschamps, via an oral contract, leased the house and surroundings from Allensby and opened Le Vivoir Restaurant there. Over the next 15 years, Deschamps and his family spent $80,000 extensively renovating the house, turning it into an upscale hotel that attracted guests from across California, as well as from farther-flung locales such as New York and Paris. Visitors included actor Dick Van Dyke and his first wife Margie, who stayed for their second wedding anniversary in 1966; Le Vivoir, which was undergoing renovations at the time, was reopened specifically for them. Jerry Hulse wrote for the Herald Statesman in 1970 that the house was "a French country inn with a Spanish accent", and the Los Angeles Times wrote the next year that the hotel had a "French atmosphere". At the time, the Barrett House was Sausalito's oldest surviving residence. The hotel was variously cited as containing 10 or 12 rooms, all within the Barrett House.

=== Mudslide damage and expansions ===
The house's foundation was weakened by a mudslide following heavy rains in 1972, and part of the house was subsequently declared unstable. Allensby died the next year, and Crocker National Bank took over the house from Allensby's estate, Crocker initially refused to repair the mudslide damage. By 1973, the house was in danger of falling down the hill, and Sausalito's city council voted to study the possibility of condemning the property. The owner also wanted to condemn the property, but both Deschamps and local residents opposed the move. In response, local residents raised $14,000 to help fund repairs. The city council ordered Crocker to fix the damage in January 1974, and the bank attempted to evict Deschamps the same year. Although the mudslide had not caused cracking in the structure, the exterior had deteriorated, with paint flaking off the exterior.

Deschamps ultimately continued to lease the hotel until July 1976, when the bank refused to renew his lease. The same year, preservationists successfully convinced the city government to designate the house as a local landmark, and John Mays bought the house. Mays subsequently proposed expanding the hotel with several structures on the slope below the house. These plans triggered opposition from local residents. The Barrett House was added to the National Register of Historic Places in 1980. During the construction of the expansion, Sausalito experienced another major storm, which nearly destabilized the hotel again. The Casa Madrona addition, which cost $3 million, was completed in 1982. The Le Vivoir restaurant remained in operation but was called simply the Casa Madrona restaurant.

By the late 1980s, The Hartford Courant described Casa Madrona as one of two bed and breakfast–style inns in Sausalito, of the three small hotels then operating there, but Hulse said it was no longer a bed-and-breakfast due to the expanded breadth of the hotel's operations. Olympus Real Estate Corp. bought Casa Madrona in 1999, at which point the whole hotel complex had 34 rooms. Vail Resorts acquired Casa Madrona in 2001 as part of its purchase of Olympus's properties. Guy Mitchell bought the hotel in 2005 for $12 million. The hotel had gone into bankruptcy by 2009, after which Prism Hotels & Resorts took over as interim manager, and Mitchell was subsequently investigated for bribery. The hotel was renovated again in 2014. As part of this renovation, 11 rooms were renovated in the Barrett House, becoming the Alexandrite Suite. By then, part of the house had an event venue space. In 2019, Casa Madrona was again renovated, and a lobby, coworking space, courtyard, and fitness and wellness rooms were added.

== See also ==
- National Register of Historic Places listings in Marin County, California

== Sources ==
- National Register of Historic Places Inventory/Nomination: William G. Barrett House (Report). National Park Service. 1980. With accompanying pictures
