= Sausalito Woman's Club =

- U.S. National Register of Historic Places
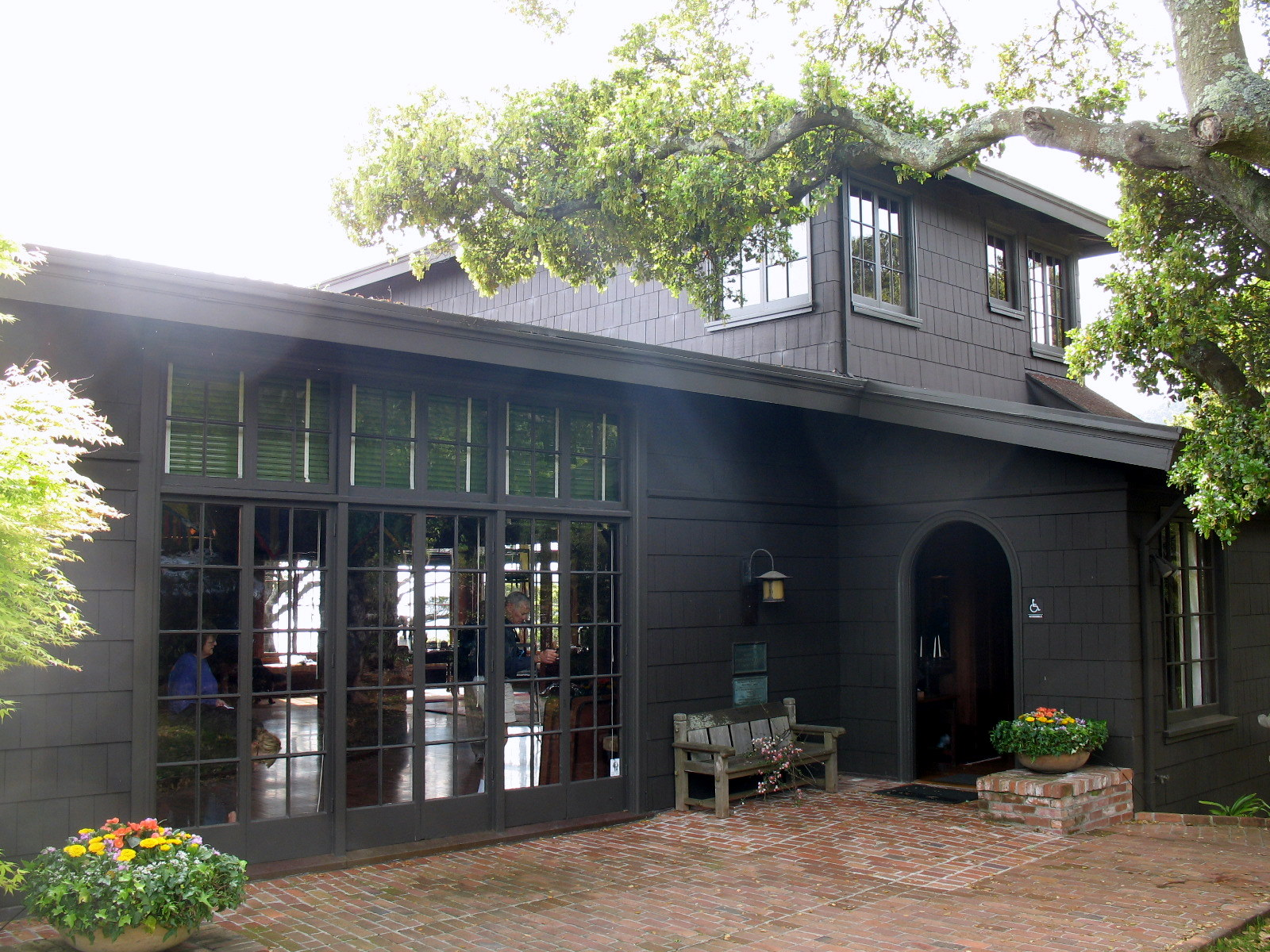

- Location within California
- Location: 120 Central Ave., Sausalito, California
- Coordinates: 37°51′07″N 122°28′51″W
- Area: less than one acre
- Built: 1918
- Architect: Julia Morgan
- Architectural style: Bungalow/craftsman, Bay Area Tradition
- NRHP reference No.: 93000272
- Added to NRHP: April 15, 1993

The Sausalito Woman's Club, at 120 Central Avenue in Sausalito, Marin County, California, was built in 1918. It was designed by Bay Area architect Julia Morgan. It was listed on the National Register of Historic Places in 1993.

It is a Craftsman-style building, of irregular plan with 18 corners.

Funds for the women's club to have a clubhouse were raised during 1913 to 1918.

The building was declared Sausalito's Historical Landmark #1 in 1976.

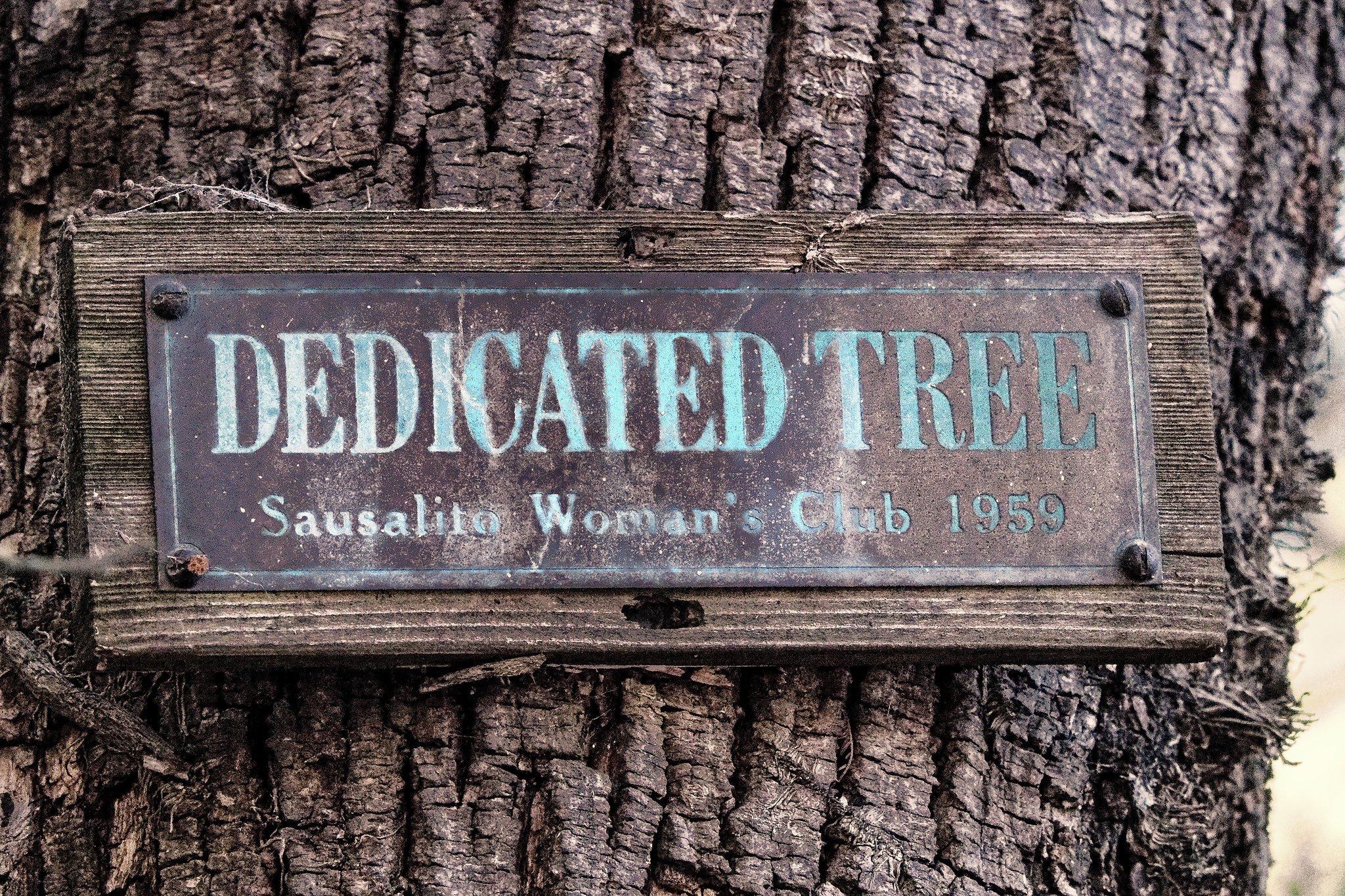
Plaque on tree from 1959, still visible as of 2023.

Many works big and small of the Woman's club are still visible today in Sausalito, such as the plaque on a tree from 1959 as seen in March 2023 (see picture).

== See also ==
- List of works by Julia Morgan
- National Register of Historic Places listings in Marin County, California
