= Olema Valley Dairy Ranches Historic District =

- U.S. National Register of Historic Places
- Location within California
- Location: Point Reyes NS & Golden Gate NRA, near Olema, California
- Coordinates: 38.00115°N 122.74987°W
- Area: 14,127 acres (57.17 km^{2})
- NRHP reference No.: 100002286
- Added to NRHP: April 9, 2018

The Olema Valley Dairy Ranches Historic District is one of six Point Reyes sites listed on the National Register of Historic Places in 2018. It is a 14,127 acres (57.17 km^{2}) historic district which was listed on April 9, 2018.

The district includes 19 of the working ranches in the area from Point Reyes Station to Bolinas and includes more than 14,000 acres.

According to D.S. Livingston in 1995, "Despite its status as a National Recreation Area, virtually all of the Olema Valley retains its historic rural ranching character. The former dairy ranches, many with pioneer structures intact, continue to thrive under the stewardship of families who have been here for generations."
