= St. Vincent's School for Boys =

Saint Vincent's School for Boys
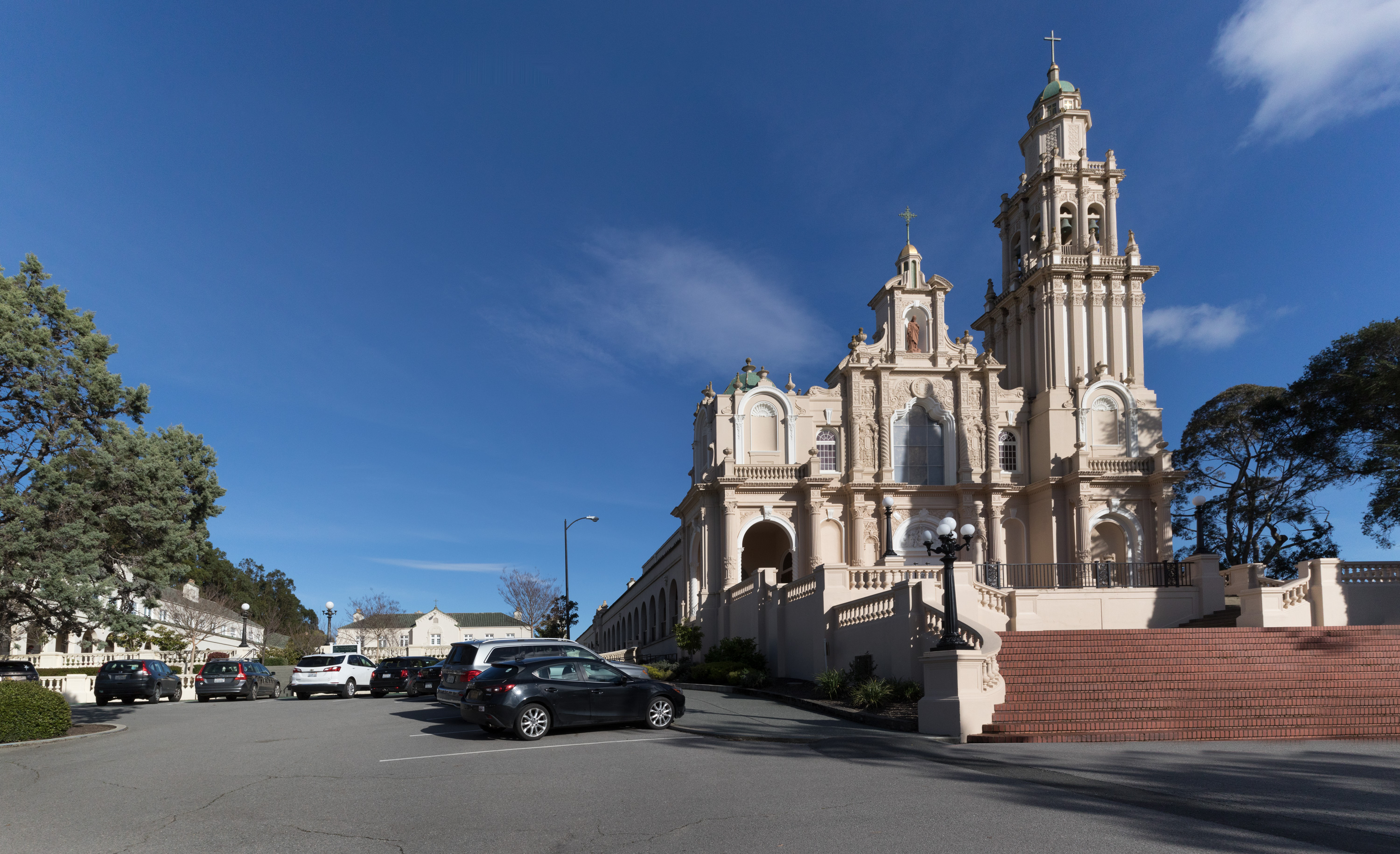
- Most Holy Rosary Chapel
- Interactive map of Saint Vincent's School for Boys
- Location: Marin County, California, 4 miles (6.4 km) N of San Rafael
- Coordinates: 38.0347°N 122.5255°W

California Historical Landmark
- Designated: January 29, 1958
- Reference no.: 630

St. Vincent's School for Boys is a Catholic boys home in Marin County, California, founded in 1855 by the Daughters of Charity of Saint Vincent de Paul. It has been maintained and enlarged by subsequent Archbishops of San Francisco.

As of 2021, it was a licensed 52-bed Short Term Residential Therapy Program (STRTP) serving boys age 7 to 18 referred by county public health agencies and in-patient psychiatric hospitals throughout Northern California.

The property, which includes Most Holy Rosary Chapel, an ornate Catholic church on campus, is located near the city of San Rafael. It is one of the oldest institutions west of the Mississippi dedicated exclusively to therapeutic and compassionate care of traumatized boys, and was recognized as a California State Historical Landmark in 1958. Most Holy Rosary Chapel is currently operated by the Institute of Christ the King Sovereign Priest.

The Saint Vincent Station, a nearby railroad stop on the Northwestern Pacific Railroad, was named after the school, as was the Saint Vincent post office that operated there from 1896 to 1922.
