= Bradford House (San Rafael, California) =

Historic house in California, United States

- U.S. National Register of Historic Places
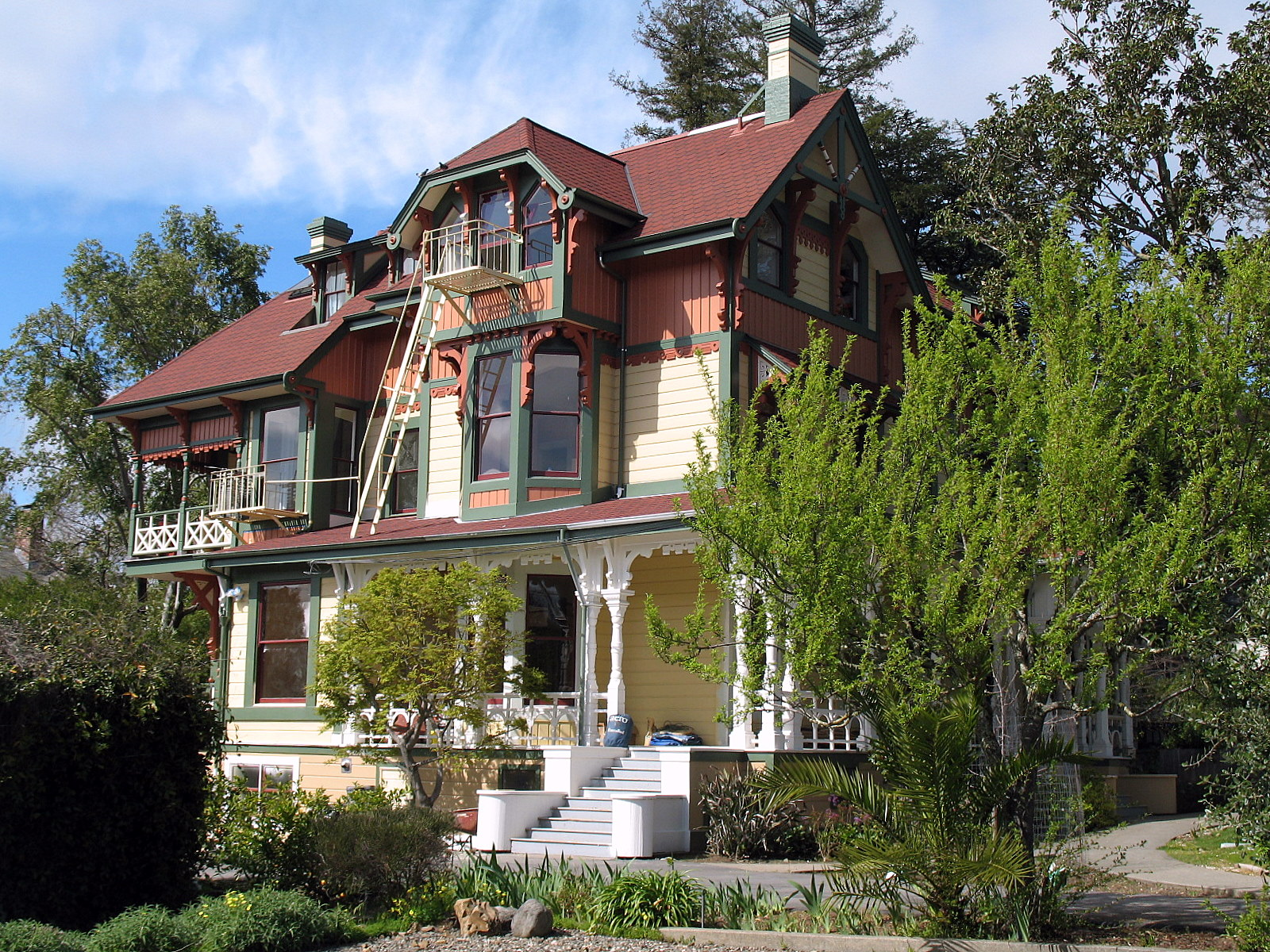

- Location within California
- Location: 333 G St., San Rafael, California
- Coordinates: 37°58′37″N 122°32′13″W
- Area: 0.4 acres (0.16 ha)
- Built: 1883
- Architectural style: Stick/eastlake
- NRHP reference No.: 80000818
- Added to NRHP: June 6, 1980

The Bradford House in San Rafael, California, also known as Bradford Manor or as Bradford/Sharp House, was built in 1883. It was listed on the National Register of Historic Places in 1980.

It was deemed "an exceptional example of Stick/Eastlake style." It is a two-and-a-half-story mansion built largely of redwood, and is about 60 by 56 feet (18 m × 17 m) in plan. It is asymmetrical on all floors, with a veranda, some porches, and a steep and complex roof.

It was built for William Bushnell Bradford and his wife Pauline Bradford, and is located in a cul de sac at 333 G Street, in the park-like Forbes Addition area about .25 miles (0.40 km) northwest of downtown San Rafael.

Descendants sold the home in 1916 and it was later divided into seven apartments.
