= Outdoor Art Club =

Historical Landmark in Mill Valley, California, United States

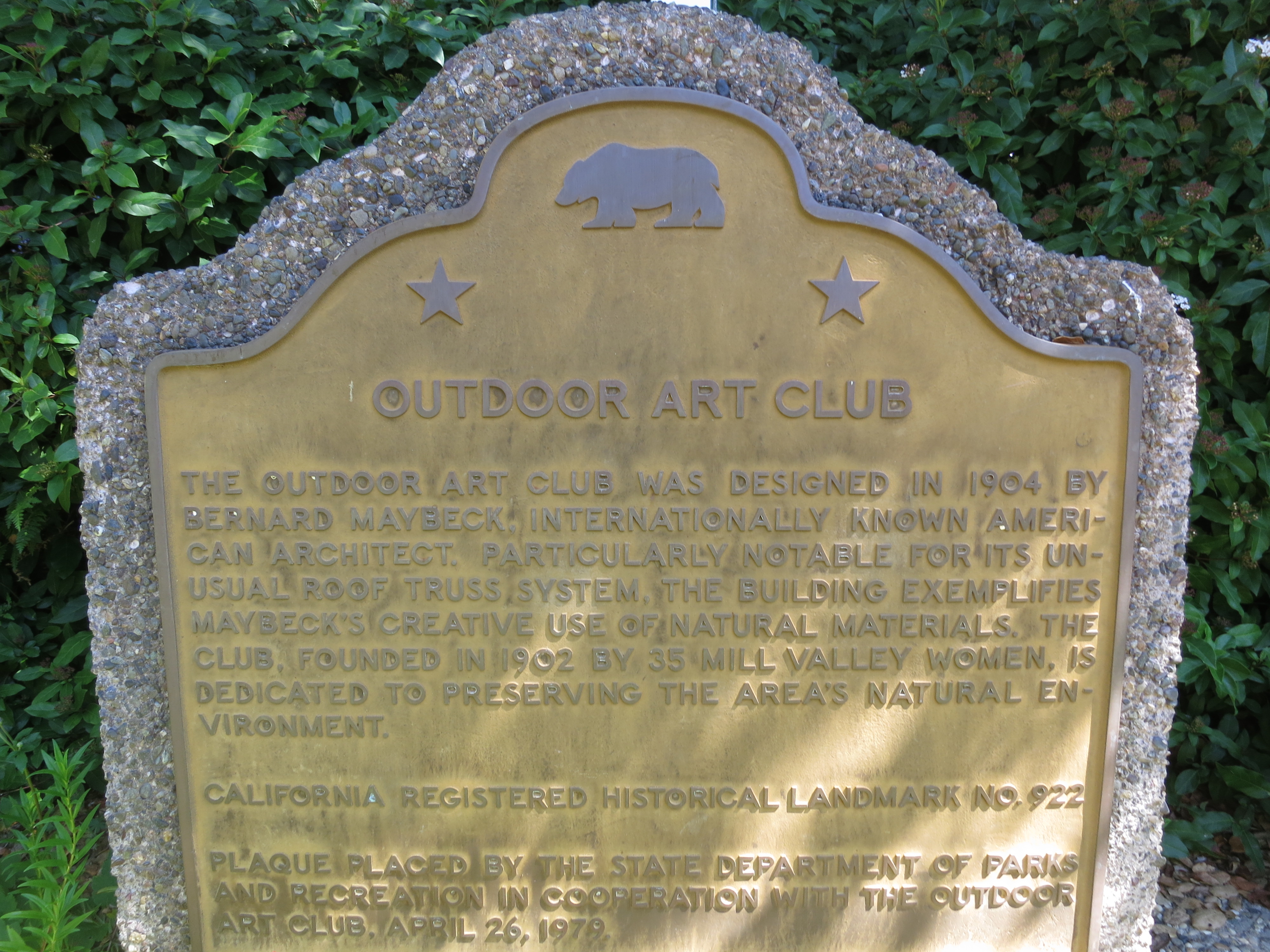
- Historical Landmark marker

- Location within California Location within the United States
- 37.906°N 122.546°W
- Location: 1 W Blithedale Ave, Mill Valley, California

History
- Built: 1904

Site notes
- Architect: Bernard Maybeck

California Historical Landmark
- Reference no.: 922

Outdoor Art Club Building is a Historical Landmark Building in Mill Valley, California in Marin County. The building and grounds were designed by American architect, Bernard Maybeck in 1904. Maybeck is known for his use of natural materials in creative ways. The Outdoor Art Club Building is noted for its unique roof truss system. The Outdoor Art Club Building is a California Historical Landmark No. 922, listed on October 15, 1978. The Outdoor Art Club Building is located at 1 W Blithedale Ave, Mill Valley, California.

== Outdoor Art Club ==
The Outdoor Art Club is dedicated to preserving the area's natural environment. The Outdoor Art Club was founded by 35 Mill Valley women in 1902. The 35 were concerned about the removal of large redwood treess near the Mill Valley train depot. The club has worked to preserve natural environments and done community service projects. Due to its beauty, the building is often used for weddings.

== Gallery ==
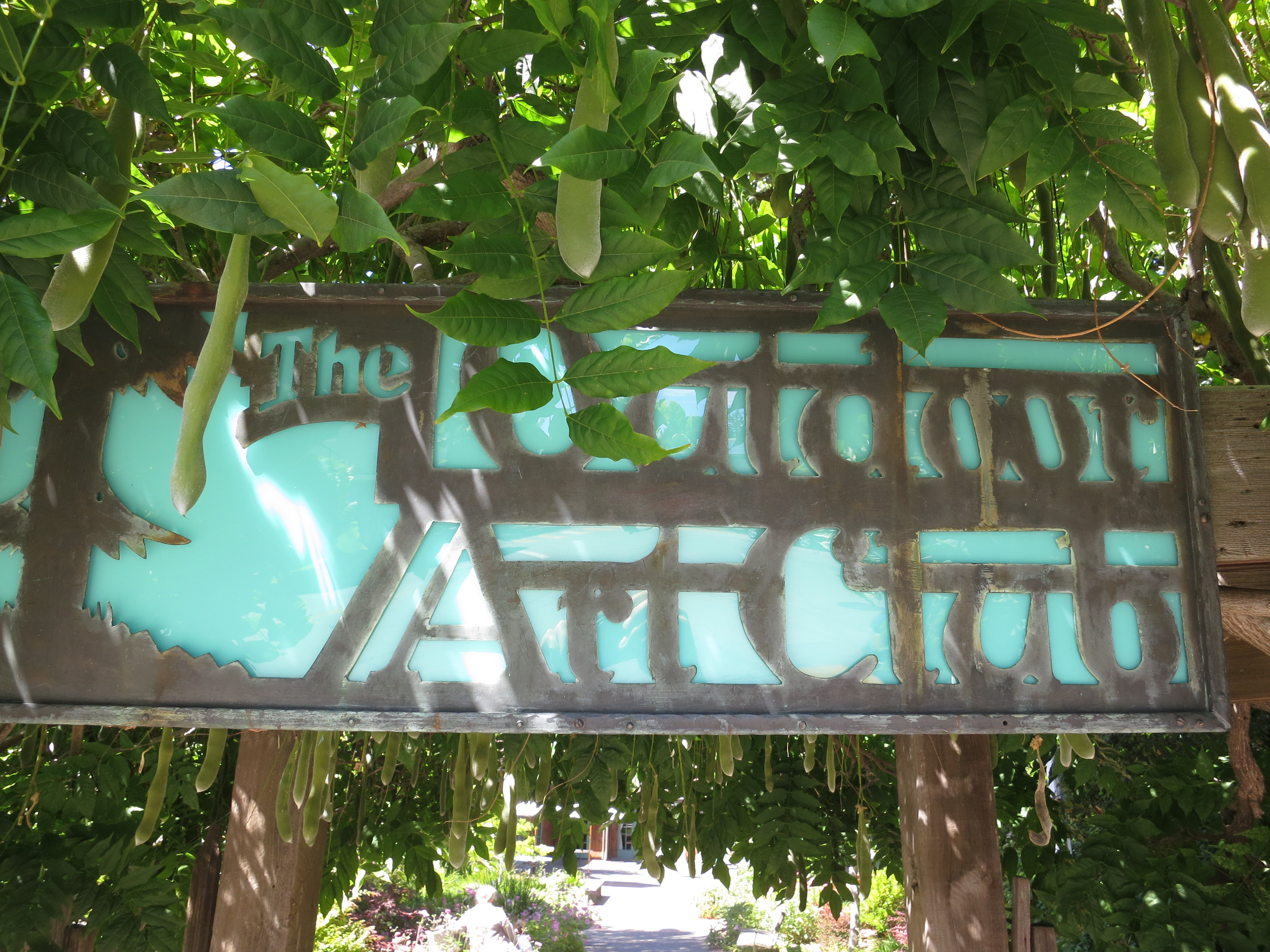

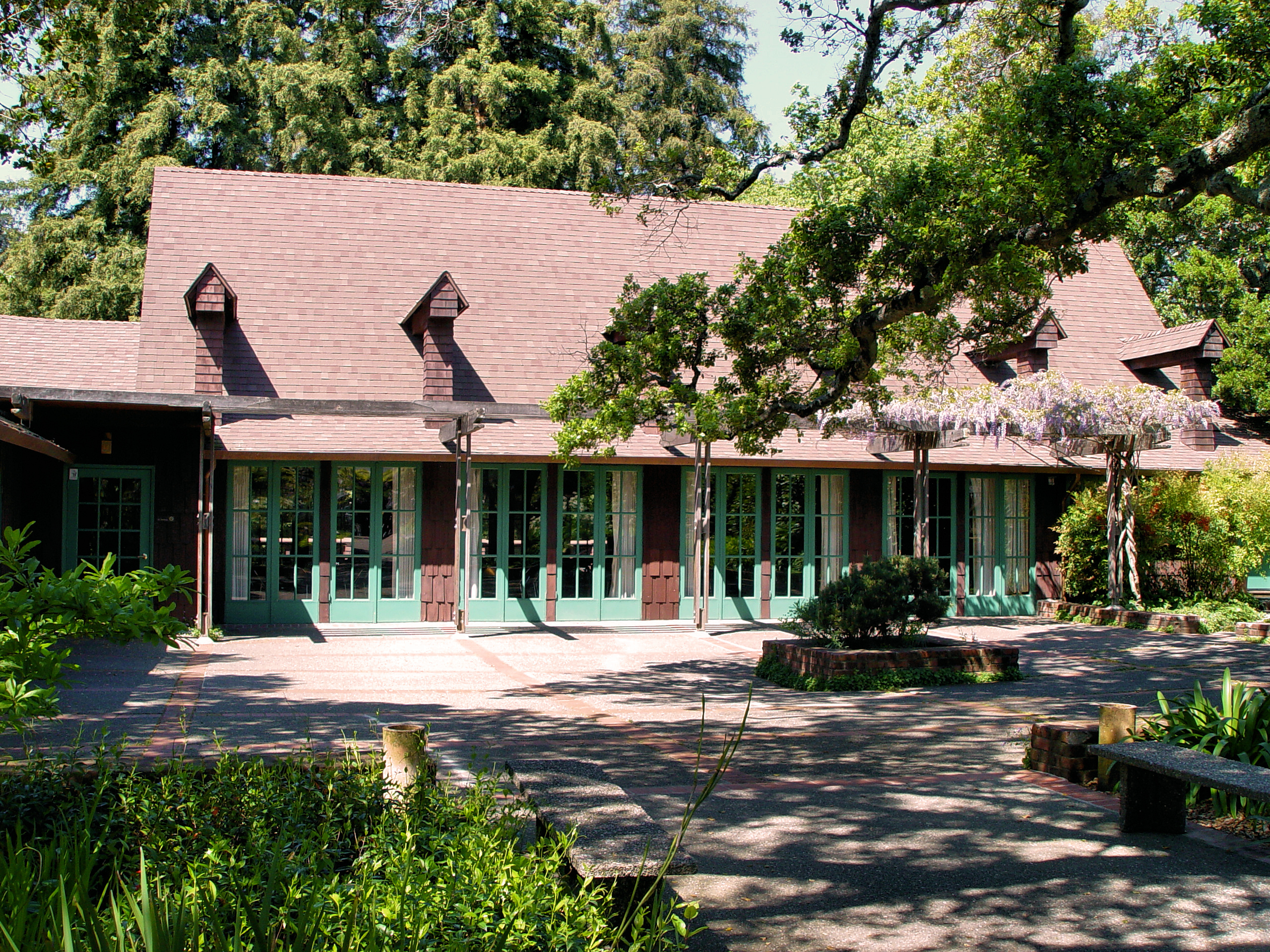

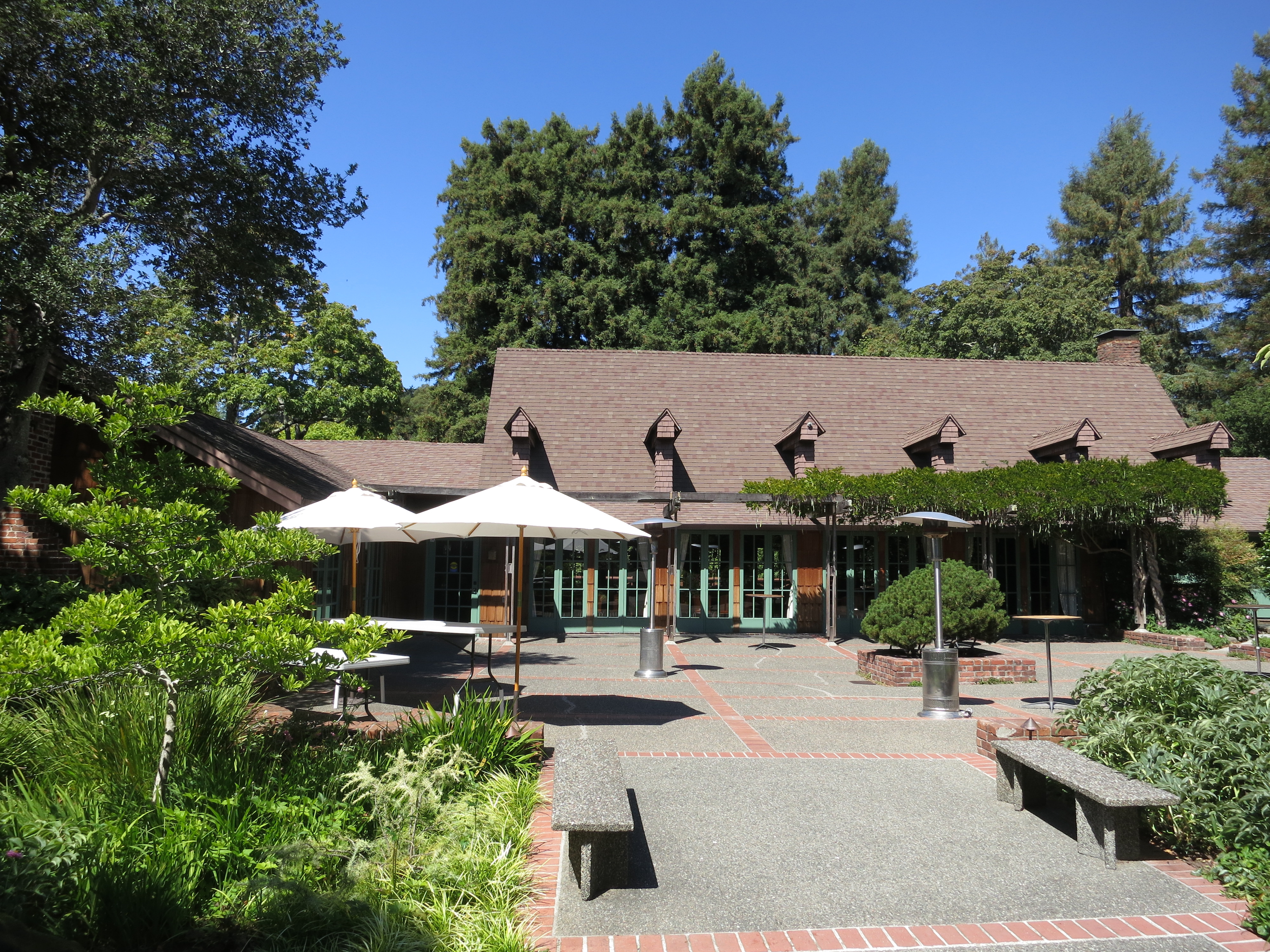

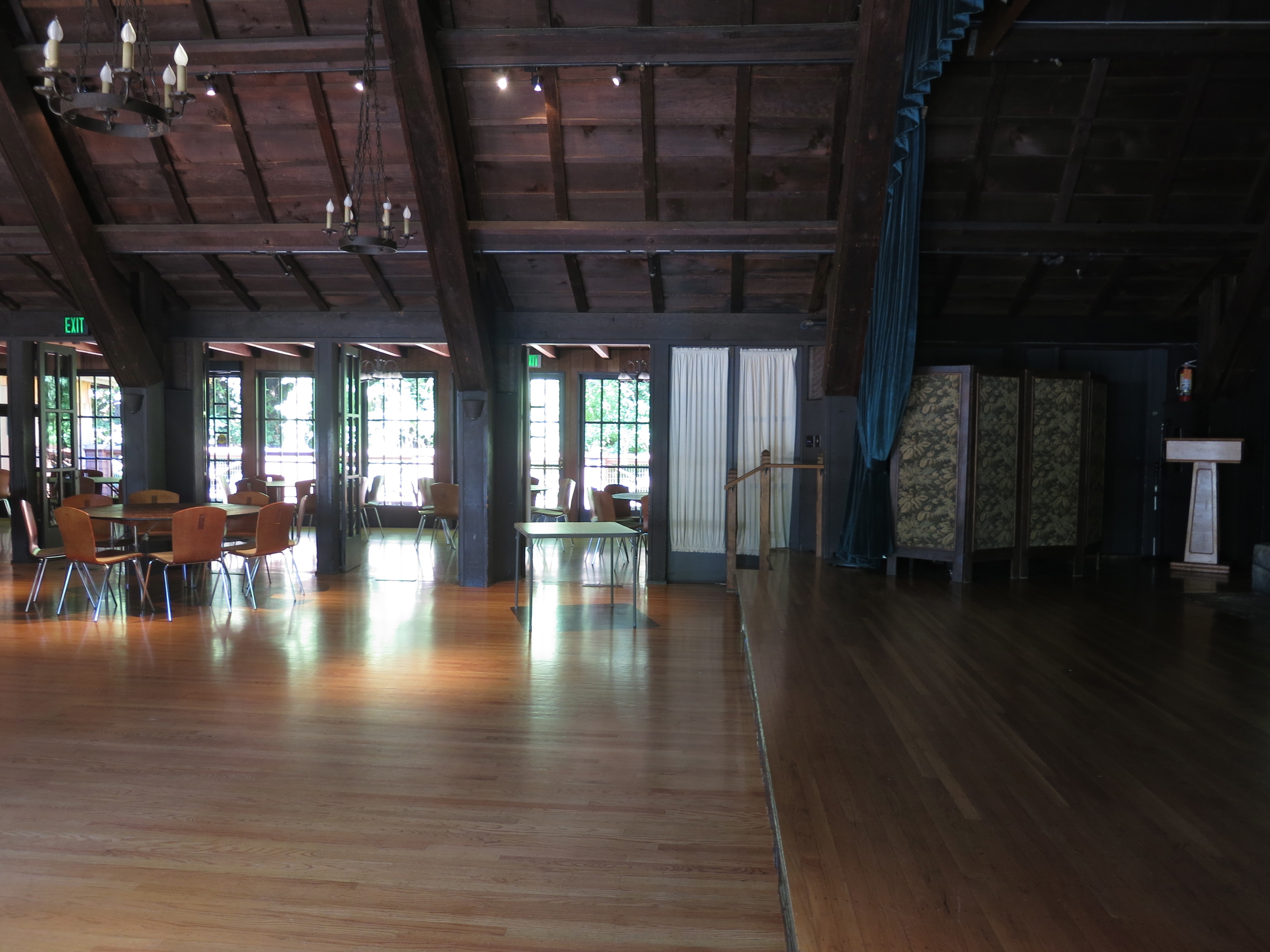

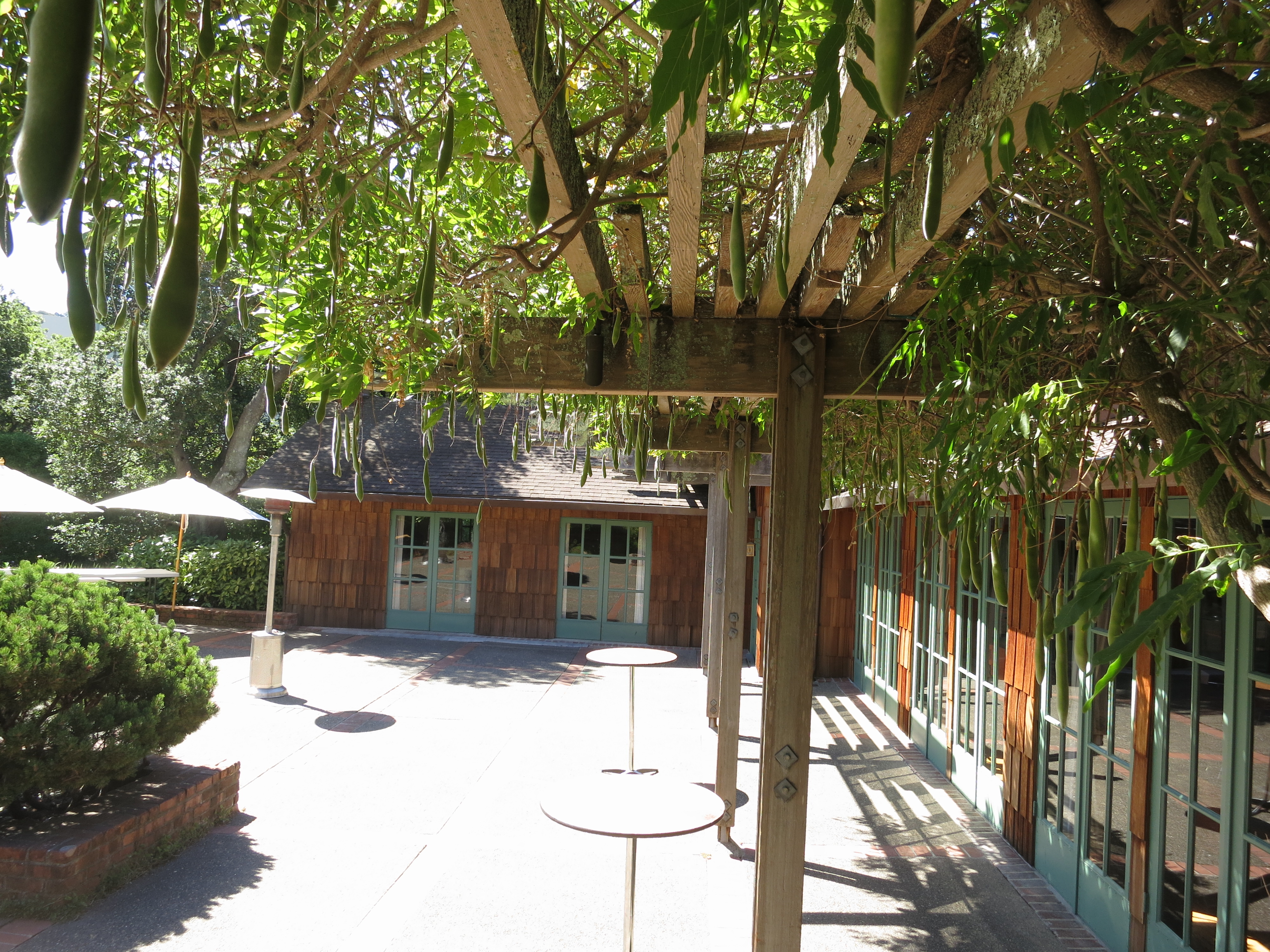

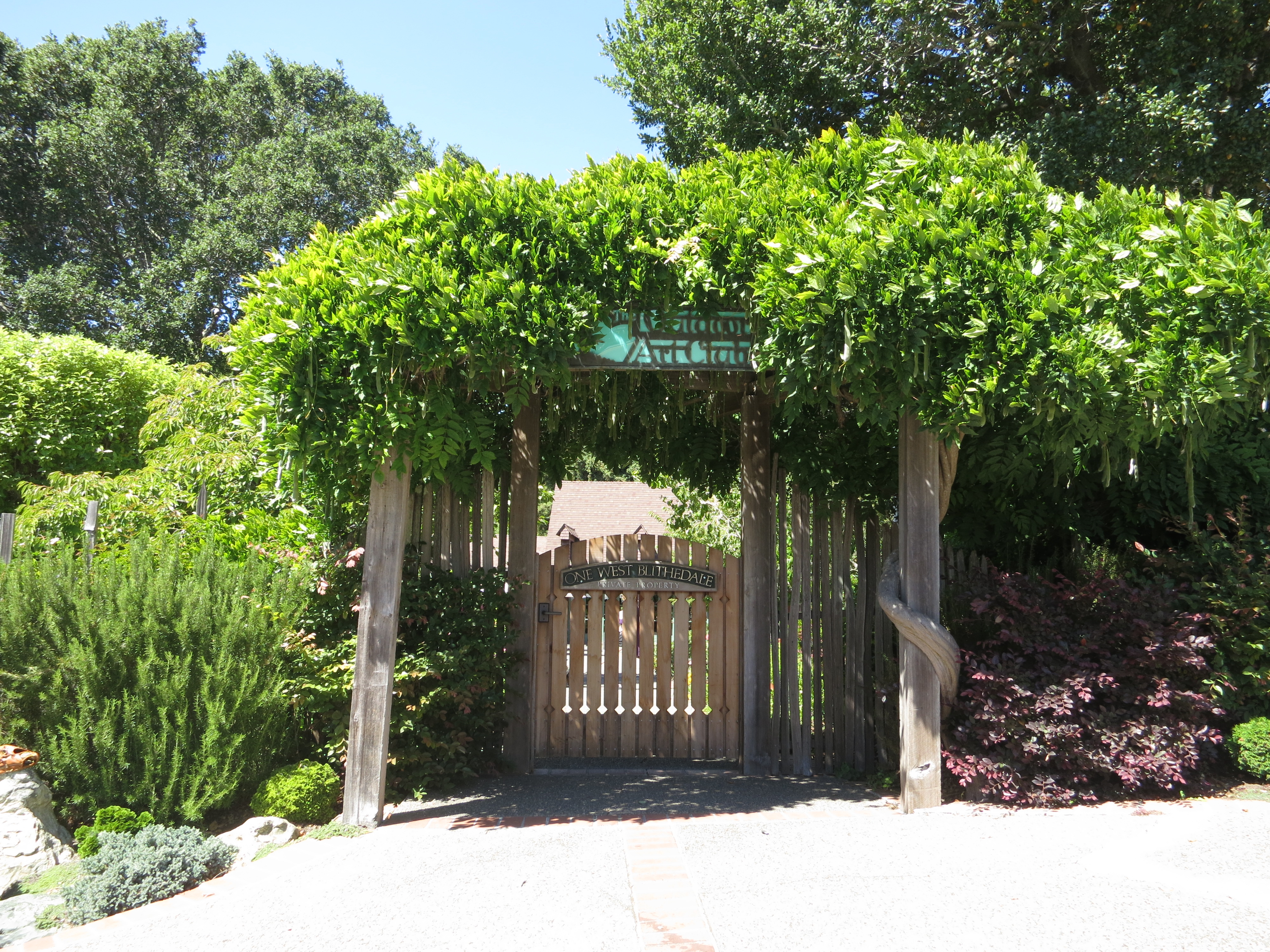

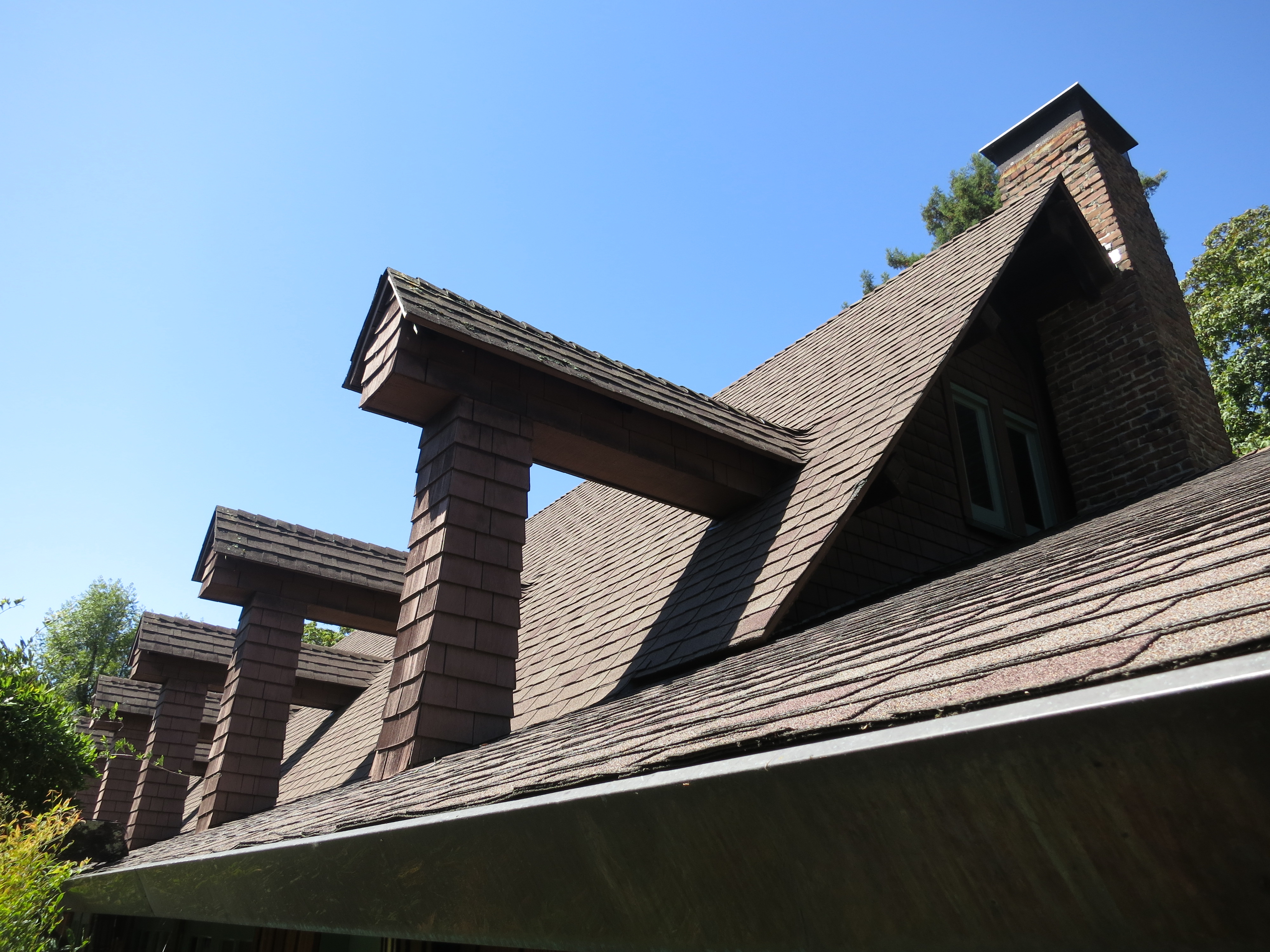

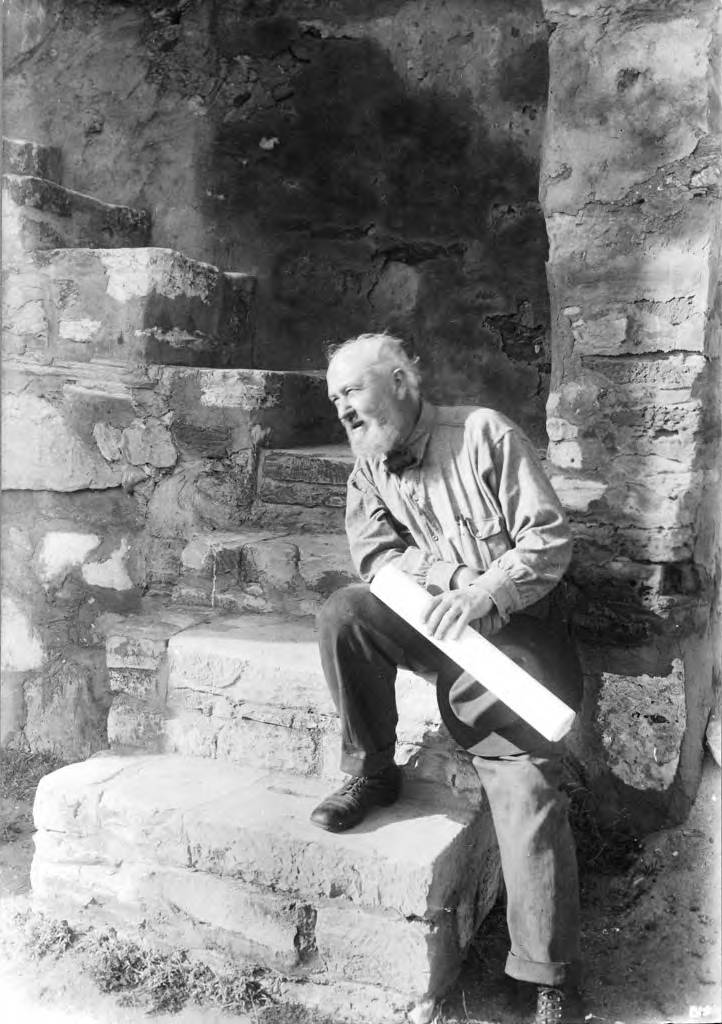
Bernard Maybeck in 1919

== See also ==
- California Historical Landmarks in Marin County
