= Brock's Boathouse =

Historic building in California, United States

- Brock Schreiber Boathouse and Beach
- U.S. National Register of Historic Places
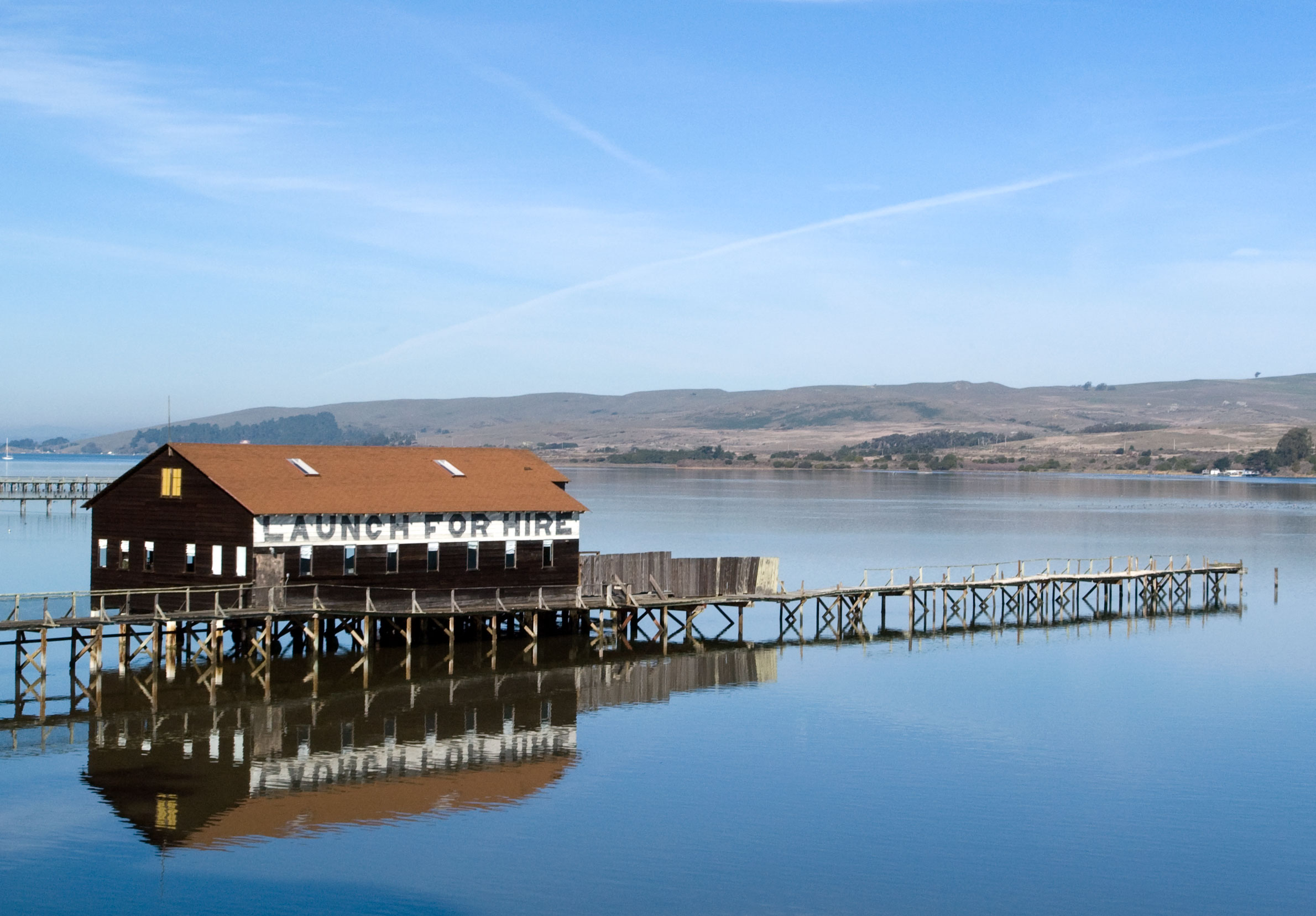

- Location within California Location within the United States
- Location: 12830 Sir Francis Drake Blvd., Inverness, California, US
- Coordinates: 38°06′07″N 122°51′18″W
- Area: 0.8 acres (0.32 ha)
- Built: 1913
- Built by: Brock Schreiber
- NRHP reference No.: 78000702
- Added to NRHP: July 7, 1978

The Brock Schreiber Boathouse (also known as Brock's Boathouse) is a historical structure on Tomales Bay in Inverness, California, United States. It consists of a 34-by-60-foot (10 by 18 m) boathouse with a wharf measuring 300 feet (91 m). The building was completed in 1914 by a bachelor named Brock Schreiber who lived nearby. It was added to the National Register of Historic Places in 1978.

== Description ==
Brock's Boathouse is located in Inverness, California, United States, on Tomales Bay, an inlet of the Pacific Ocean. It has a formal address of 12830 Sir Francis Drake Boulevard. The main building is a rectangular, 34-by-60-foot (10 by 18 m) structure with a redwood facade made of 1-by-8-foot (0.30 by 2.44 m) horizontal beams. It is topped by a shingled gable roof.

The foundation, rebuilt in the 1970s, consists of reinforced concrete columns connected by a continuous beam. The interior is finished with softwood flooring measuring 4 by 10 feet (1.2 by 3.0 m) across, spanning across the concrete columns. The floor beams are supported by joists measuring 2 by 12 feet (0.61 by 3.66 m) across. The interior of has electricity and running water, shelves, and a 40-foot (12 m) workbench. The building's southwest corner was once an engine station.

== History ==
A wharf measuring about 300 feet (91 m) long was constructed in 1908. Brock's Boathouse itself was built starting in 1913. Its builder, a bachelor named Brock Schreiber who lived nearby, completed the boathouse the next year. For about three decades, the boathouse was a boat launch and social gathering place for Inverness residents. Children used the beach next to the wharf, and Schreiber operated the boat named Kemah, which for a fee shuttled tourists to nearby beaches. Schreiber worked on the boathouse throughout his life. Business faltered during the Great Depression, and Schreiber leased out the boathouse in 1932.

Schreiber died in 1964. In 1967, the Inverness Association began raising $20,000 to preserve the boathouse, following a yearlong legal dispute over Schreiber's estate. The association purchased the boathouse that year, then spent $4,000 on structural stabilization. Plans to convert the boathouse into a fishing pier failed, and the association attempted to find some alternate use of the boathouse for the next 11 years.

The building and adjacent beach were placed on the National Register of Historic Places in 1978. The association tried to sell the boathouse the next year, while retaining the beach, but dropped these plans since it would have required dividing ownership of the land. The boathouse and beach were jointly placed on sale in 1980, with restrictions that prohibited parking, animals, signs, temporary structures, towers or antennas, and drilling. The house was sold to Ed and Nancy Richardson in 1981, subject to those deed restrictions, for an offer of $30,000. In 2014, the Inverness Association lifted a longstanding deed restriction that had banned residential usage of the boathouse.

== See also ==
- National Register of Historic Places listings in Marin County, California
