= Olema Lime Kilns =

- U.S. National Register of Historic Places
- California Historical Landmark
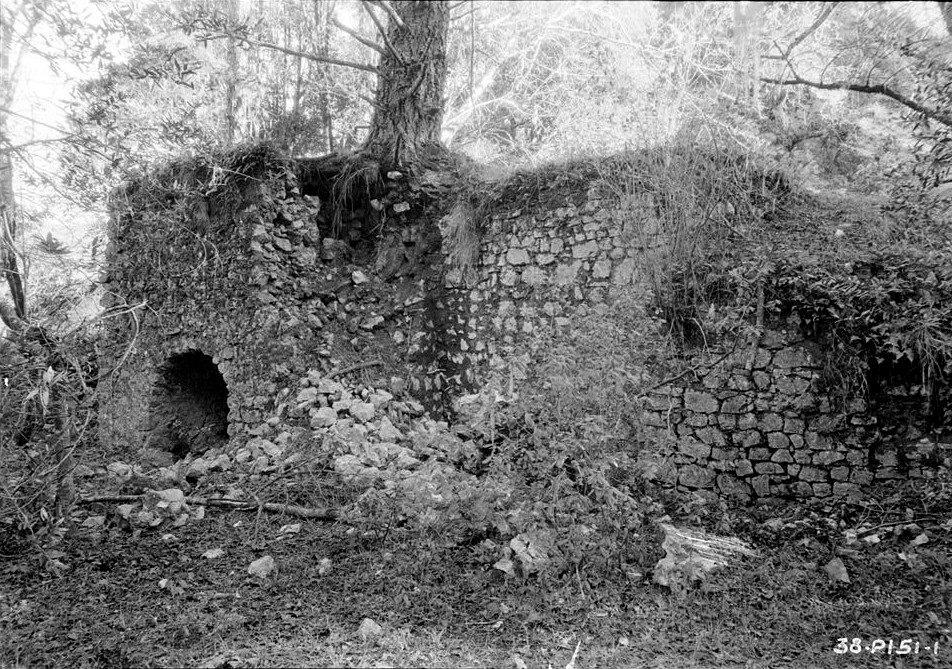

- Location within California Location within the United States
- Nearest city: Olema, California
- Coordinates: 37°59′18″N 122°44′46″W
- Built: 1850
- Architect: James A. Shore, William Mercer
- NRHP reference No.: 76000217
- CHISL No.: 222
- Added to NRHP: October 08, 1976

The Olema Lime Kilns at Point Reyes National Seashore in California were built in 1850 on land leased from Mexican grantee Rafael Garcia by James A. Shorb and William F. Mercer, two San Francisco entrepreneurs. The kilns were reportedly fired only a few times, and have lain abandoned for some 140 years. They were apparently abandoned no later than 1855 after only a few firings, probably due to the poor quality, small limestone deposits and the financial depression of that year. They represent a Gold Rush era effort to establish a lime-producing industry in Marin County, only two years after cession of Alta California to the United States by Mexico. They consist of three long-abandoned, barrel-shaped stone vaults lying in ruins against a hillside on the east side of Olema Creek about five miles south of Olema and about 100 yards west of California State Highway 1.

== Kiln No. 1 ==
The kiln on the south was built of gray limestone which on the interior of the barrel was cut and fitted to enable application of a smooth coating of fireclay and, running halfway around the back, firebrick. Use of firebrick as a lining at the back suggest treatment for higher temperature there. The outer casing, rectangular in shape, was also built of cut limestone. Between the inner and out casings is afilling composed of irregular chunks of limestone set in mud or clay mortar. When these kilns were abandoned, Kiln No. 1 was loaded with limestone but not fired, rendering measurement of its interior impossible.

== Kiln No. 2 ==
Kiln No. 2 was built adjacent to Kiln No. 1 and immediately to the north, similarly facing west towards the creek. It consisted of limestone laid in lime mortar probably produced by Kiln No. 1. It was larger, being oval in vertical section, nine feet in diameter side to side and nine feet ten inches in diameter front to rear. It was lined entirely with fireclay applied like plaster. This kiln sat farther forward than the other two, its front face extending seven feet beyond Kiln 1 and four feet beyond the front face of Kiln 3. A large Douglas fir, which according to tree ring dating sprouted after 1870, grew from the rubble between Kiln 1 and Kiln 2, severely damaging both kilns. Kiln No. 2 still has a well-preserved front arched entrance, measuring six feet from side to side at the base and two feet six inches wide at the entrance to the barrel, tapering inward.

== Kiln No. 3 ==
Kiln No. 3, to the north of Kiln No. 2, was about the same size, being an oval barrel nine feet six inches in diameter from side to side and nine feet nine inches in diameter front to rear. A large Douglas fir tree grew up from the pit of this kiln. At an undetermined date before 1940 the entire arched entrance to this kiln was removed and rebuilt in Bolinas as part of a barbecue pit. Some individual moss-covered stones were removed from that and perhaps the other kilns for such uses as rock gardens, fireplaces, walls, and the like. Such vandalism has contributed to the decay of the kilns, along with the growth of trees and bushes on them.
