= Forts Baker, Barry, and Cronkhite =

- U.S. National Register of Historic Places
- U.S. Historic district
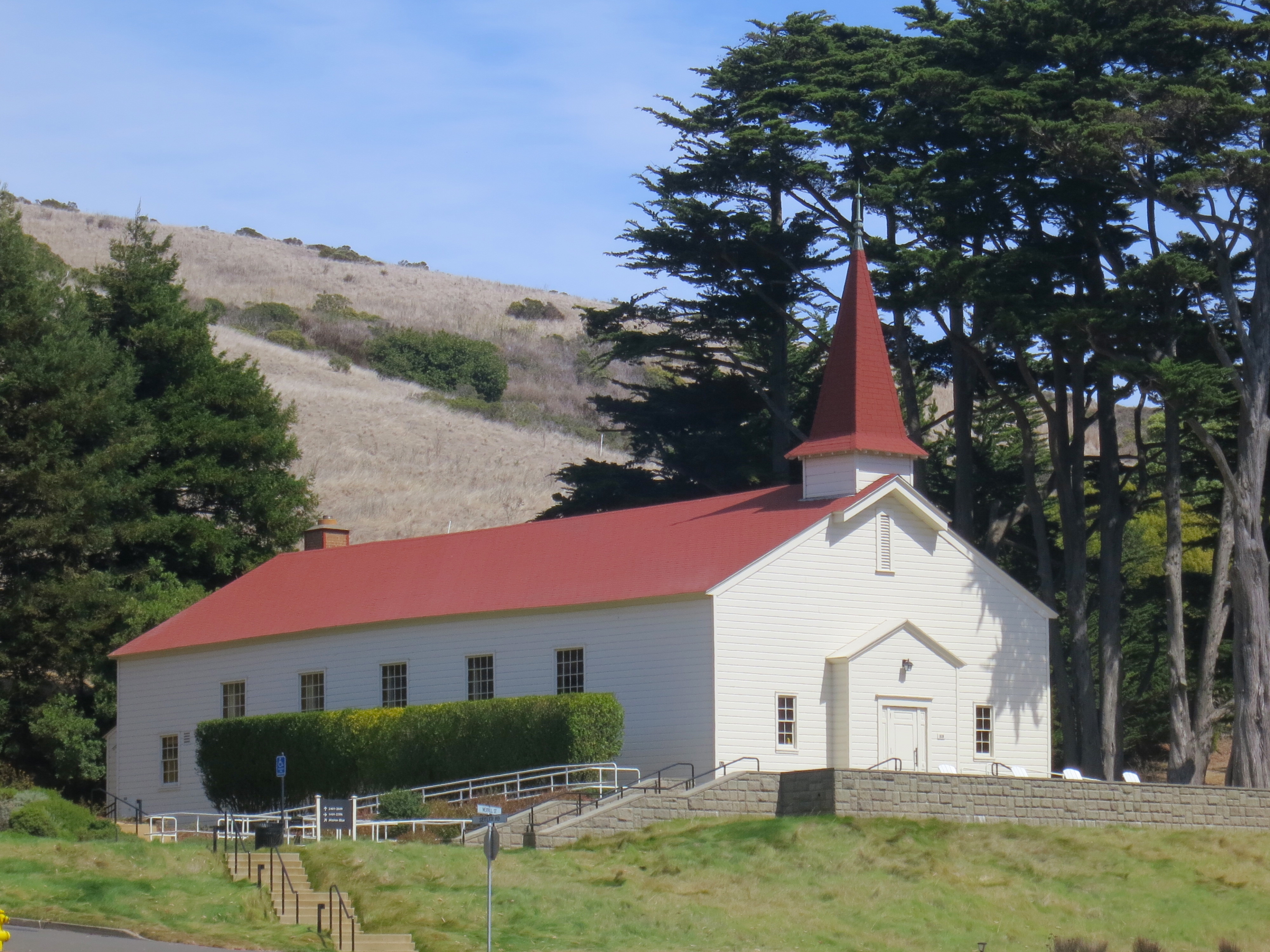

- Location within California Location within the United States
- Nearest city: Sausalito, California
- Area: 25 acres (10 ha)
- Built: 1867
- Architectural style: Stick/eastlake
- NRHP reference No.: 73000255
- Added to NRHP: December 12, 1973

Forts Baker, Barry, and Cronkhite near Sausalito, California is a combination of historic sites that, as a group, was listed on the National Register of Historic Places (NRHP) in 1973. Fort Baker is a major part. Fort Barry was constructed in 1900–1901 with 5 gun batteries, and Fort Cronkhite was built in 1914 following lengthy negotiations between the US Army and the state of California.

Forts Baker, Barry, and Cronkhite Historic District
1 Fort Baker
2 Fort Barry
3 Fort Cronkhite

It includes or is associated with the Lime Point Tract Reservation and the Tennessee Point Military Reservation. The Lime Point Tract Reservation is a historic name for Fort Baker, which became the new name in 1897.

The NRHP listing included one contributing building, 14 contributing structures and three contributing sites, with an area of 25 acres (10 ha).

Cavallo Point, now a conference center or hotel, is included.

There is at least one notable example of Stick/Eastlake architecture included.

== Gallery ==
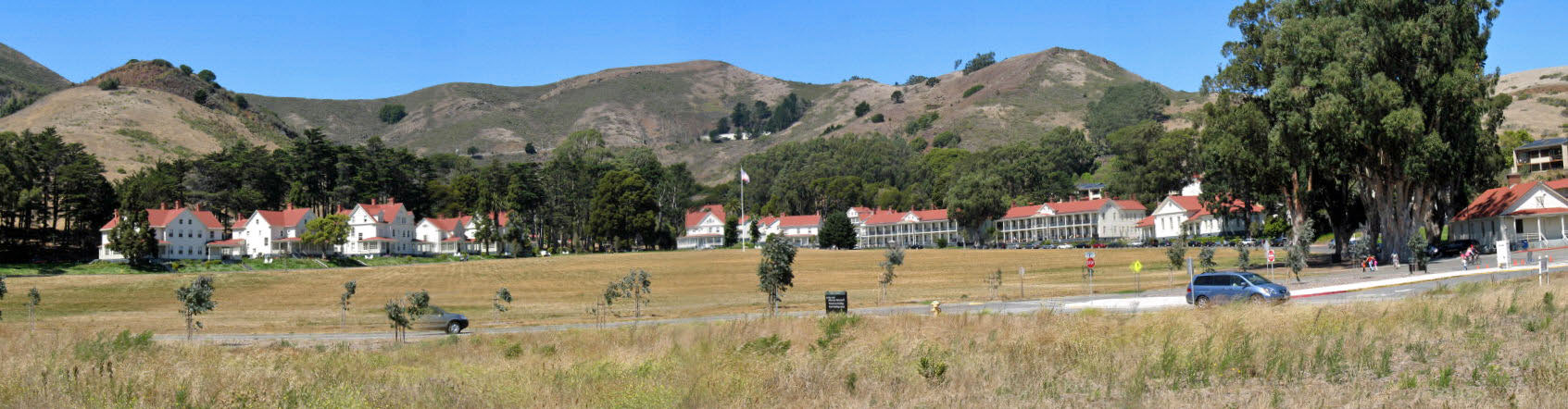
Fort Baker

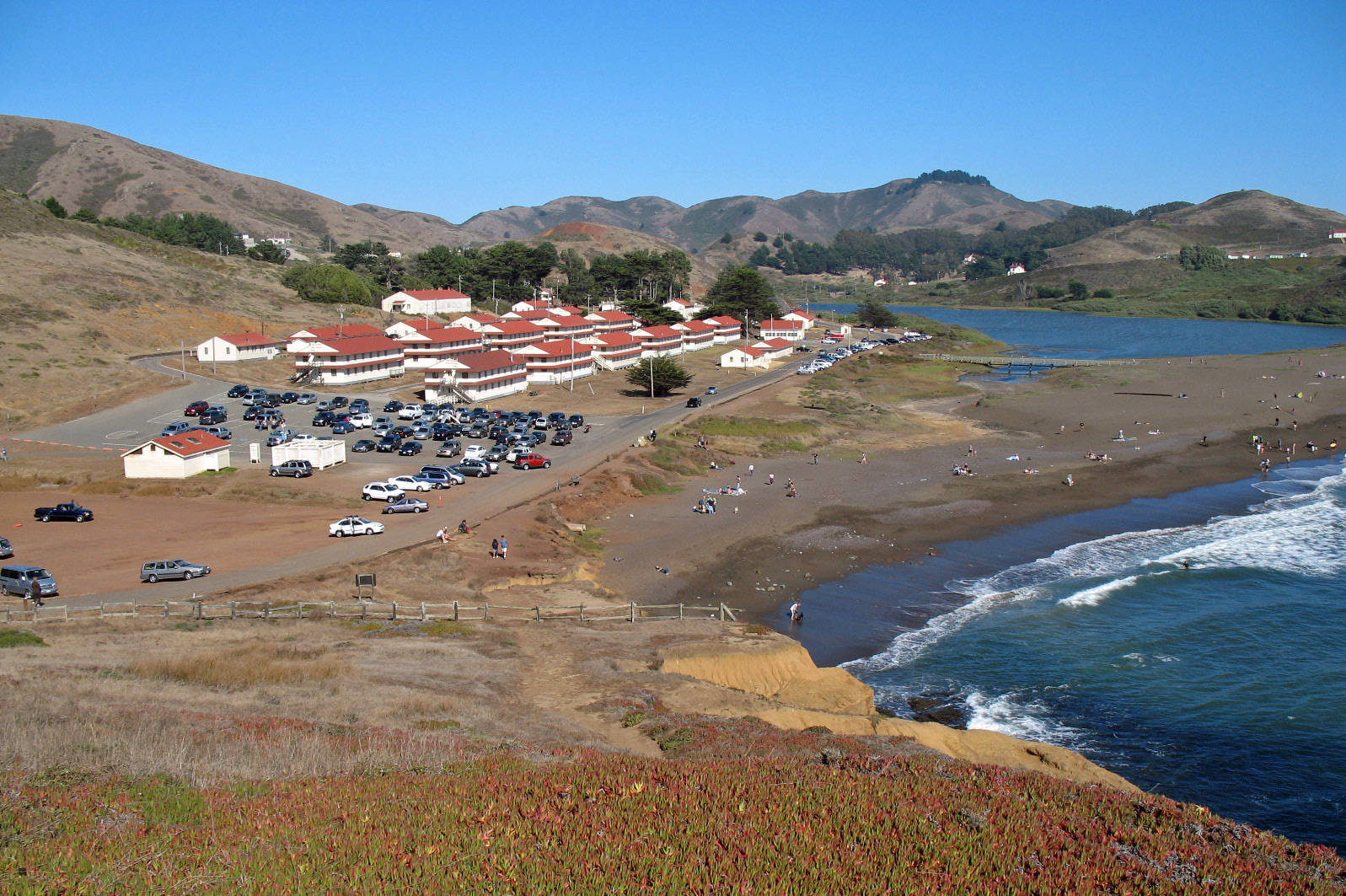
Fort Cronkhite

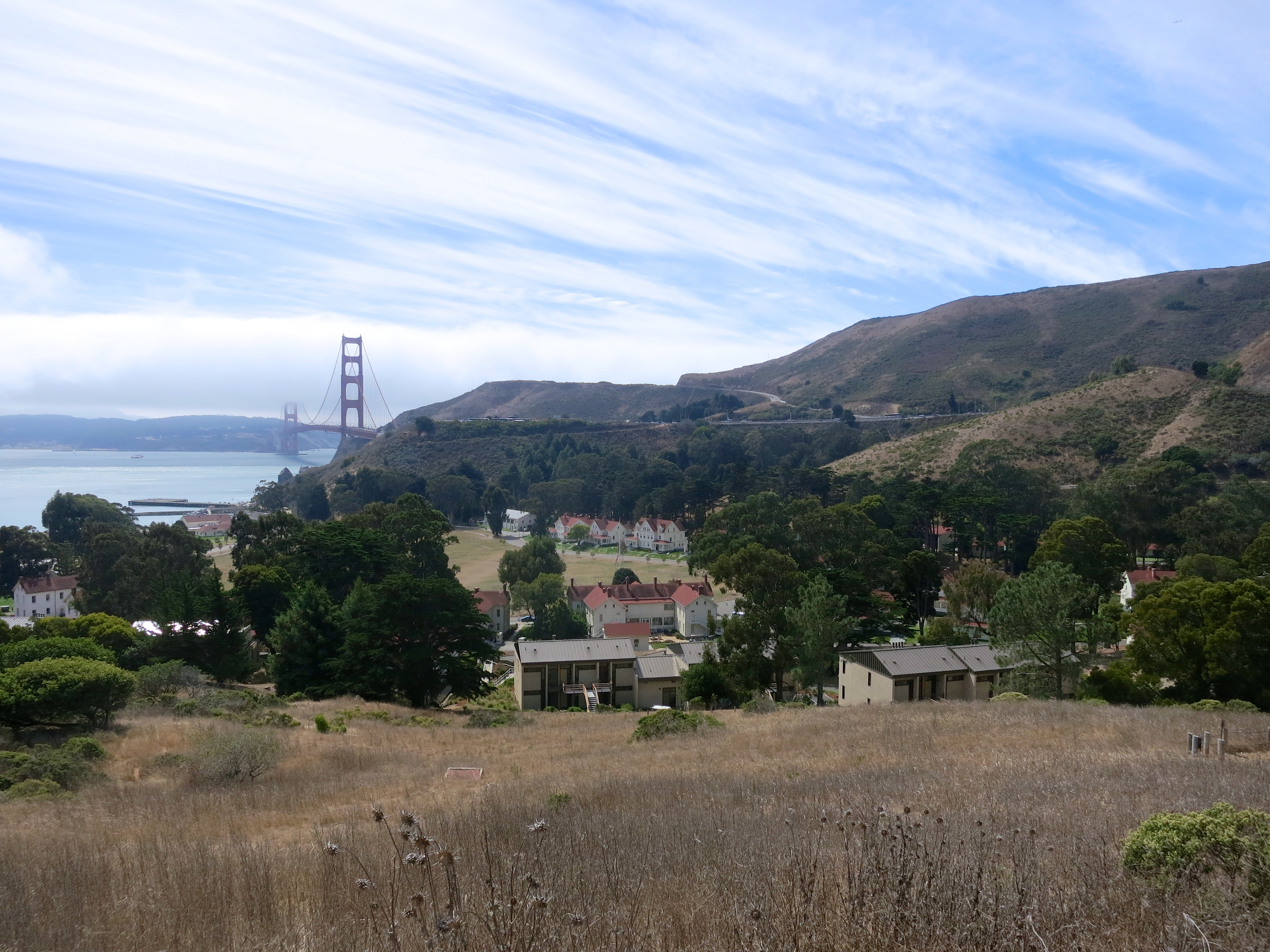

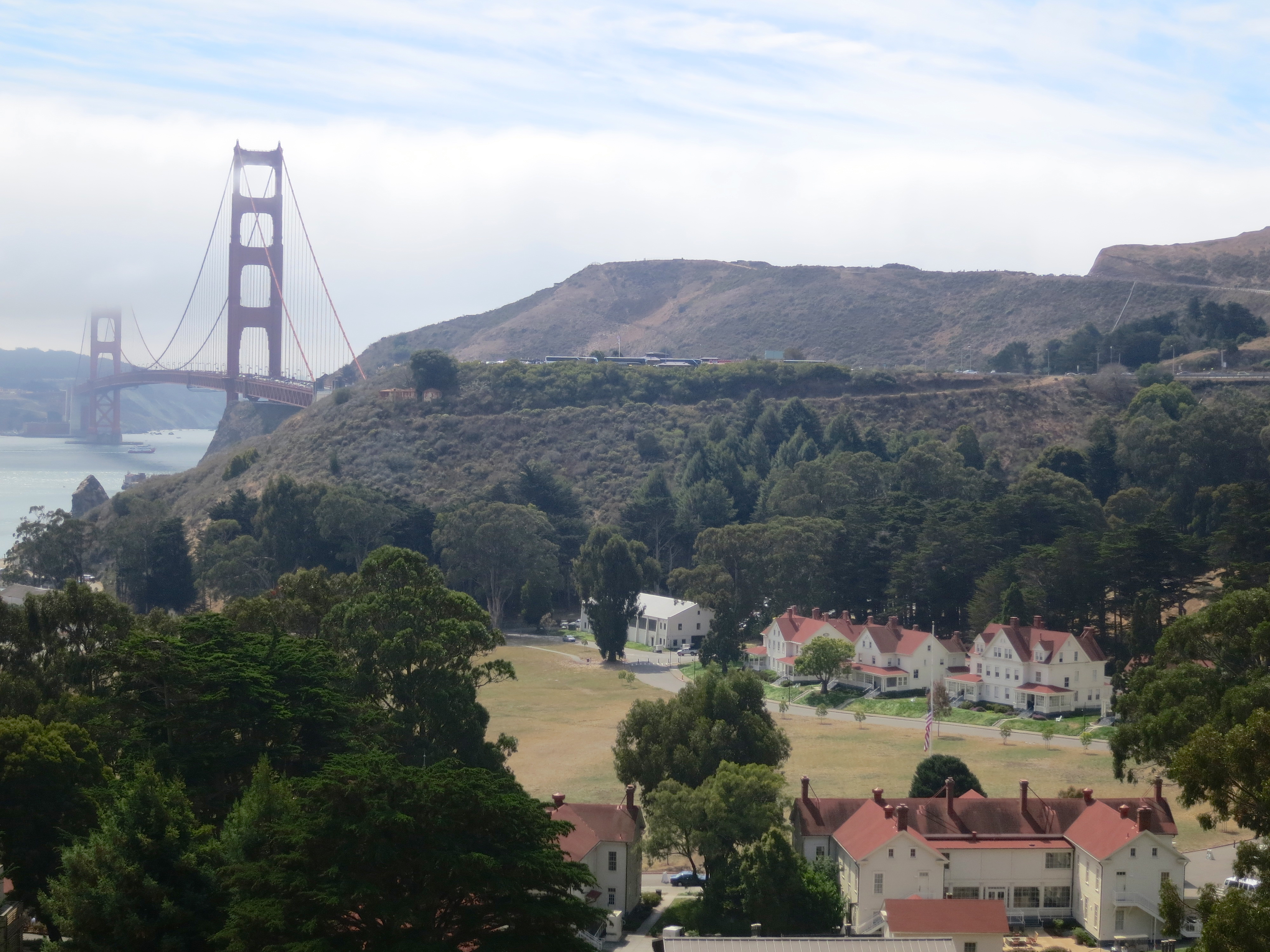

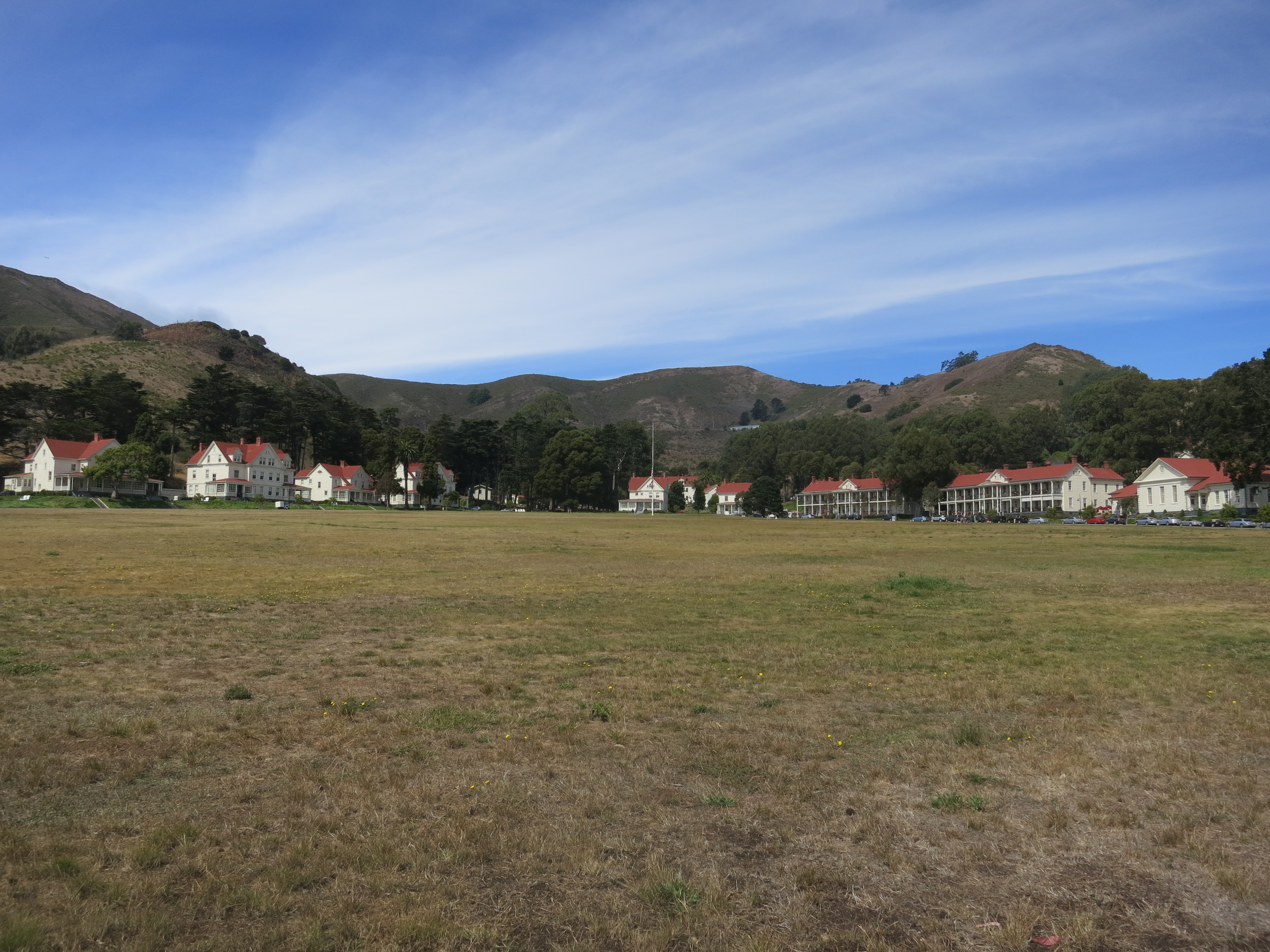

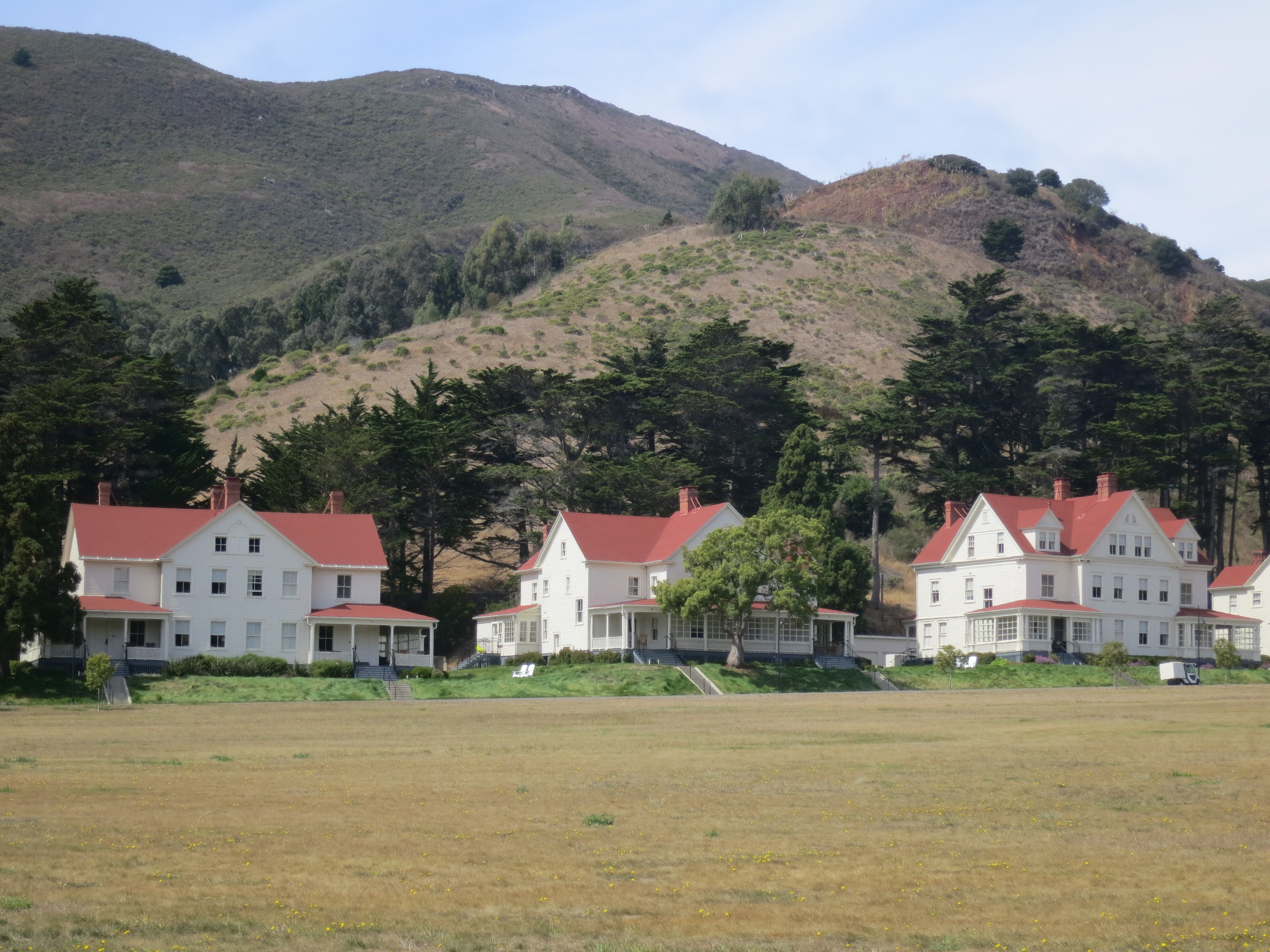

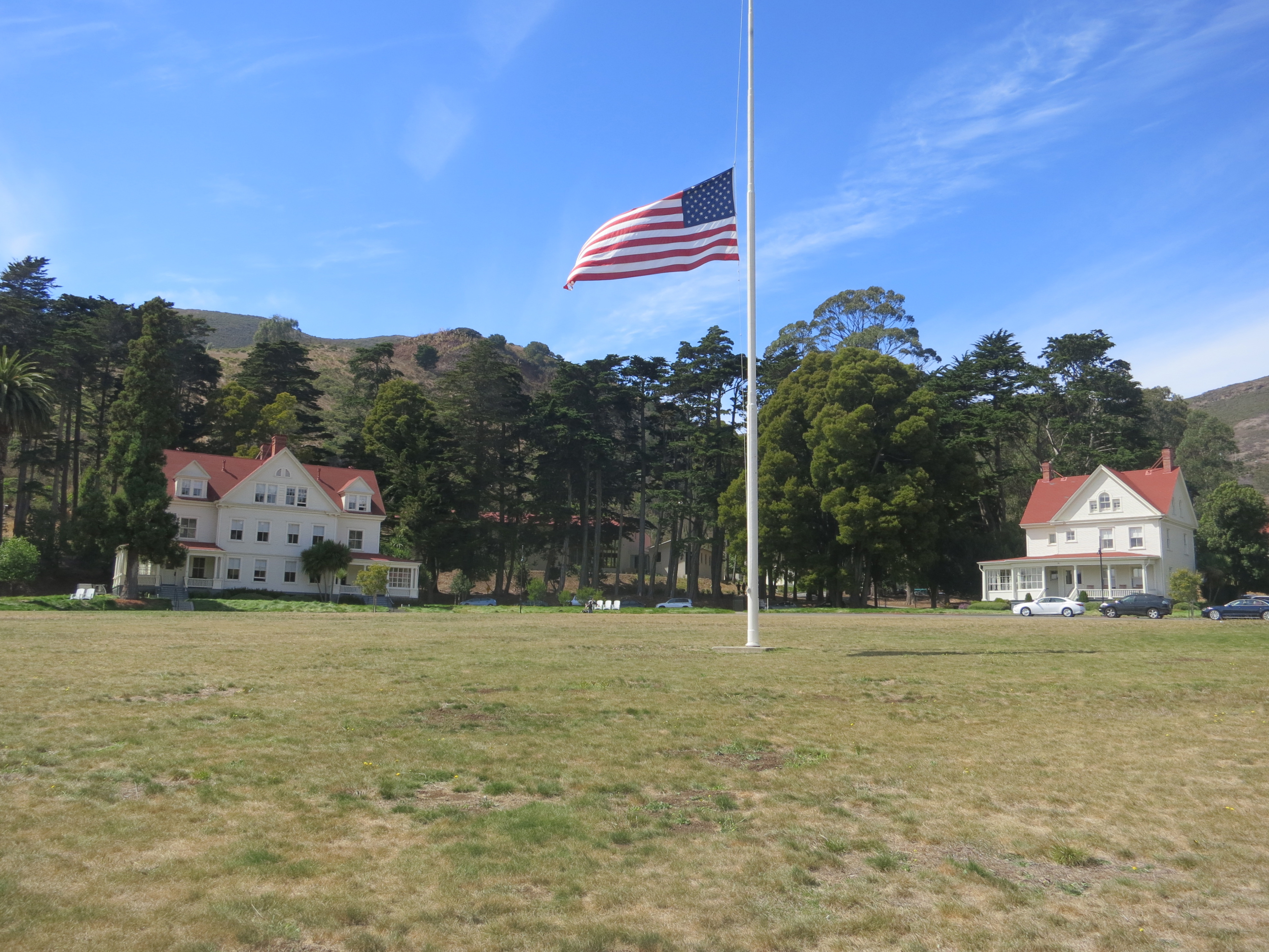

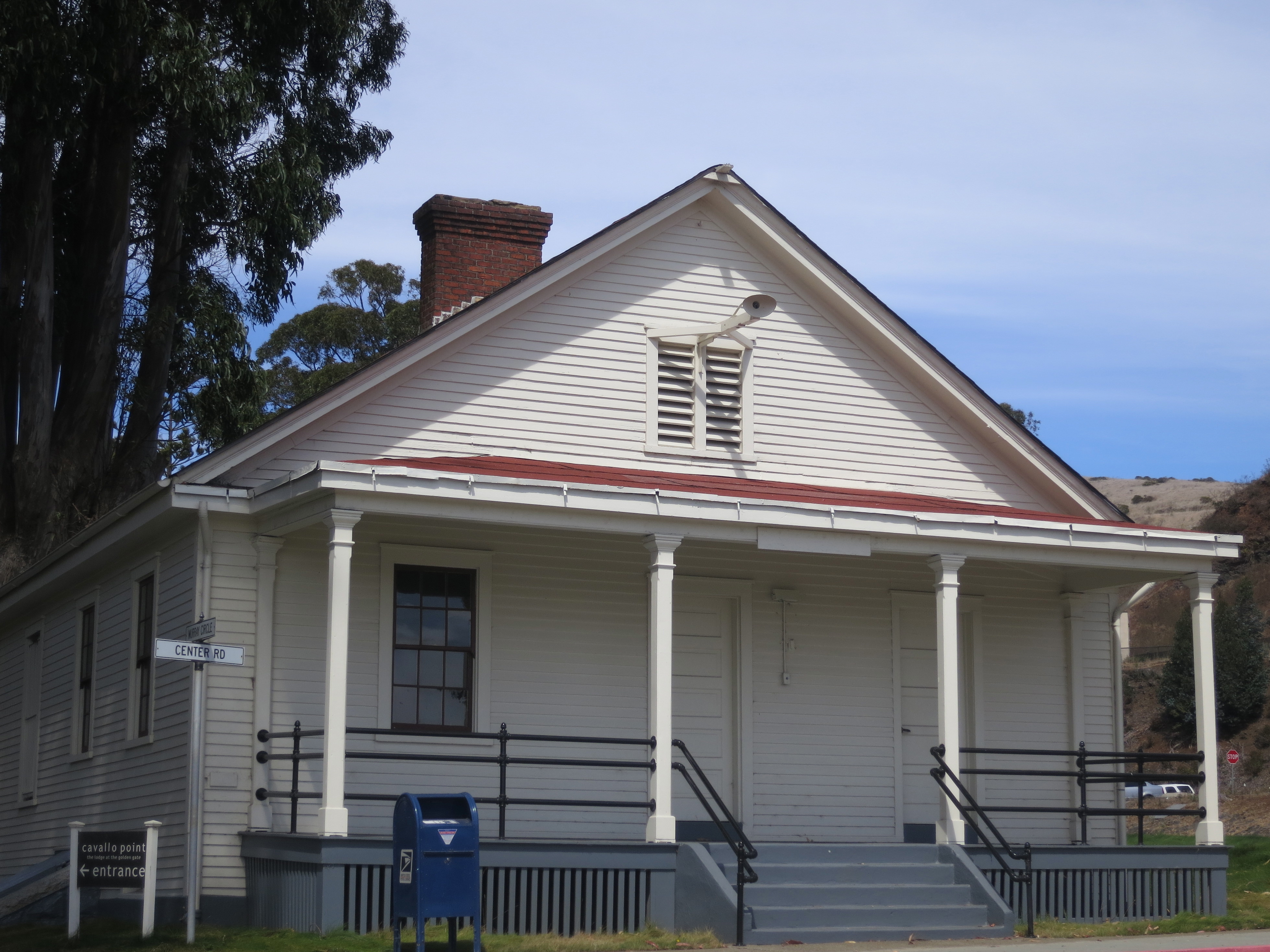

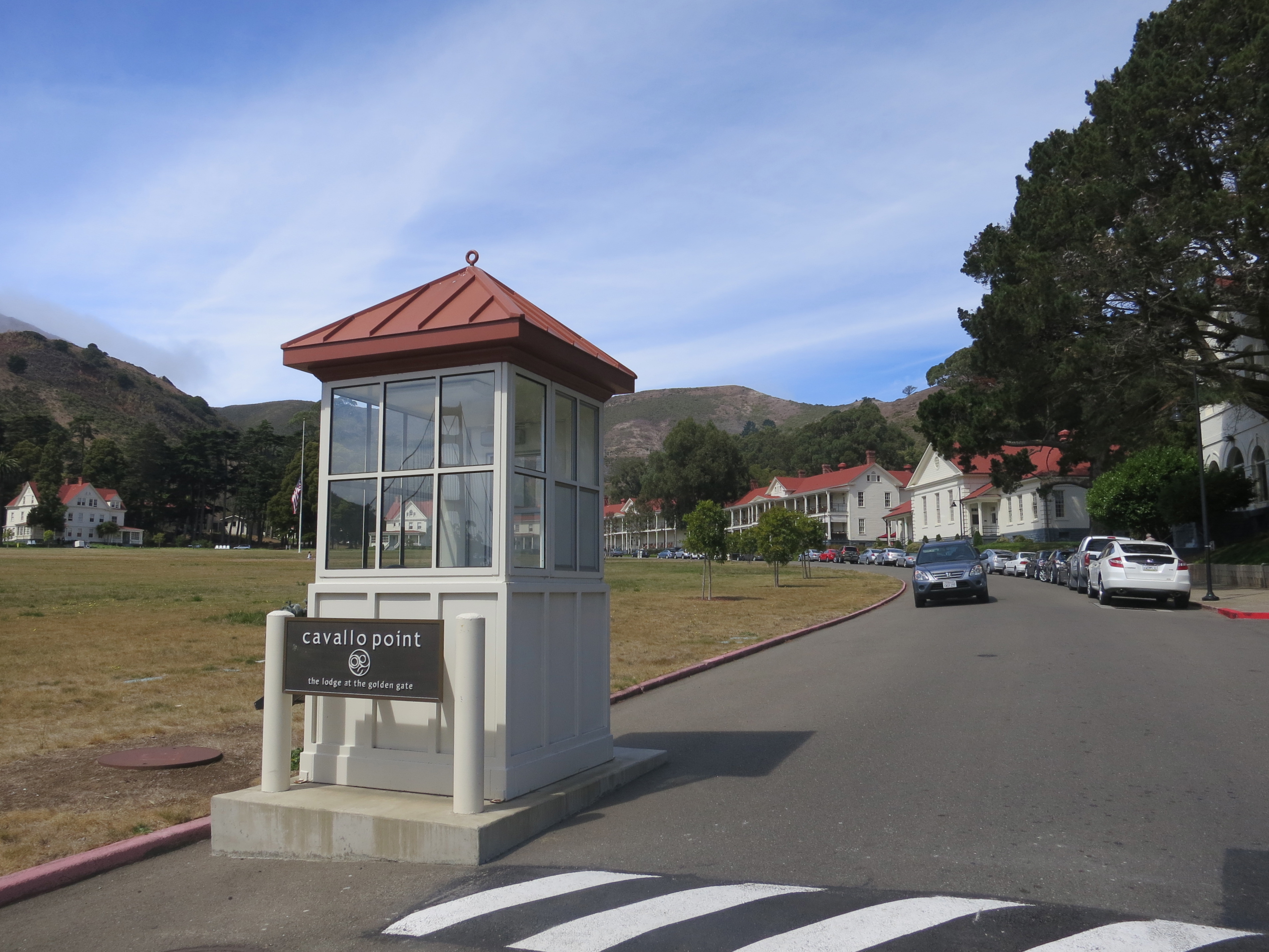

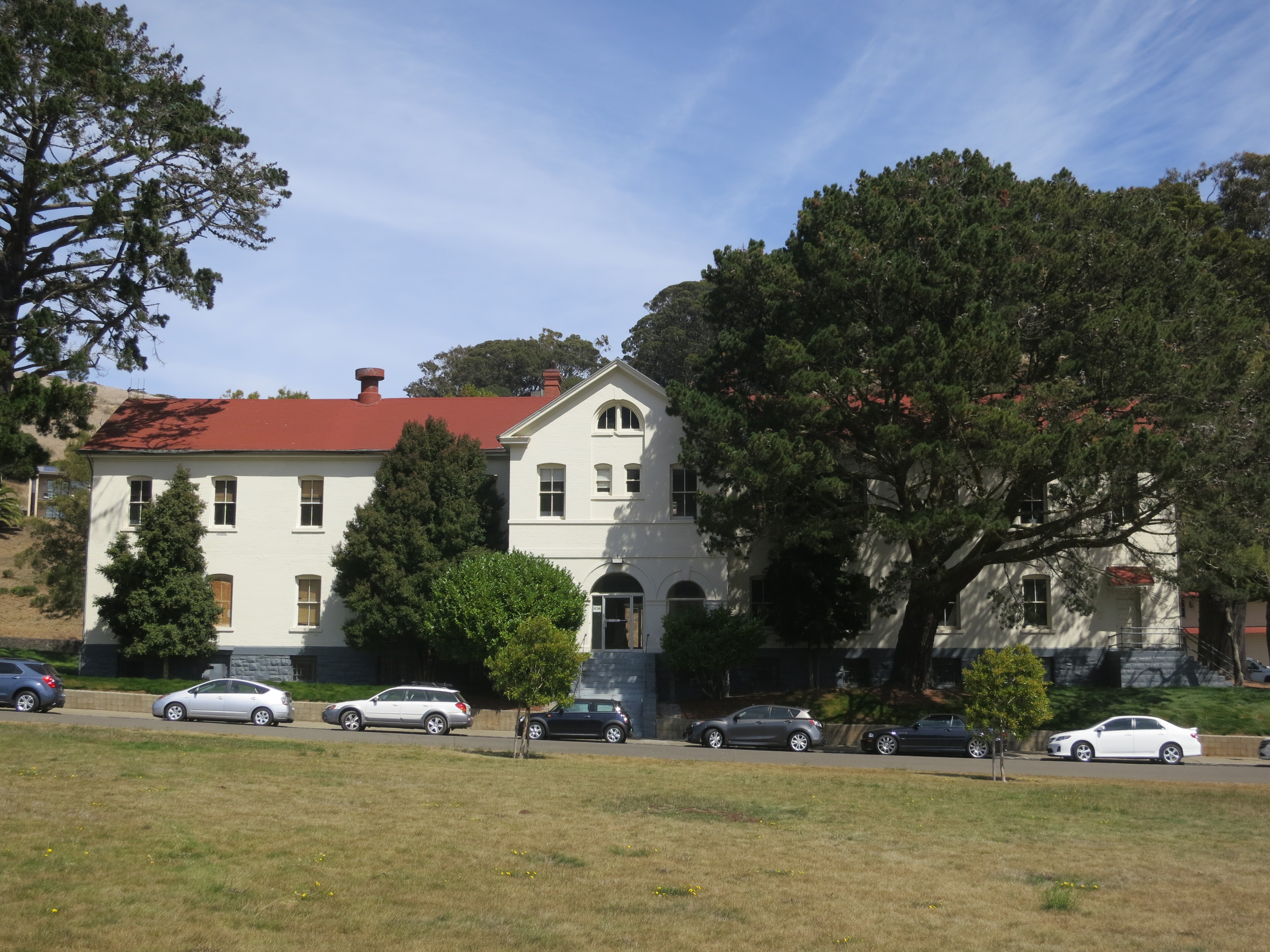

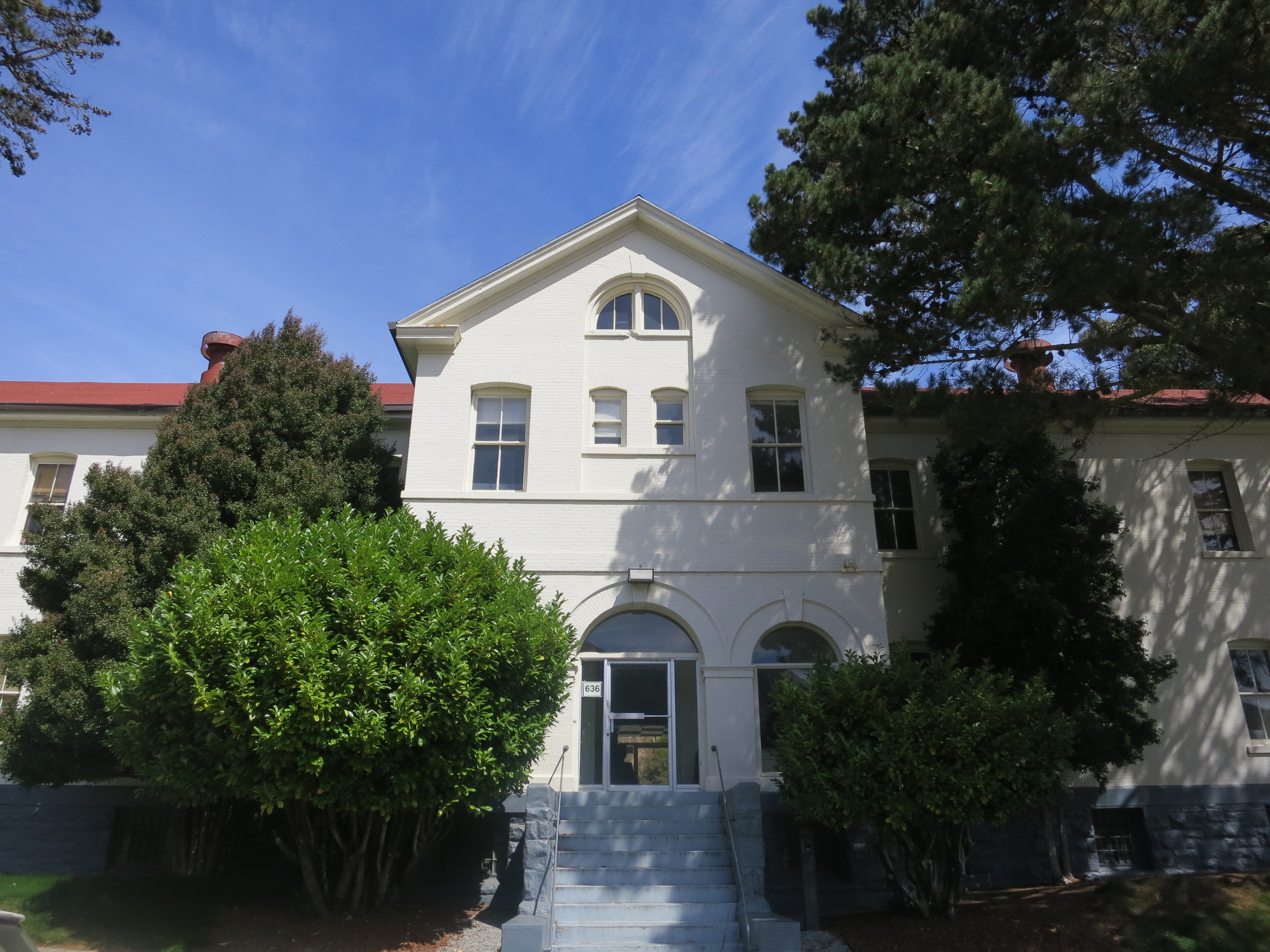

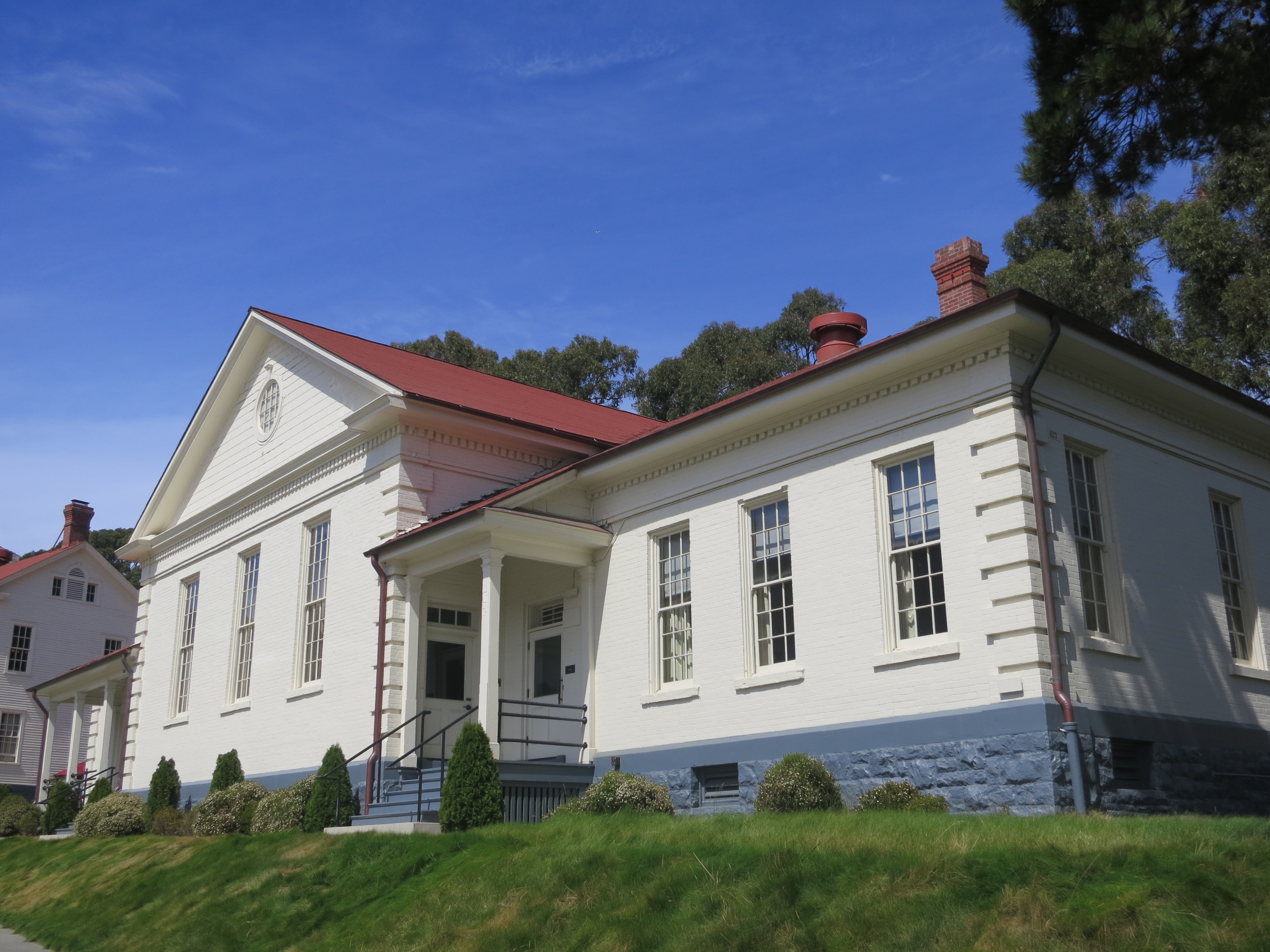

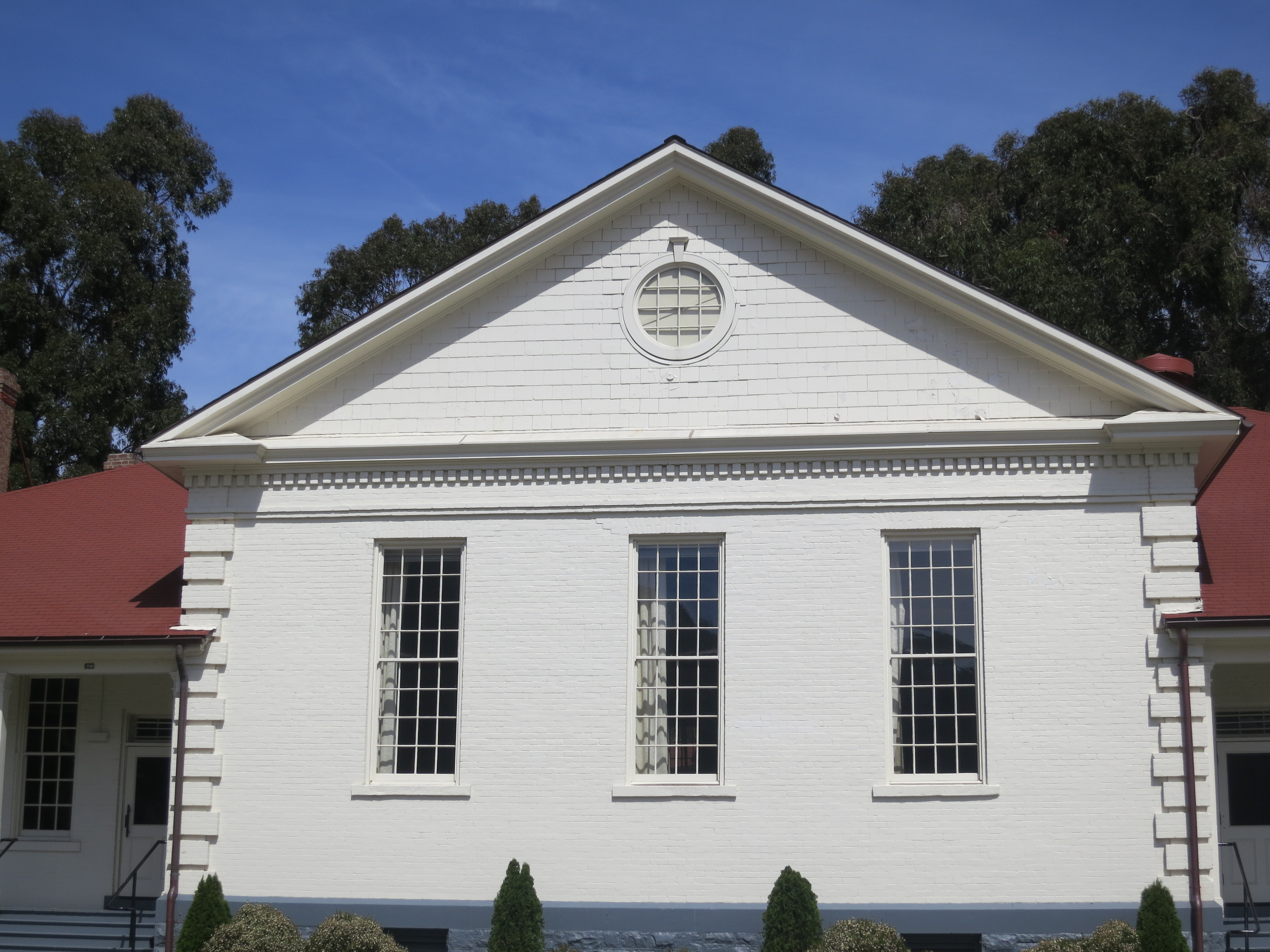

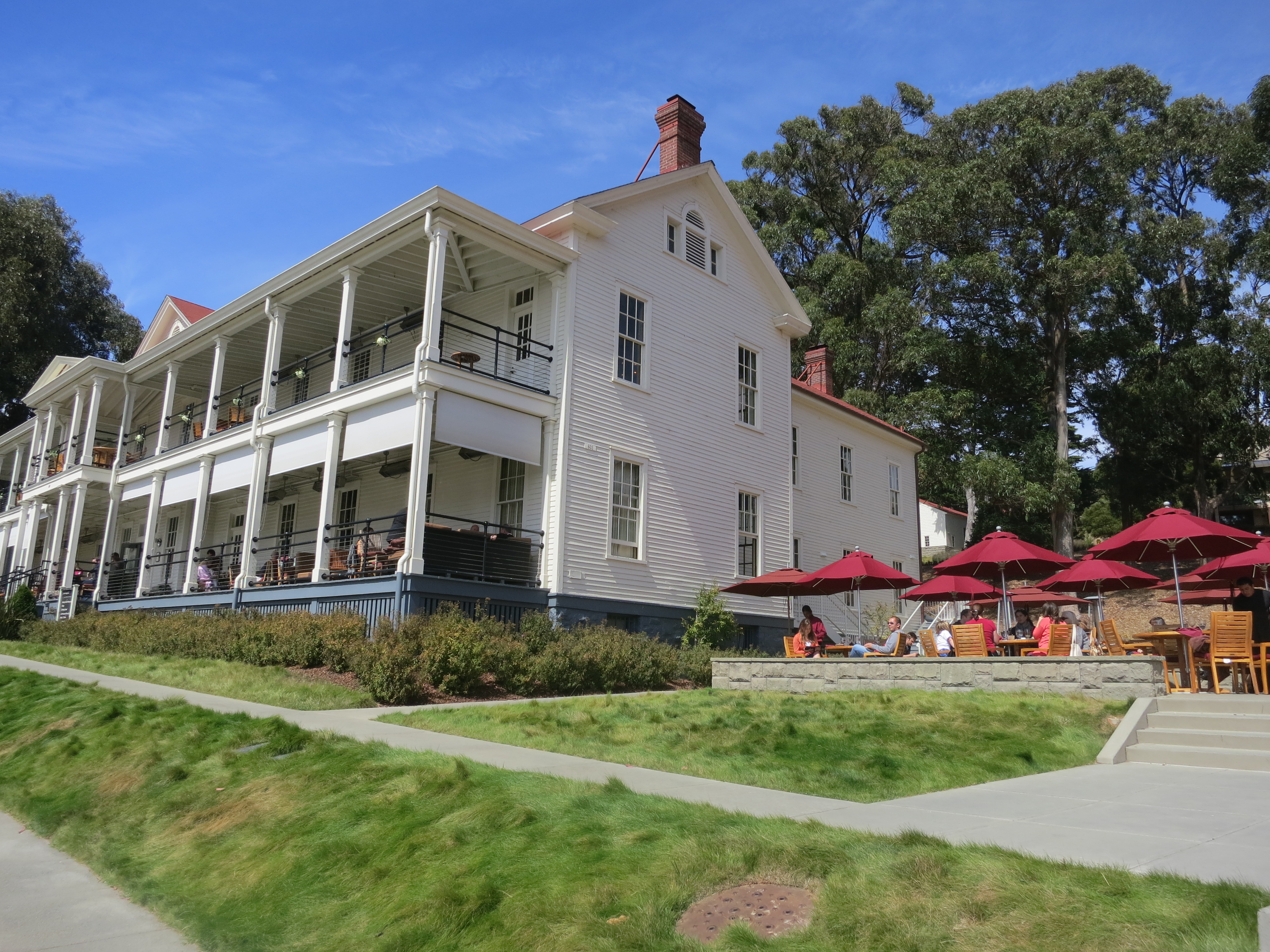

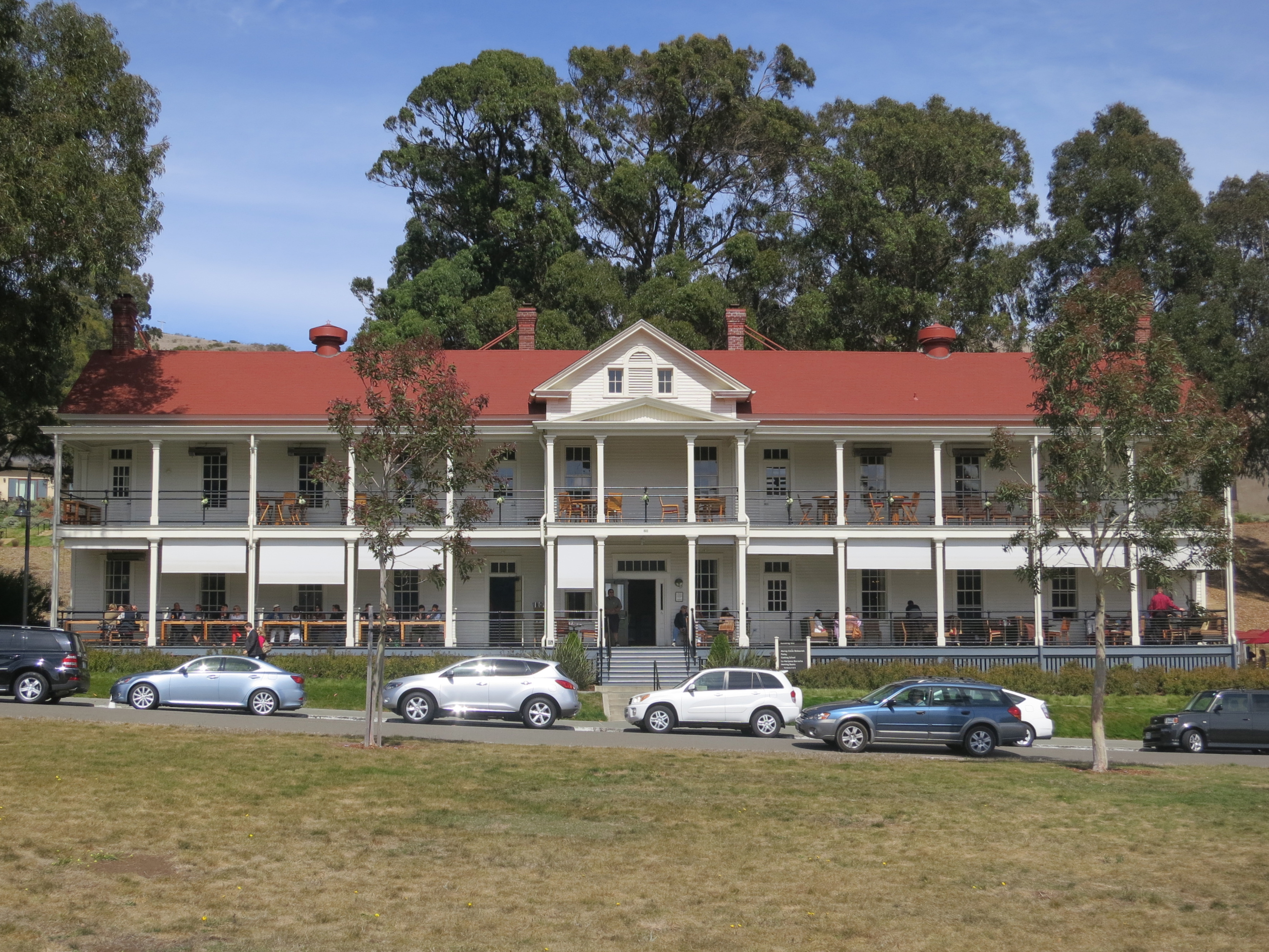

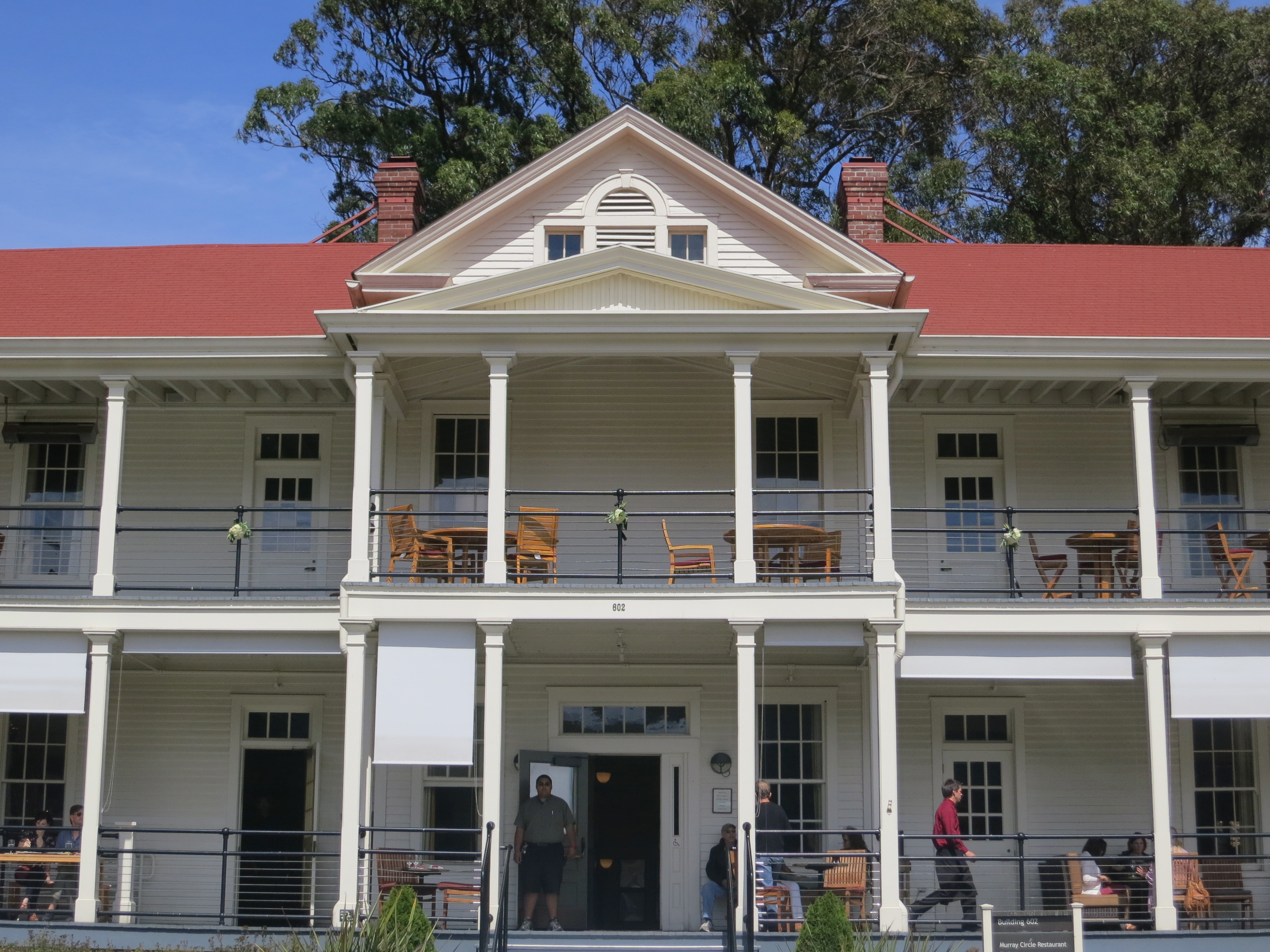

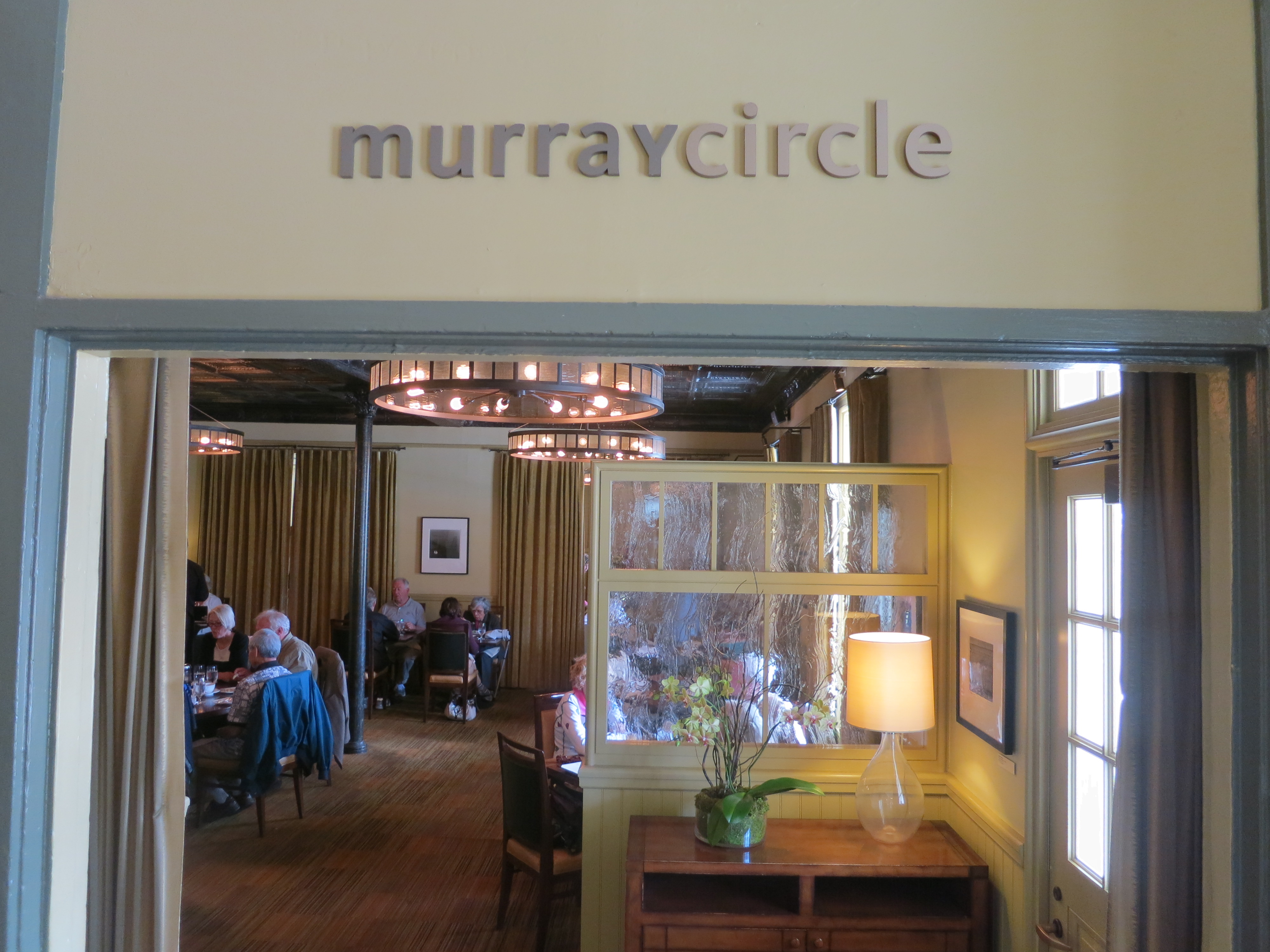

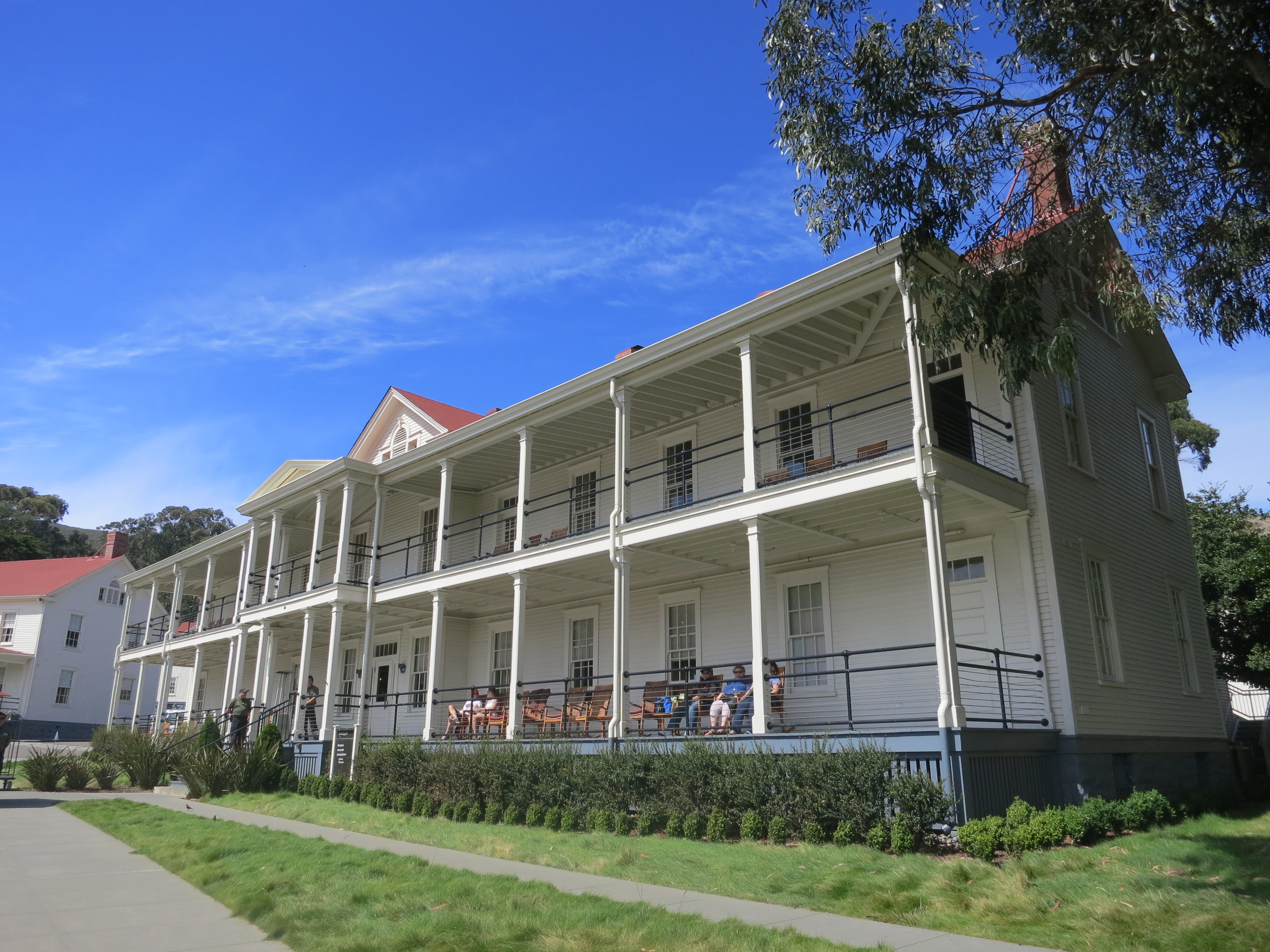

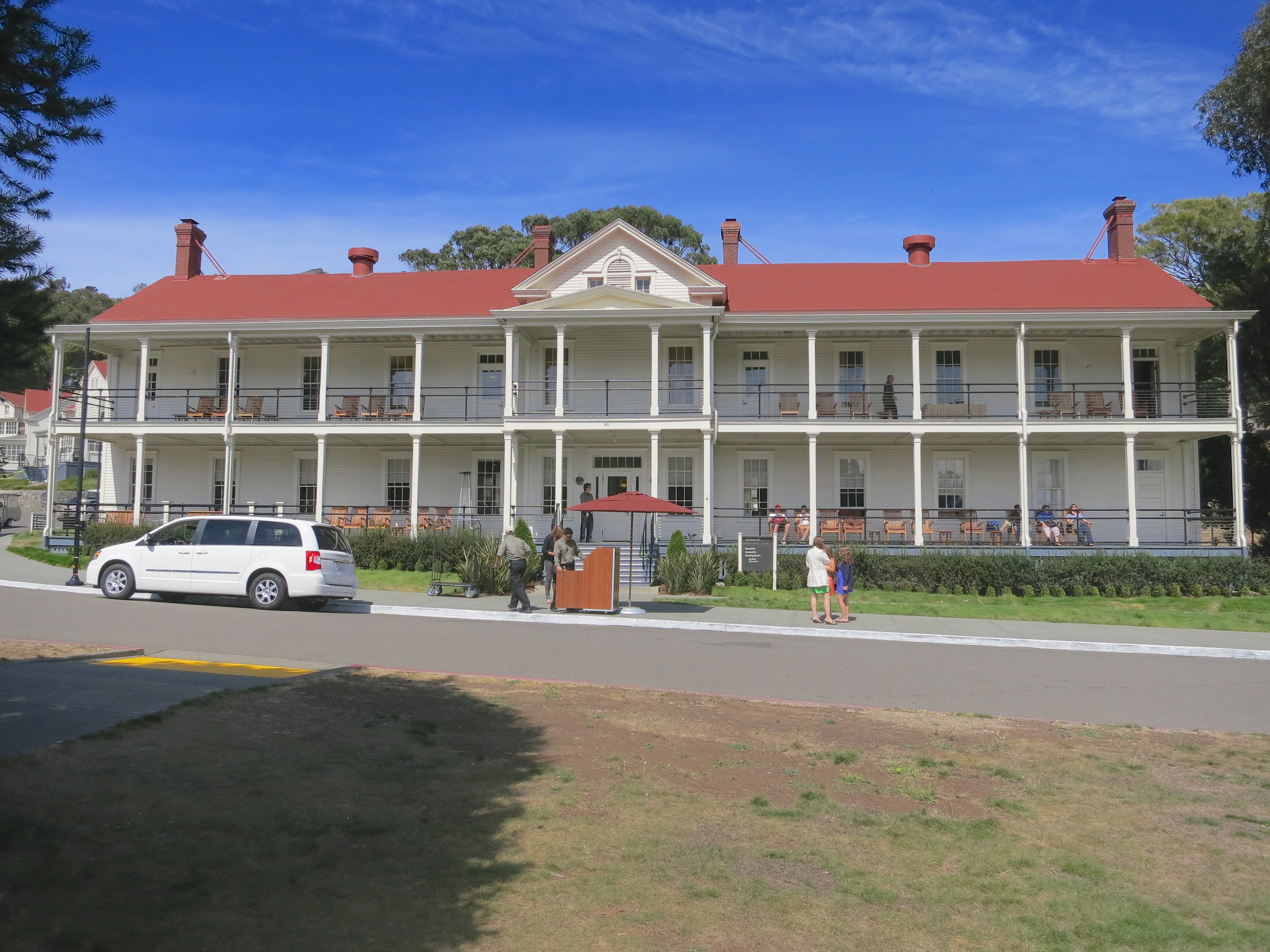

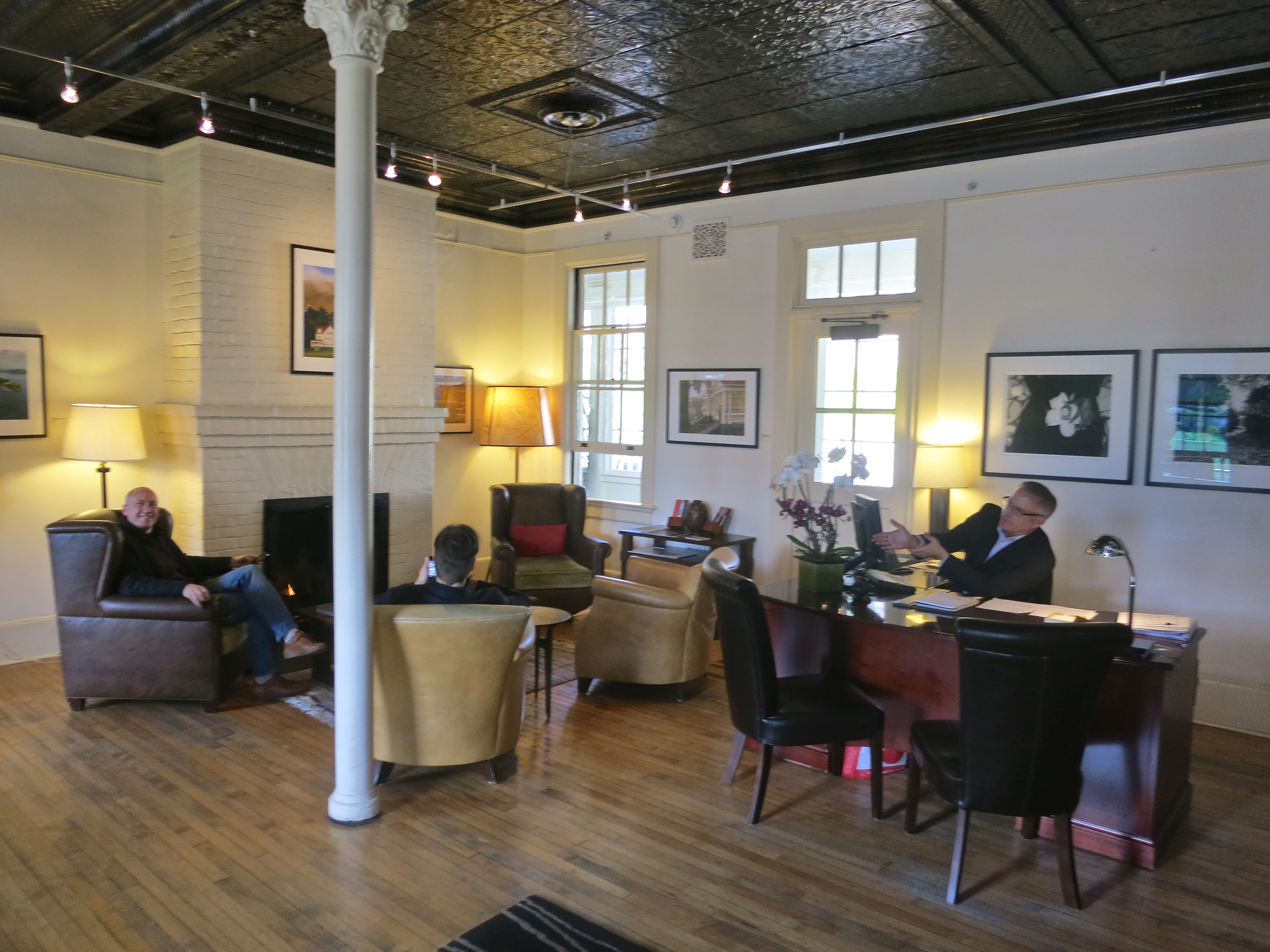

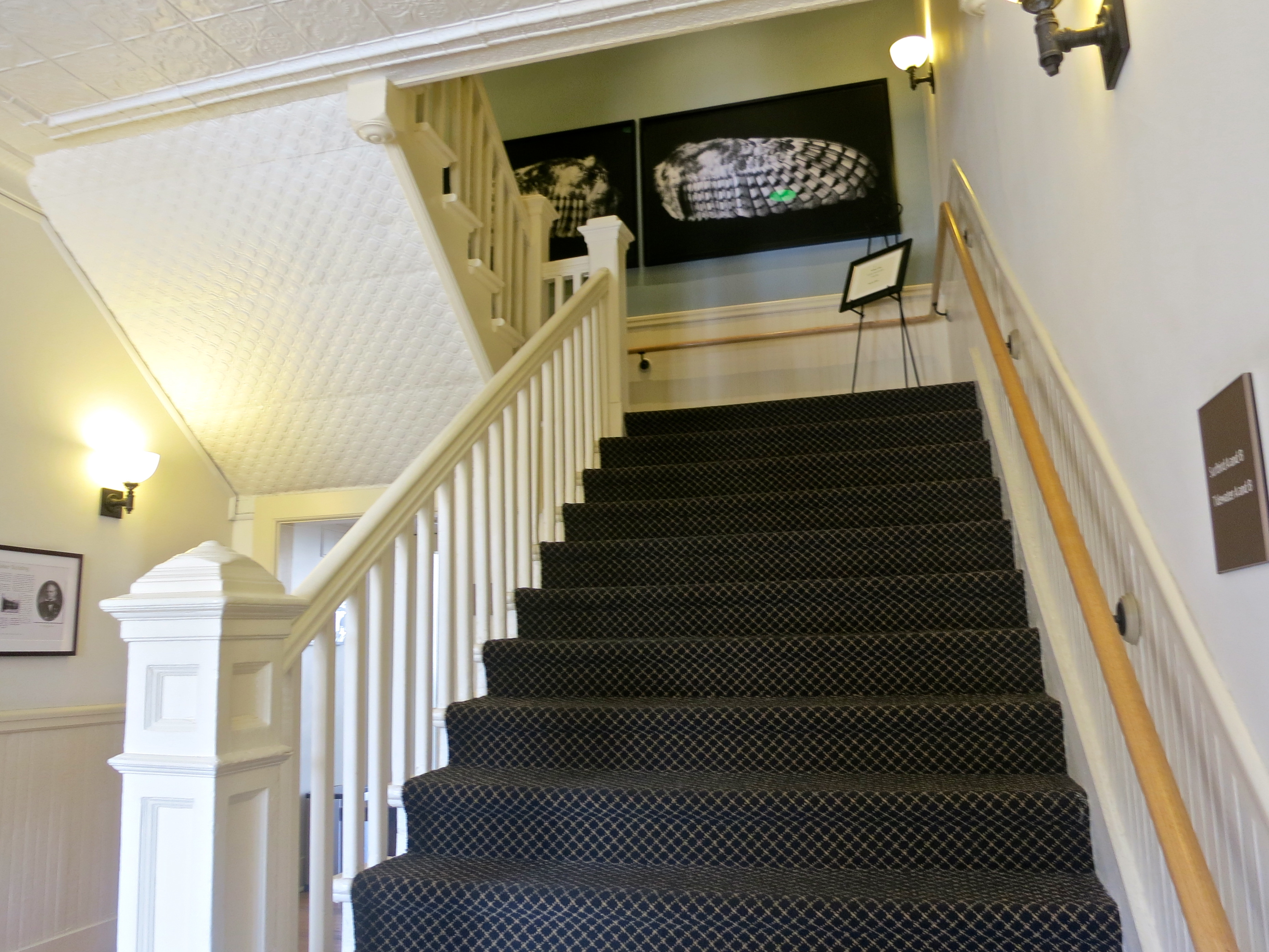

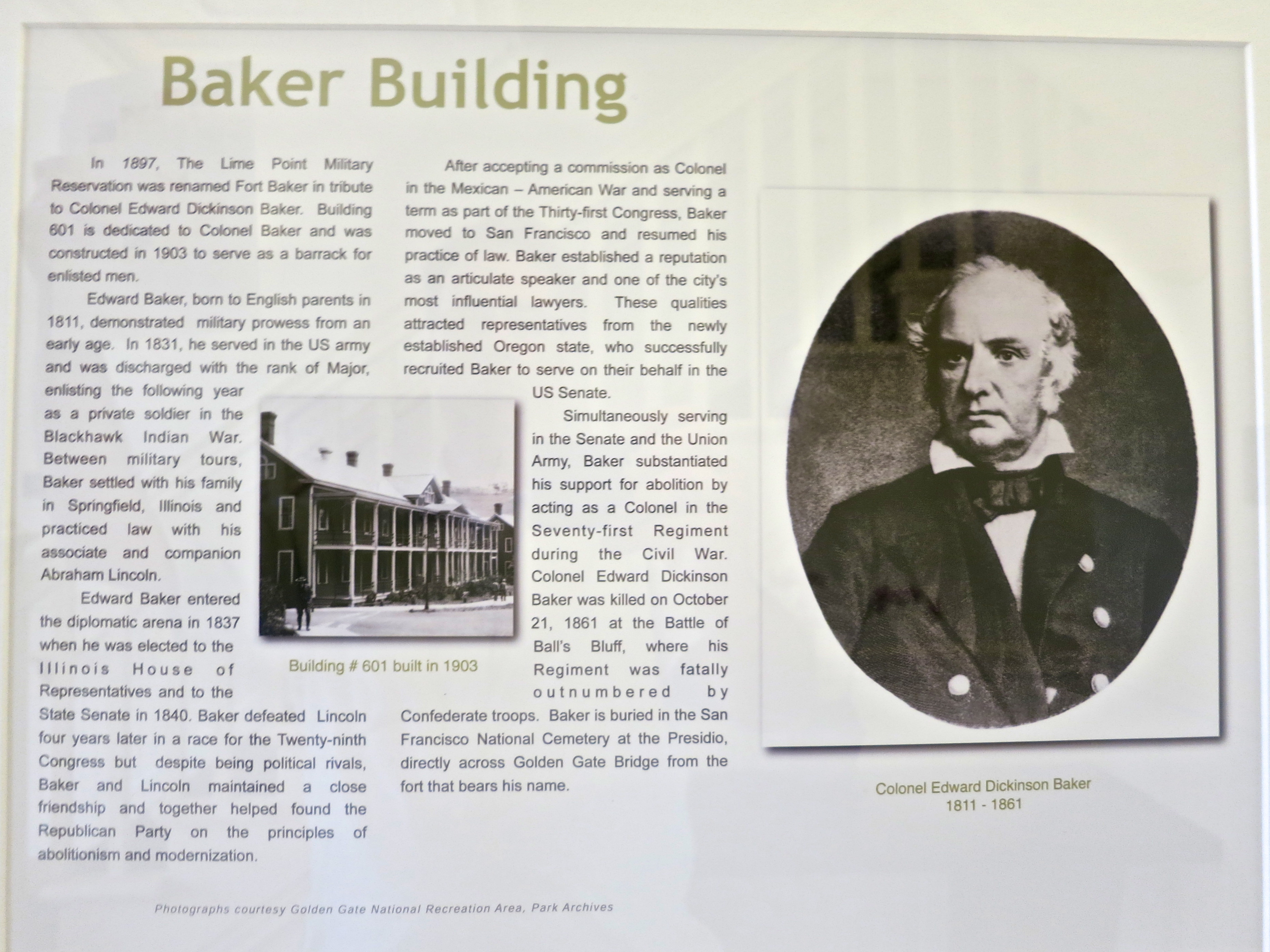
Baker Building Description

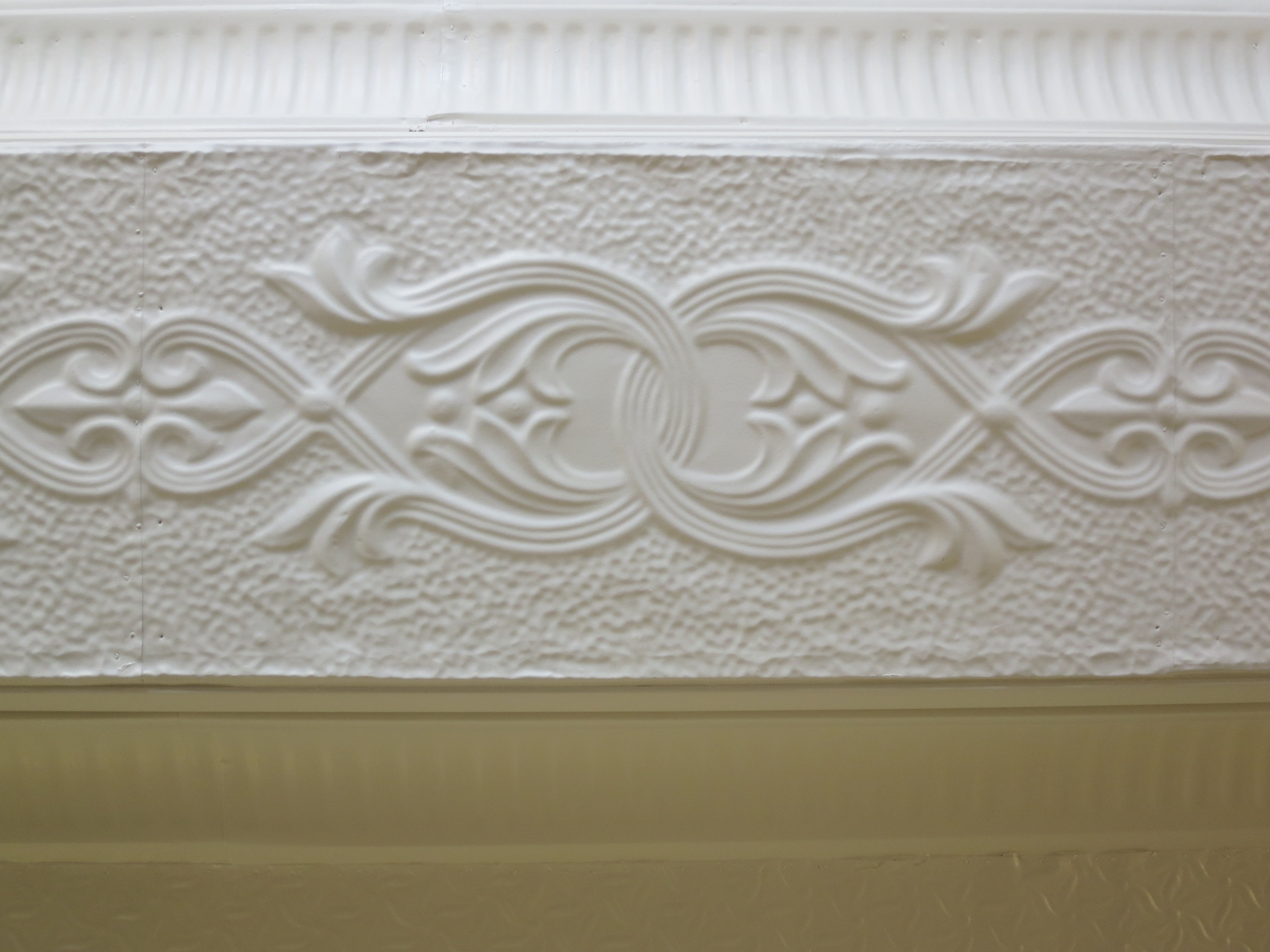

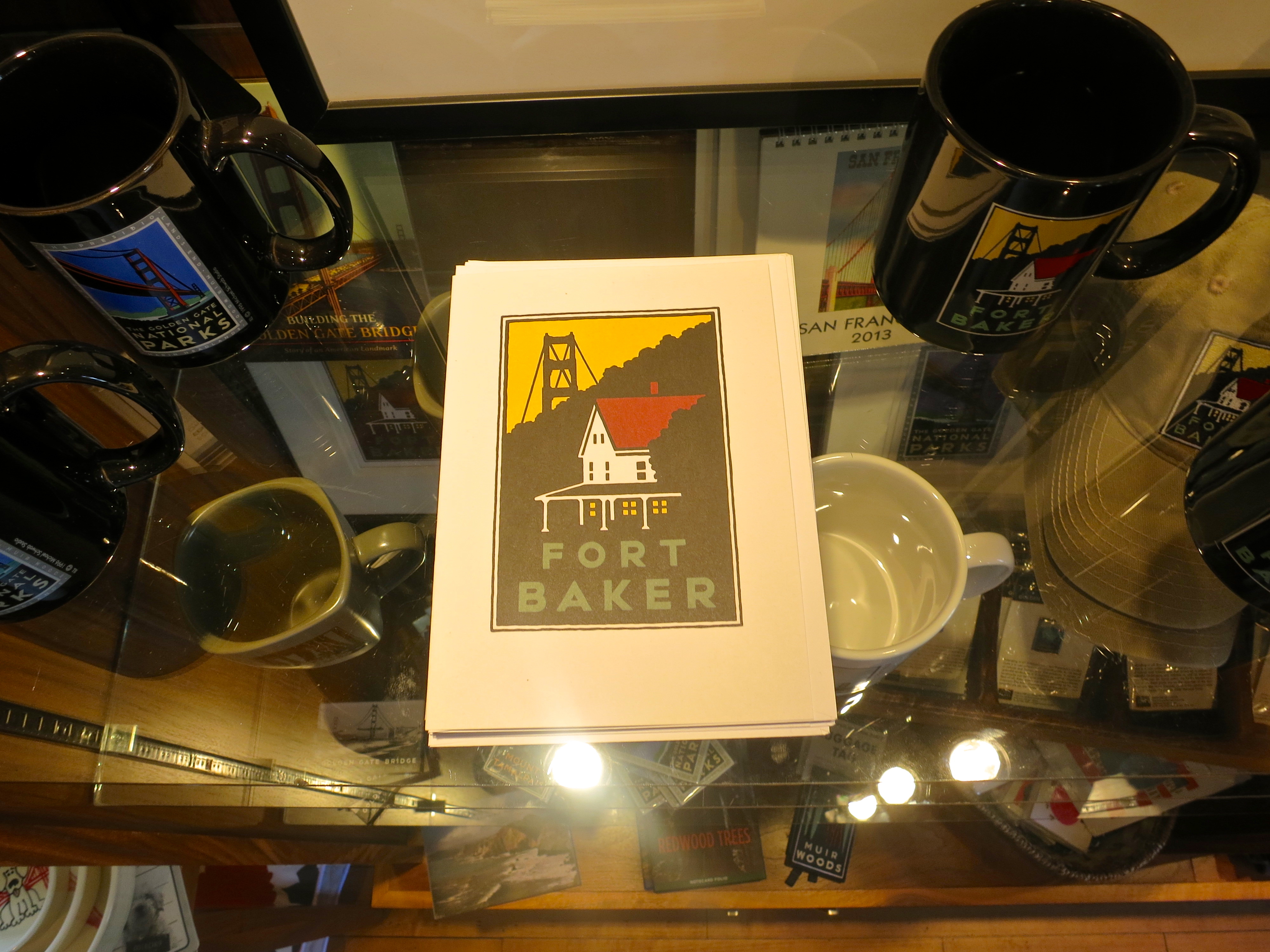

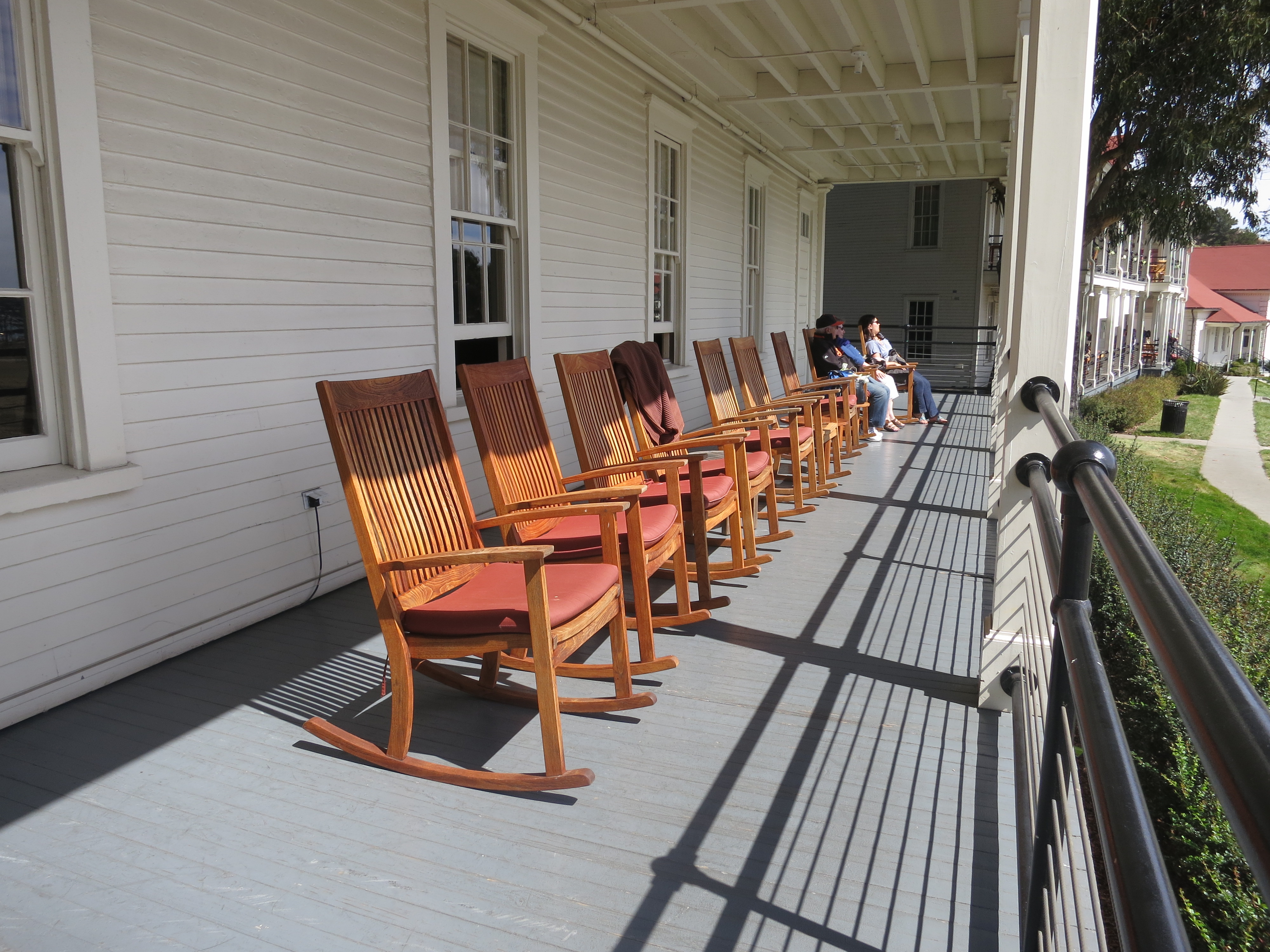

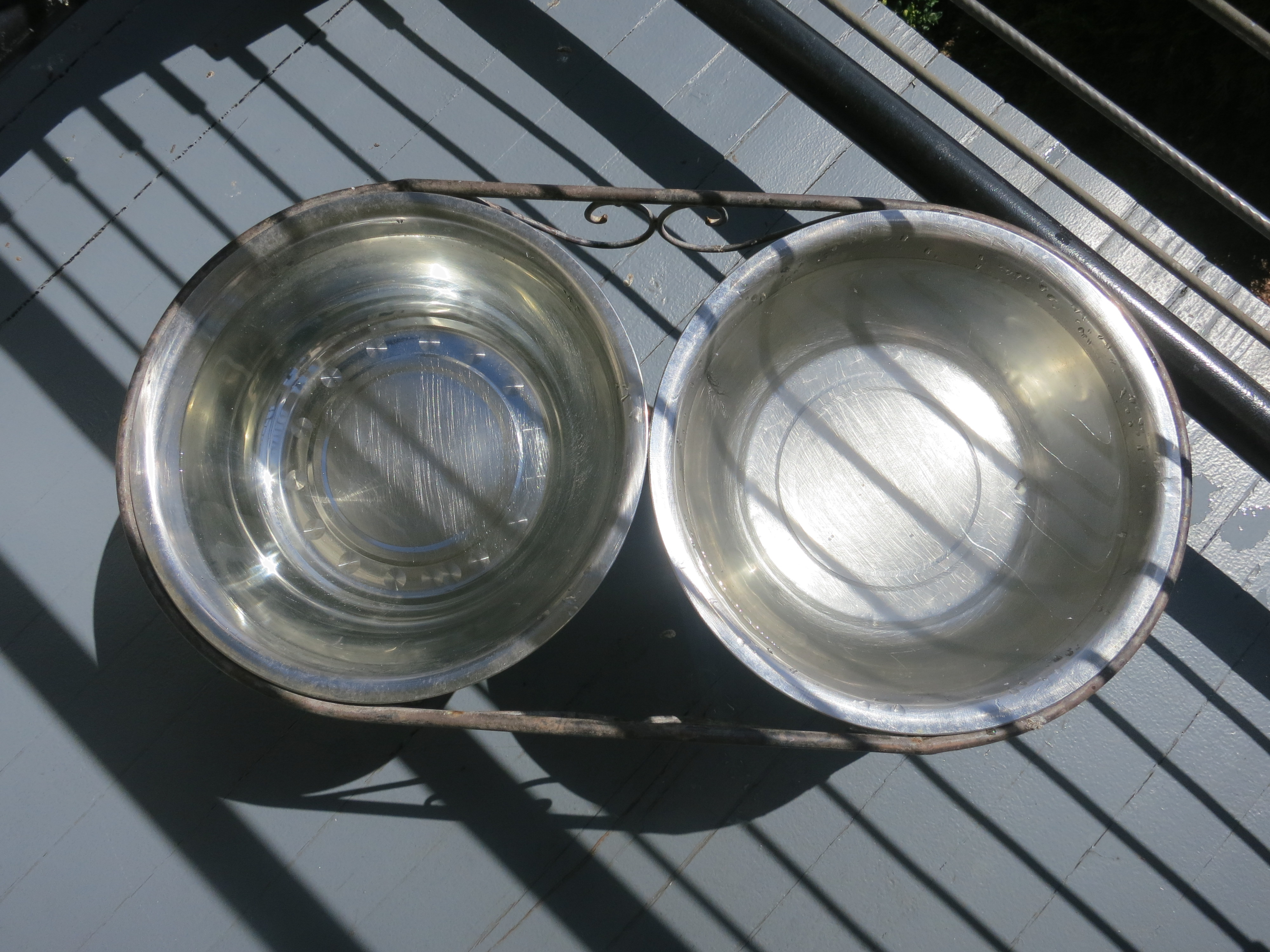

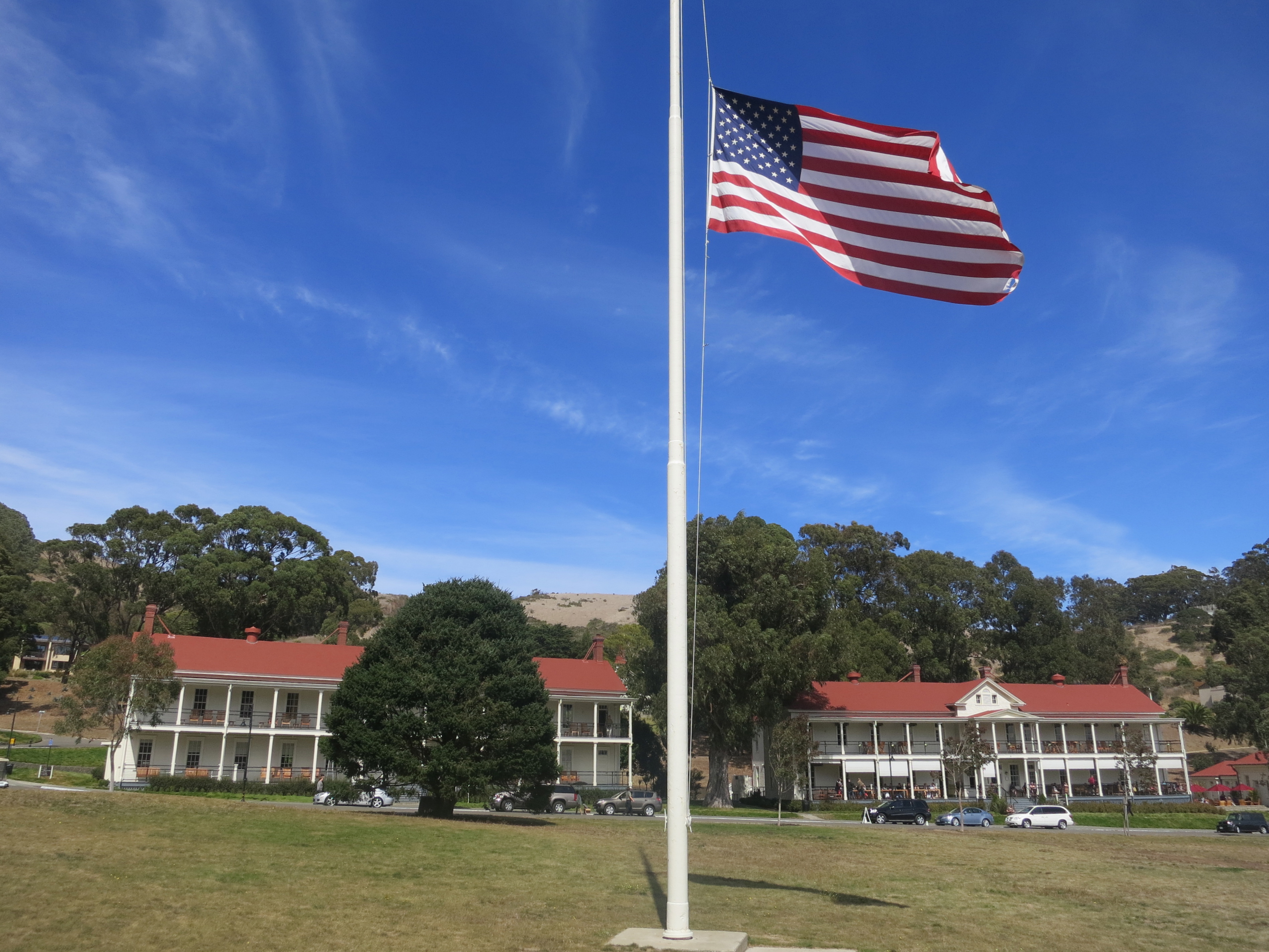

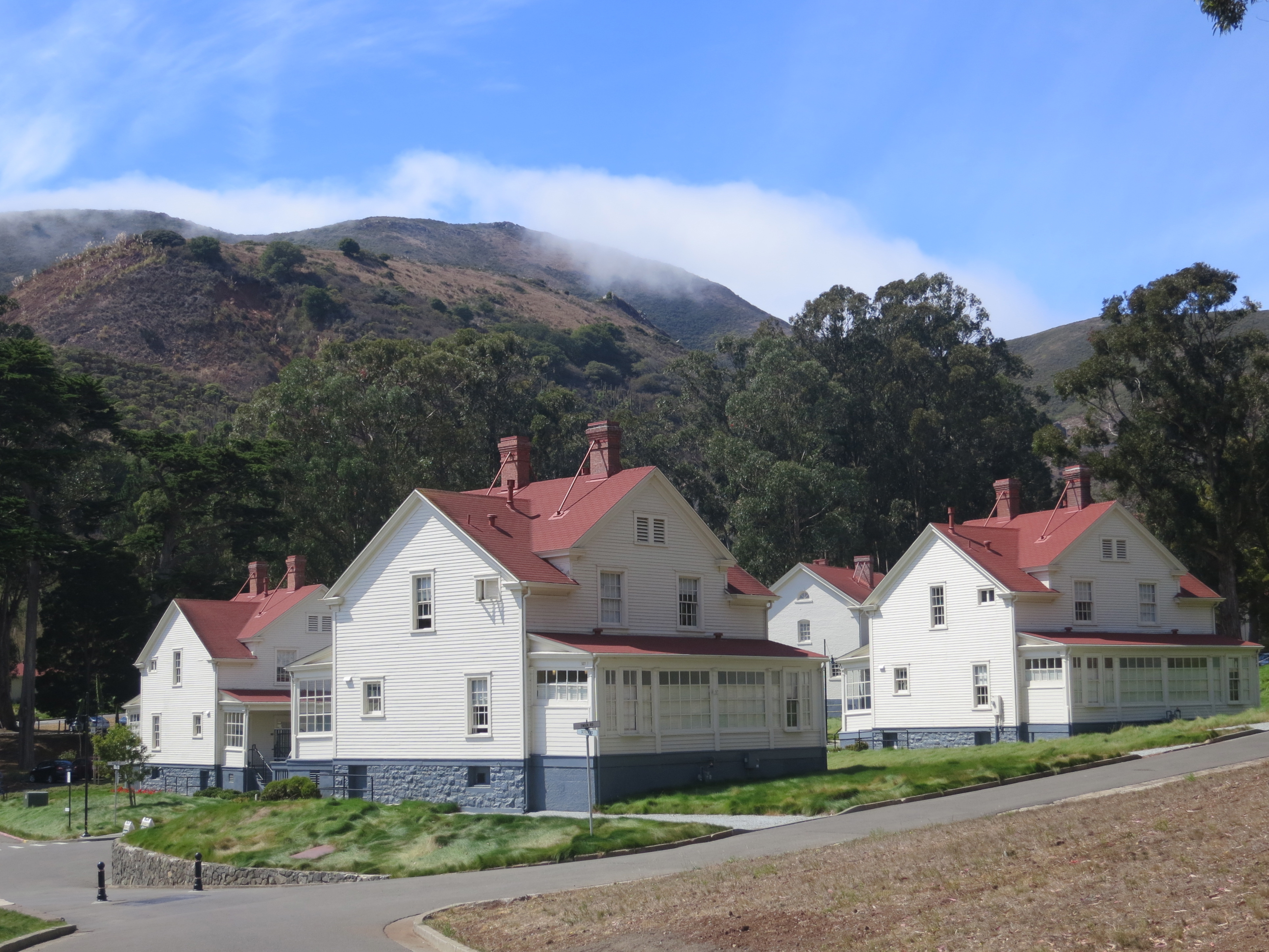

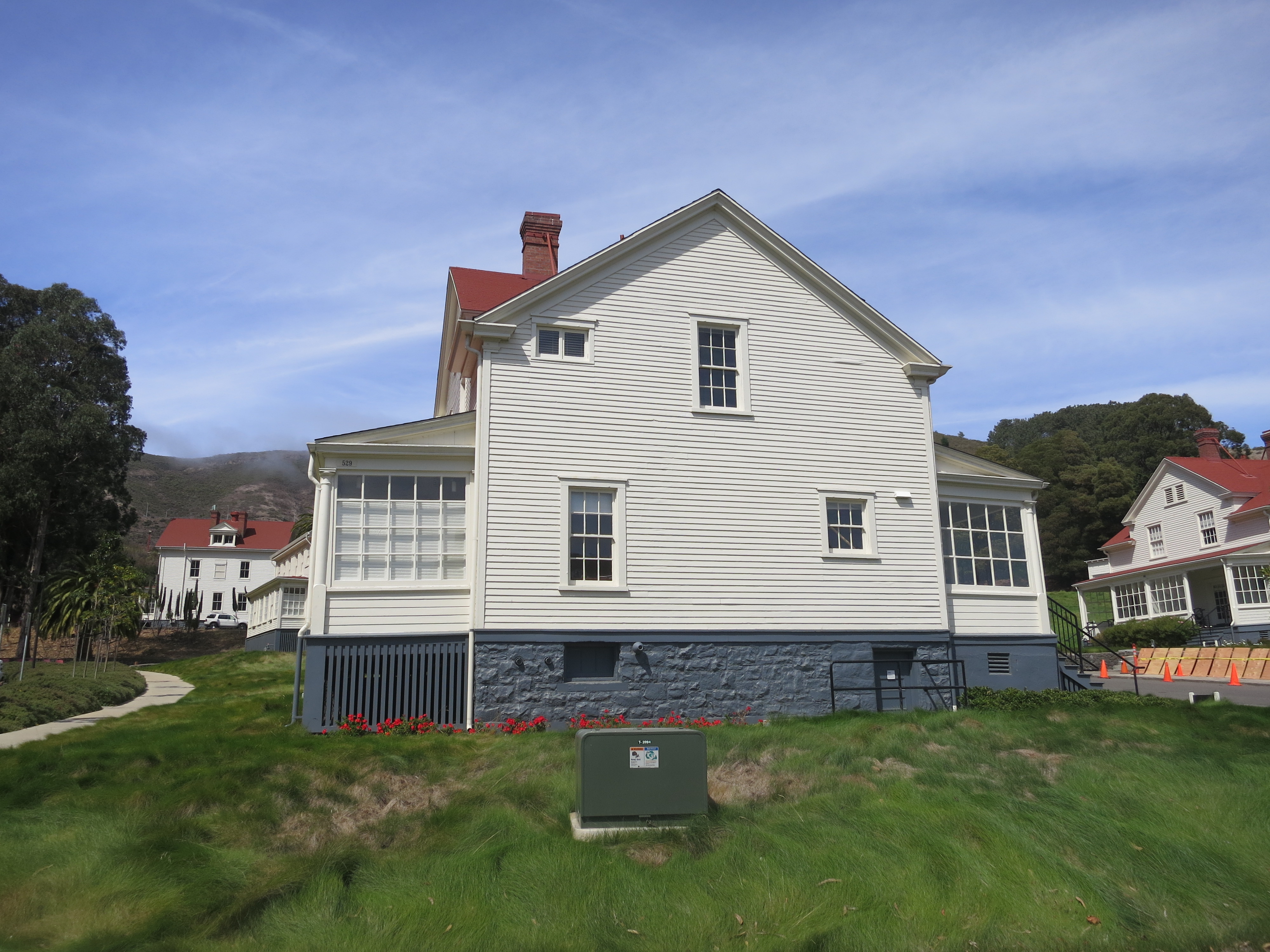

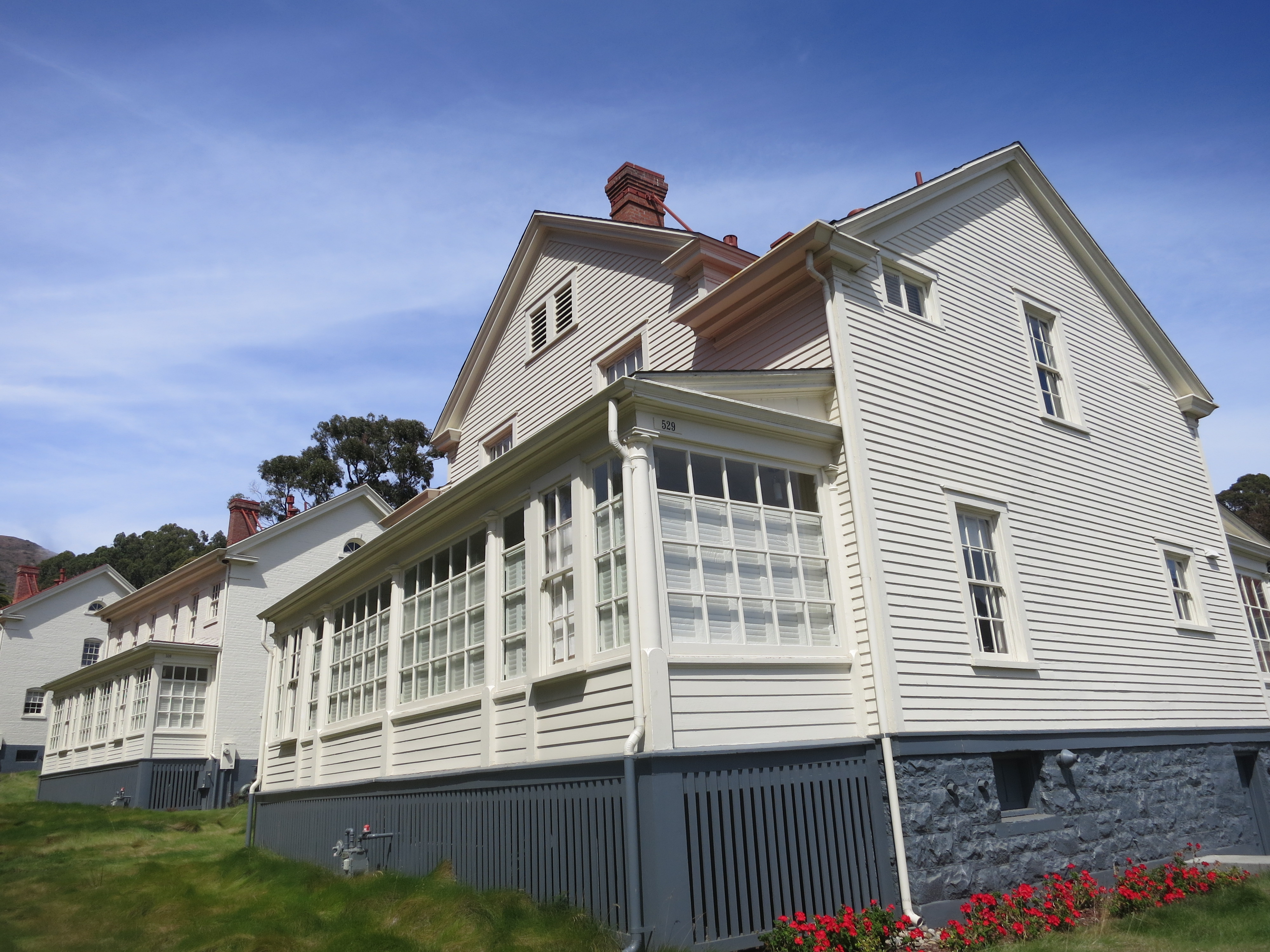

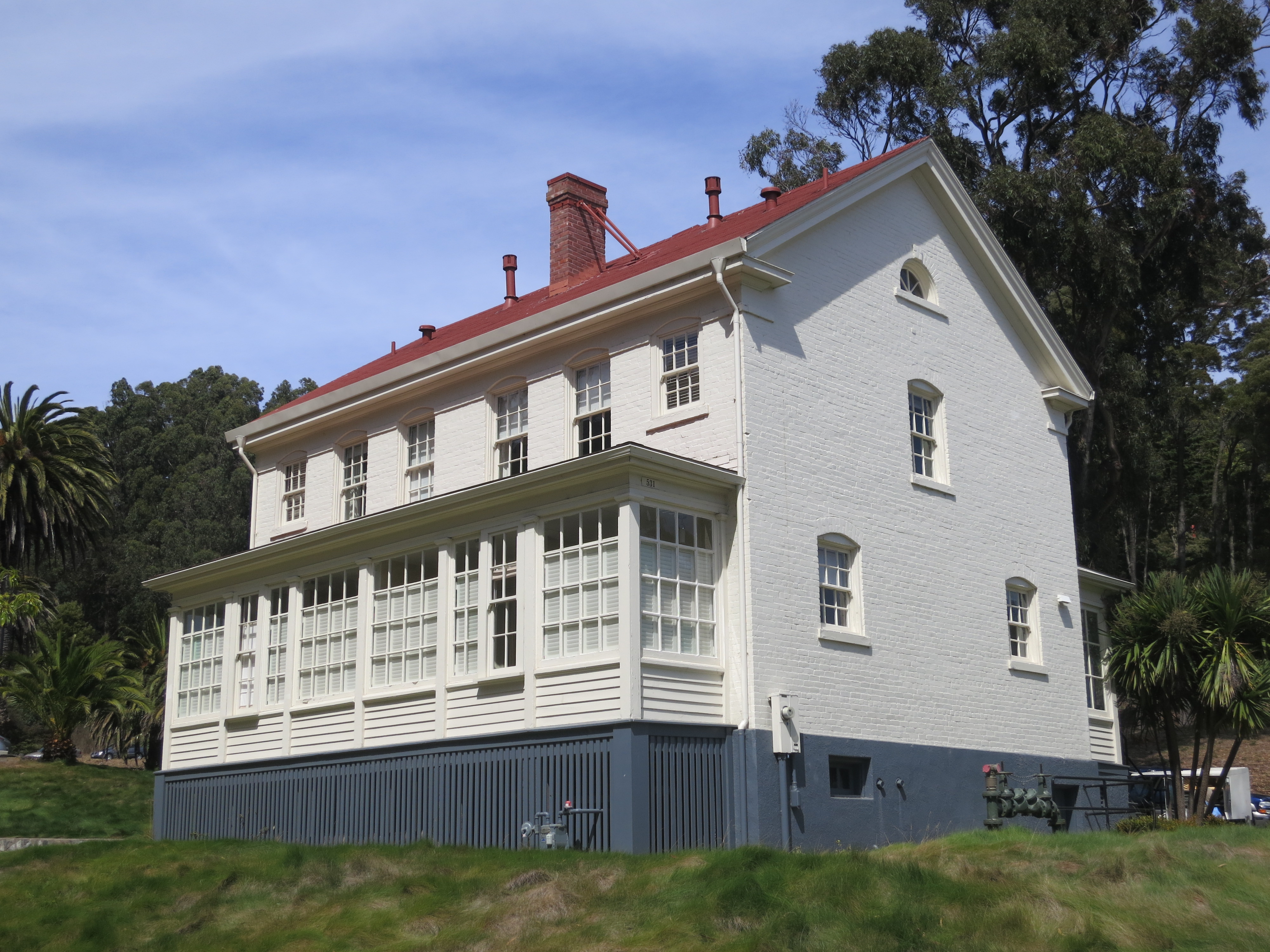

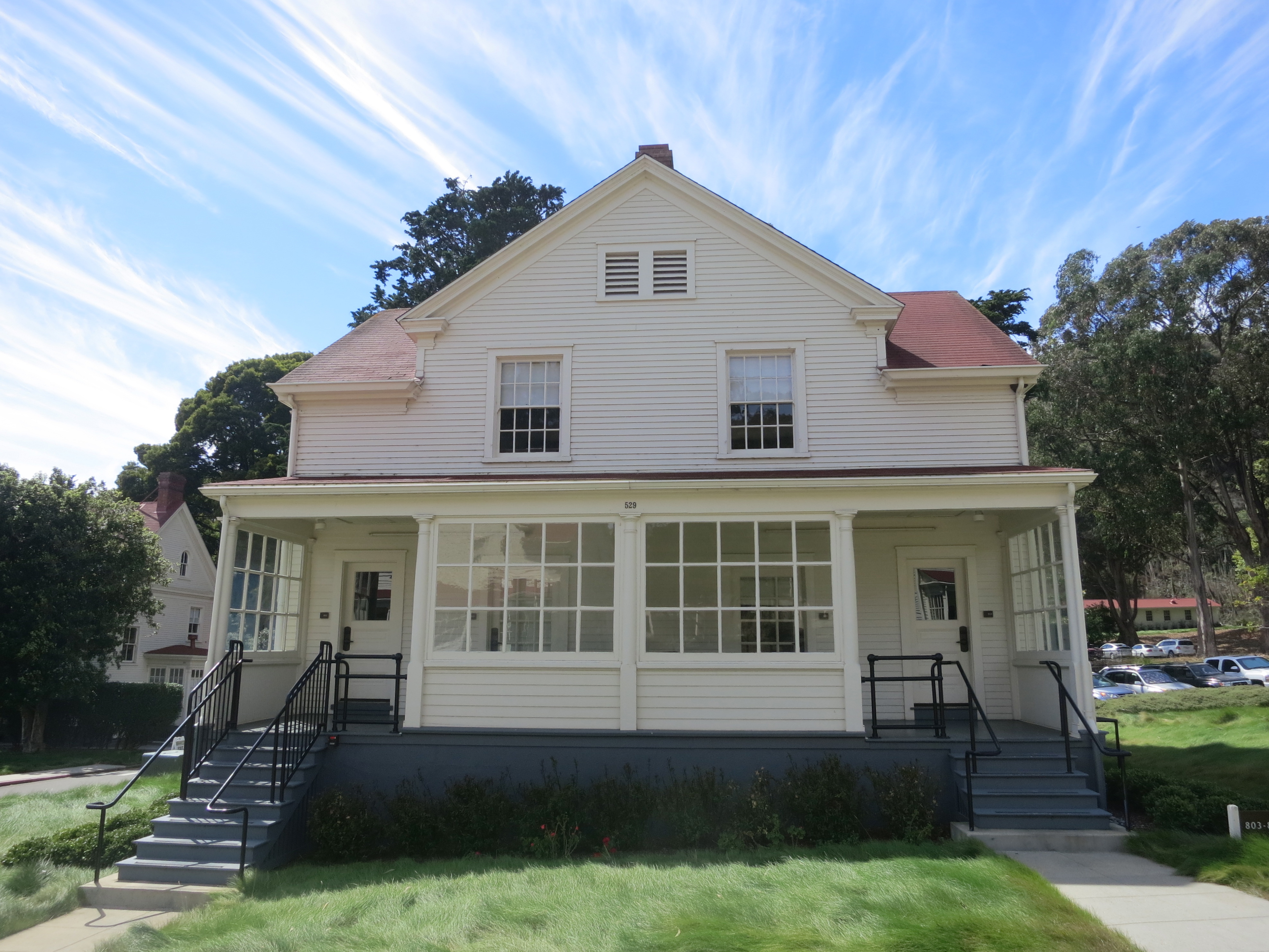

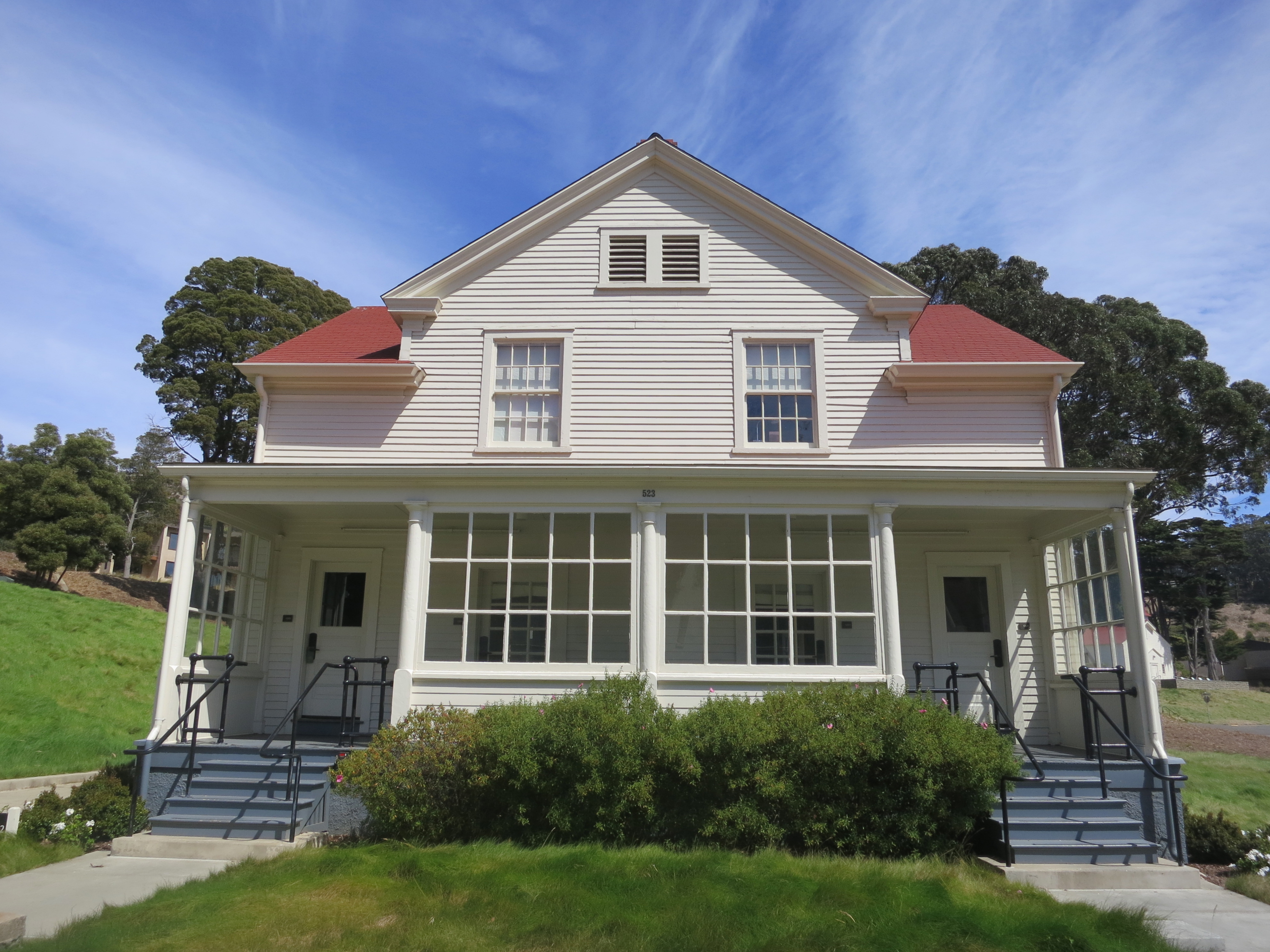

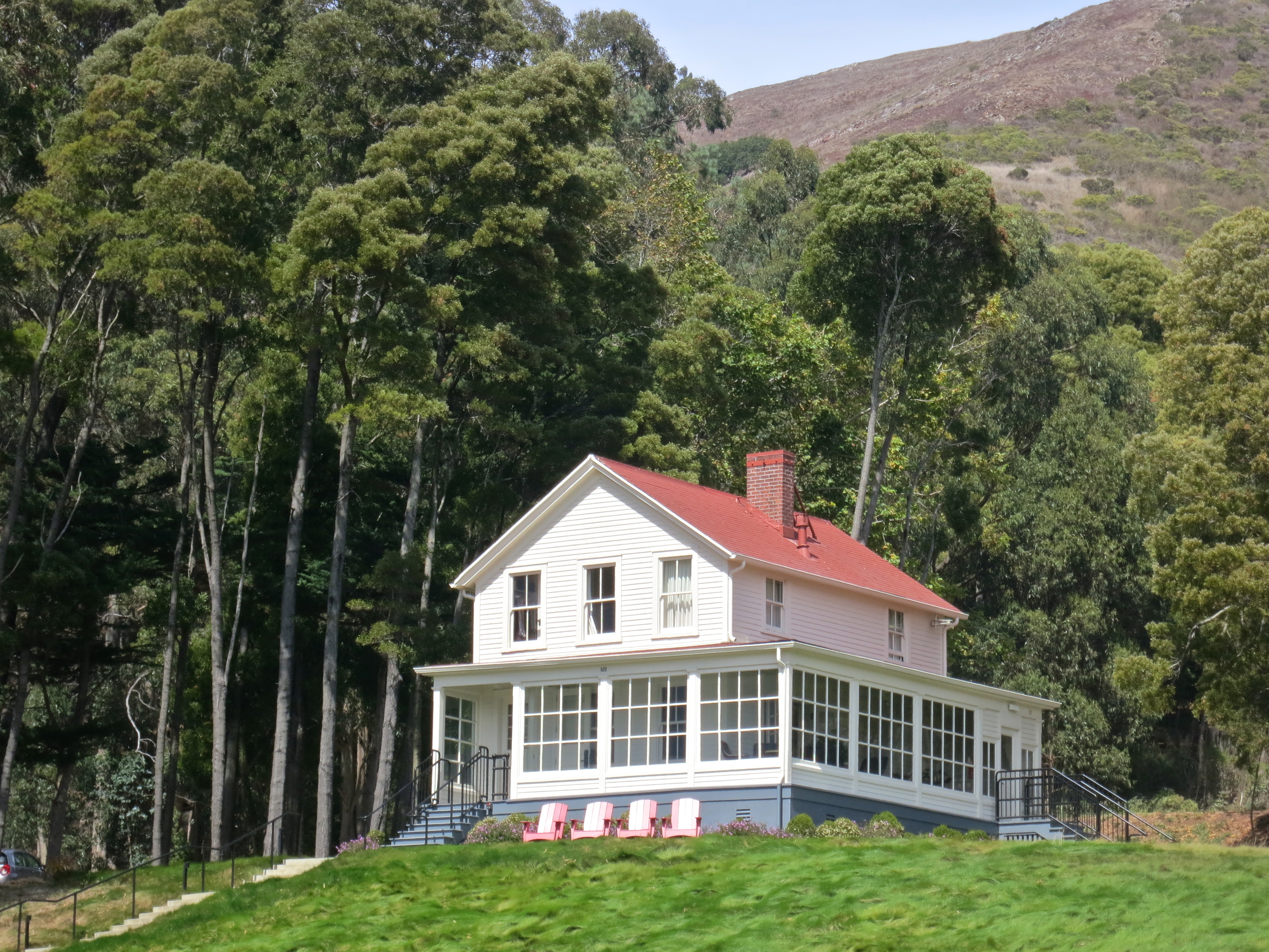

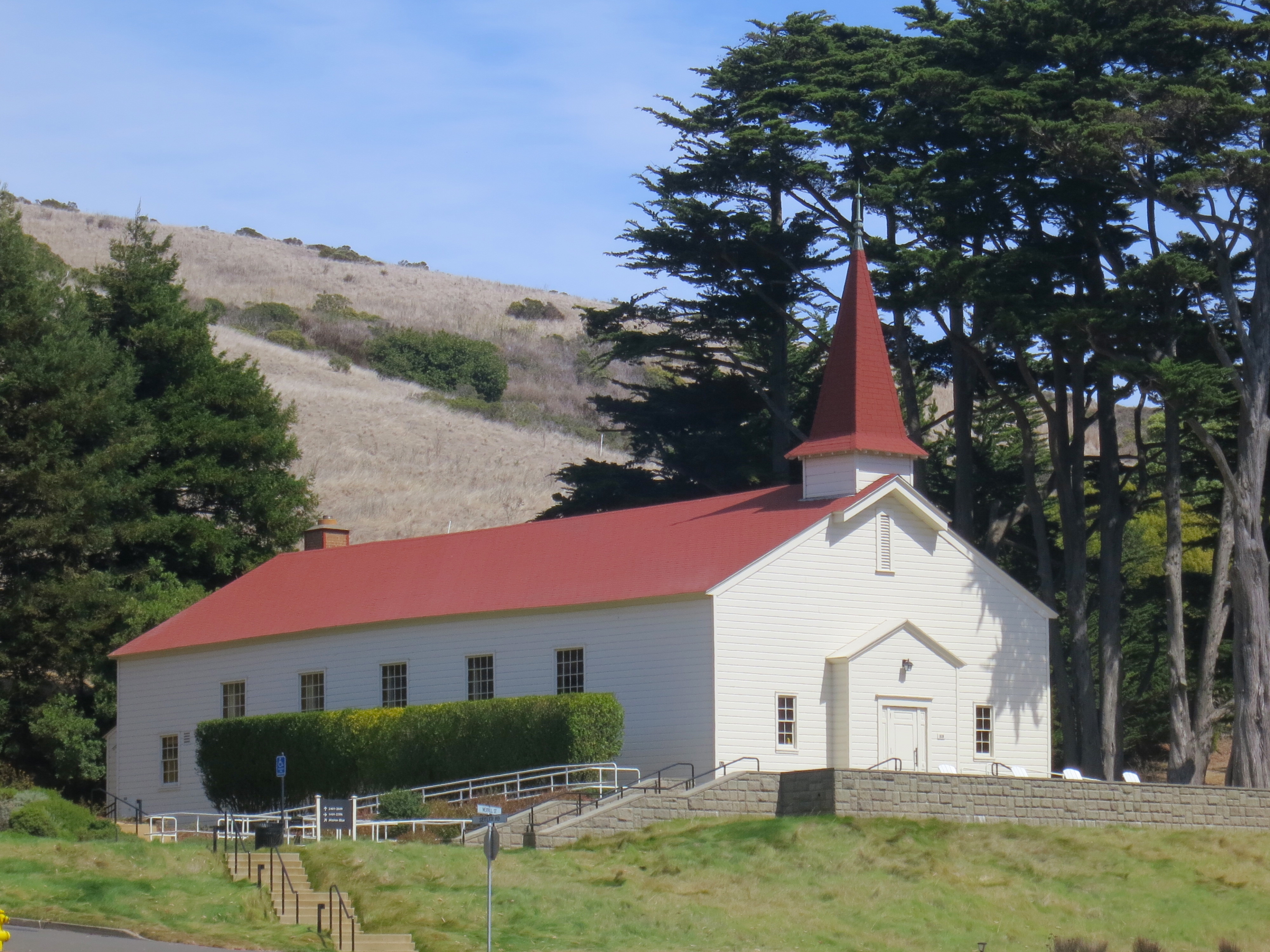

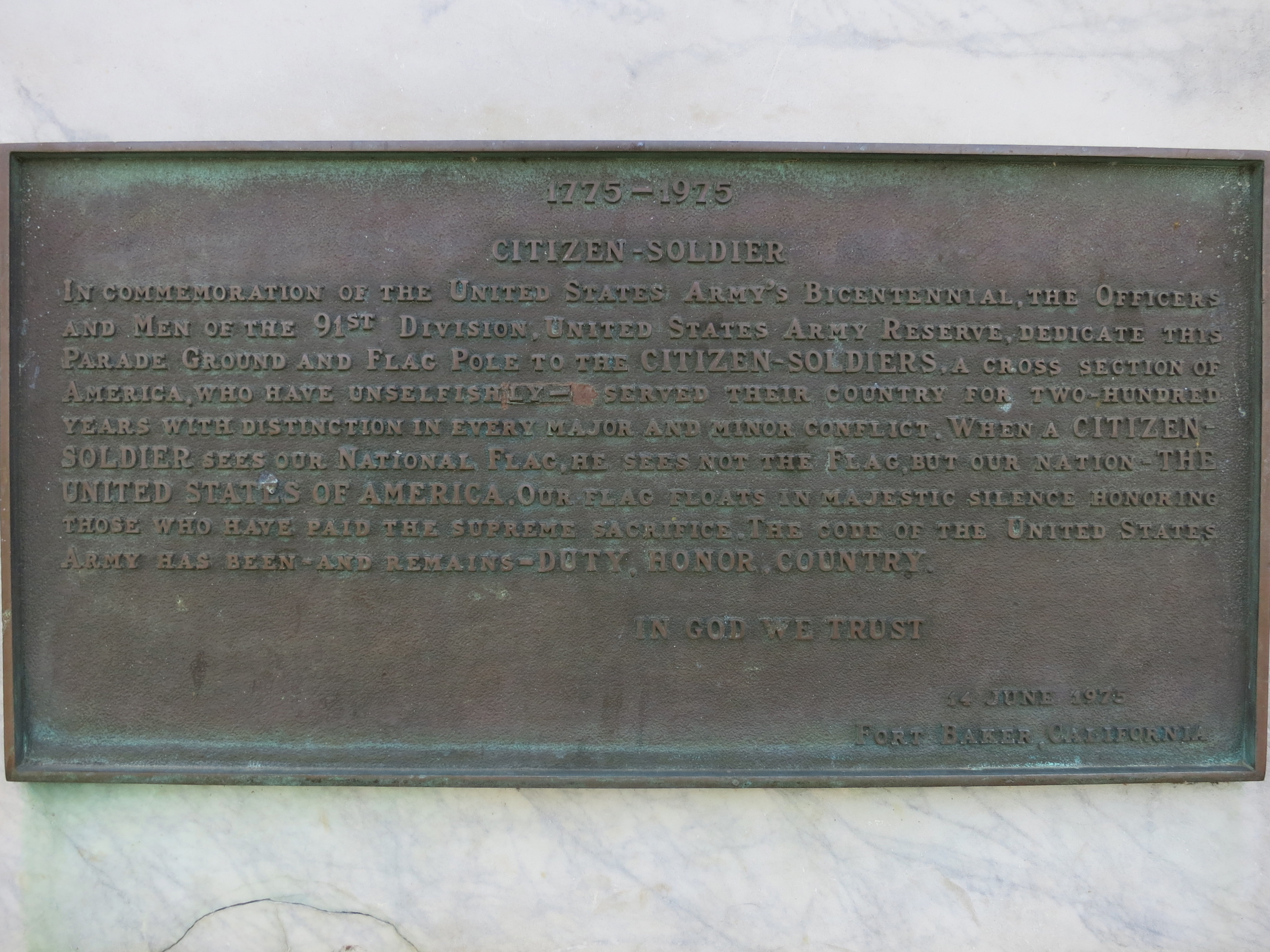

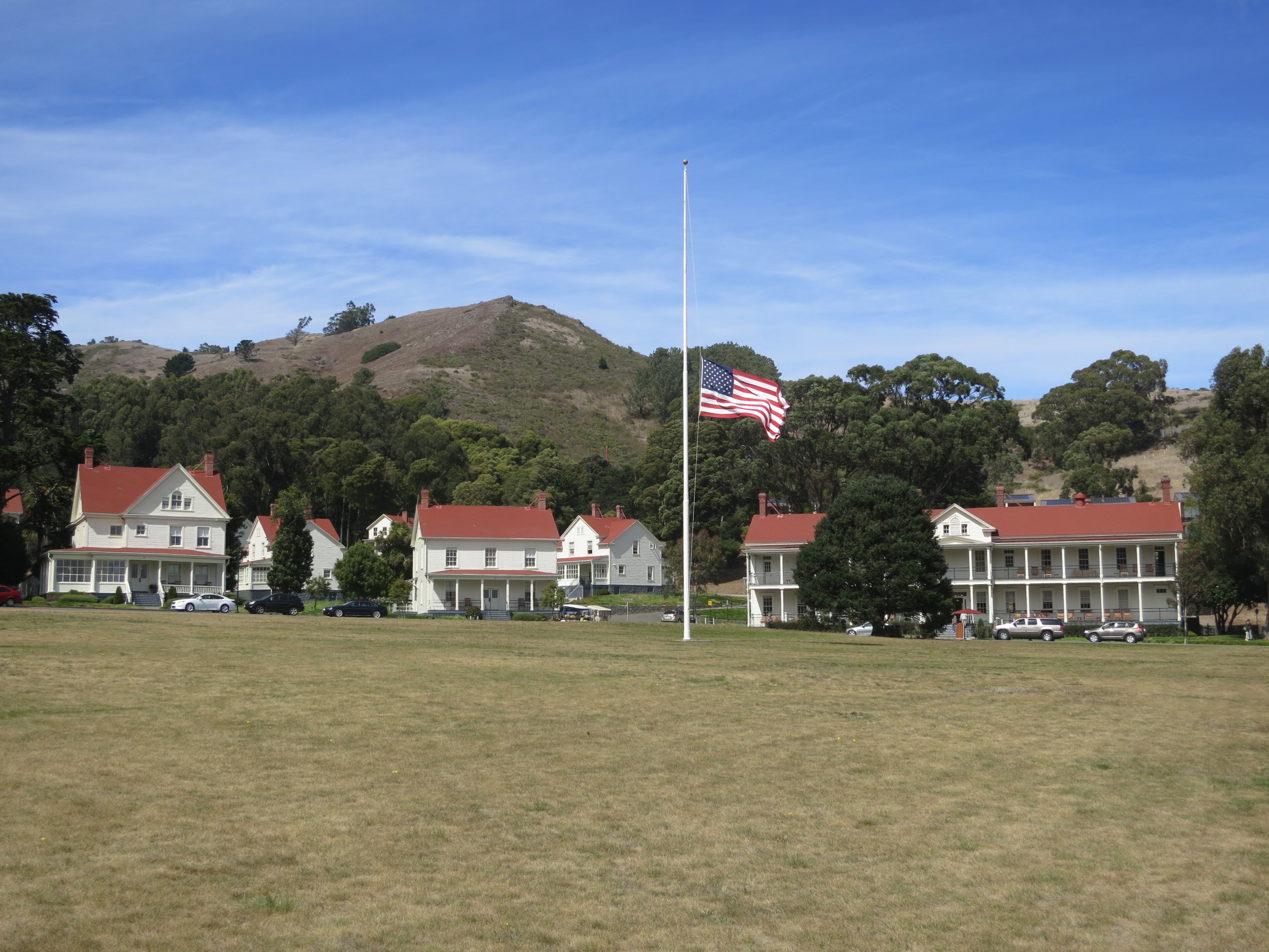

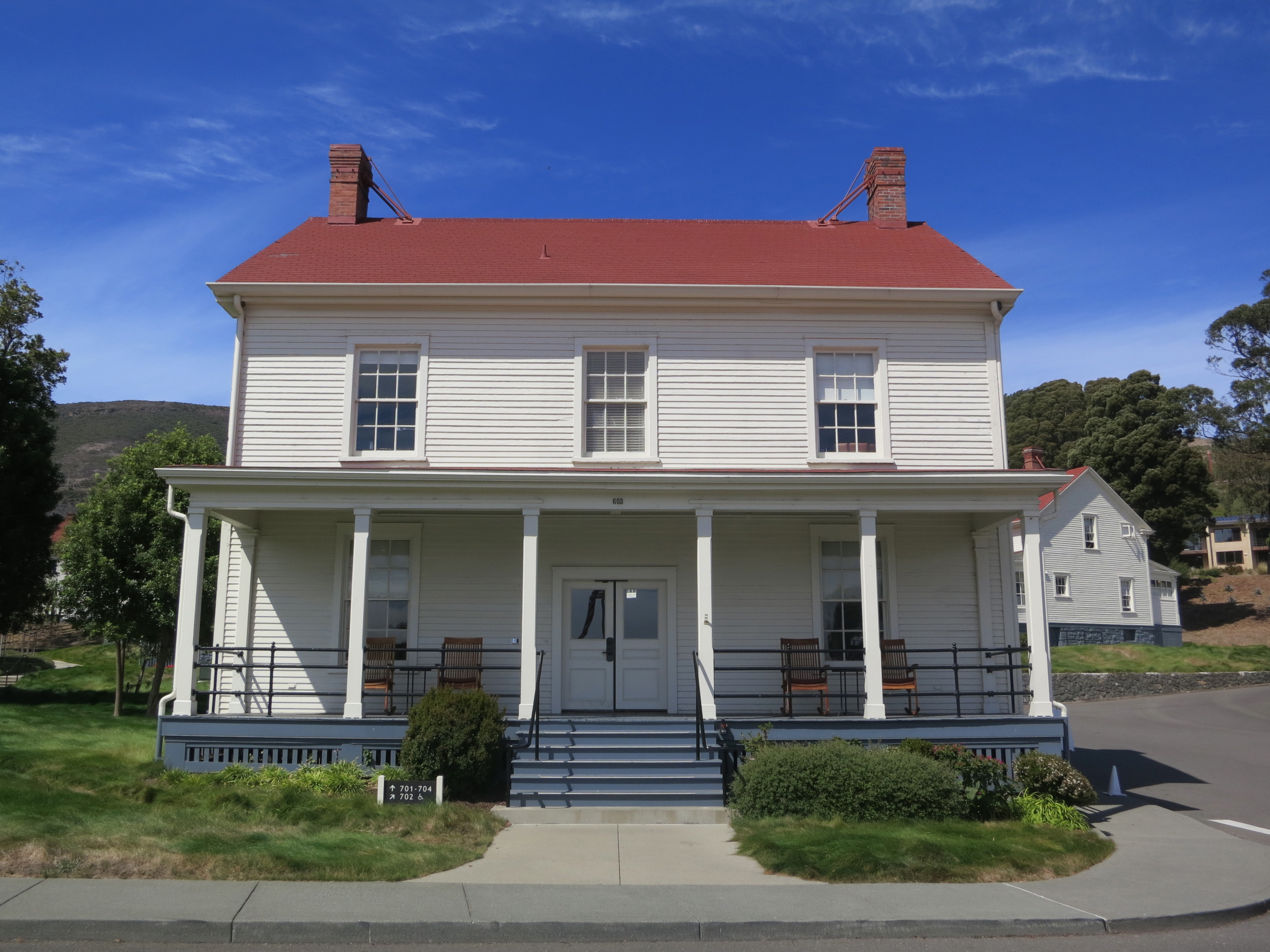

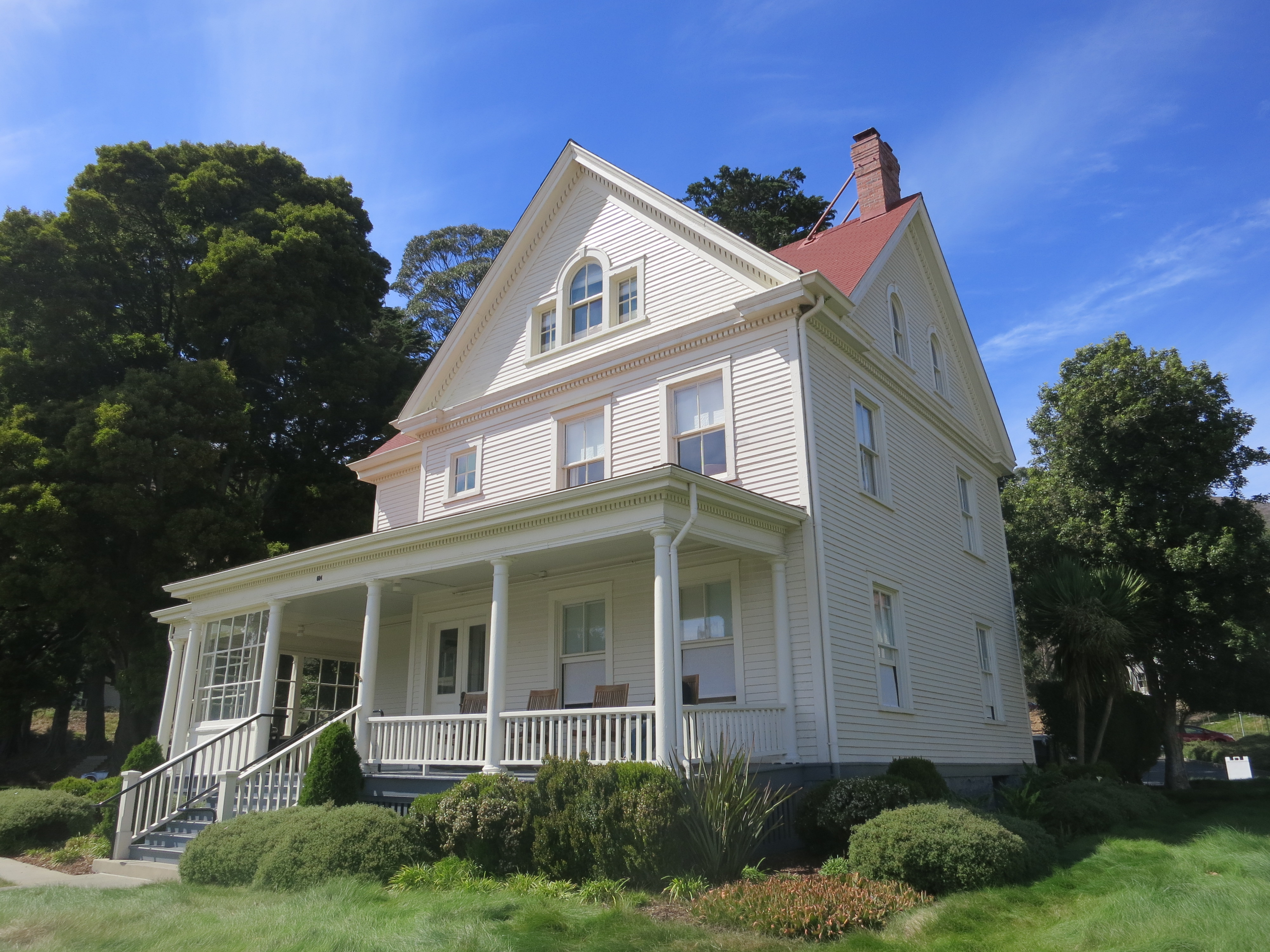

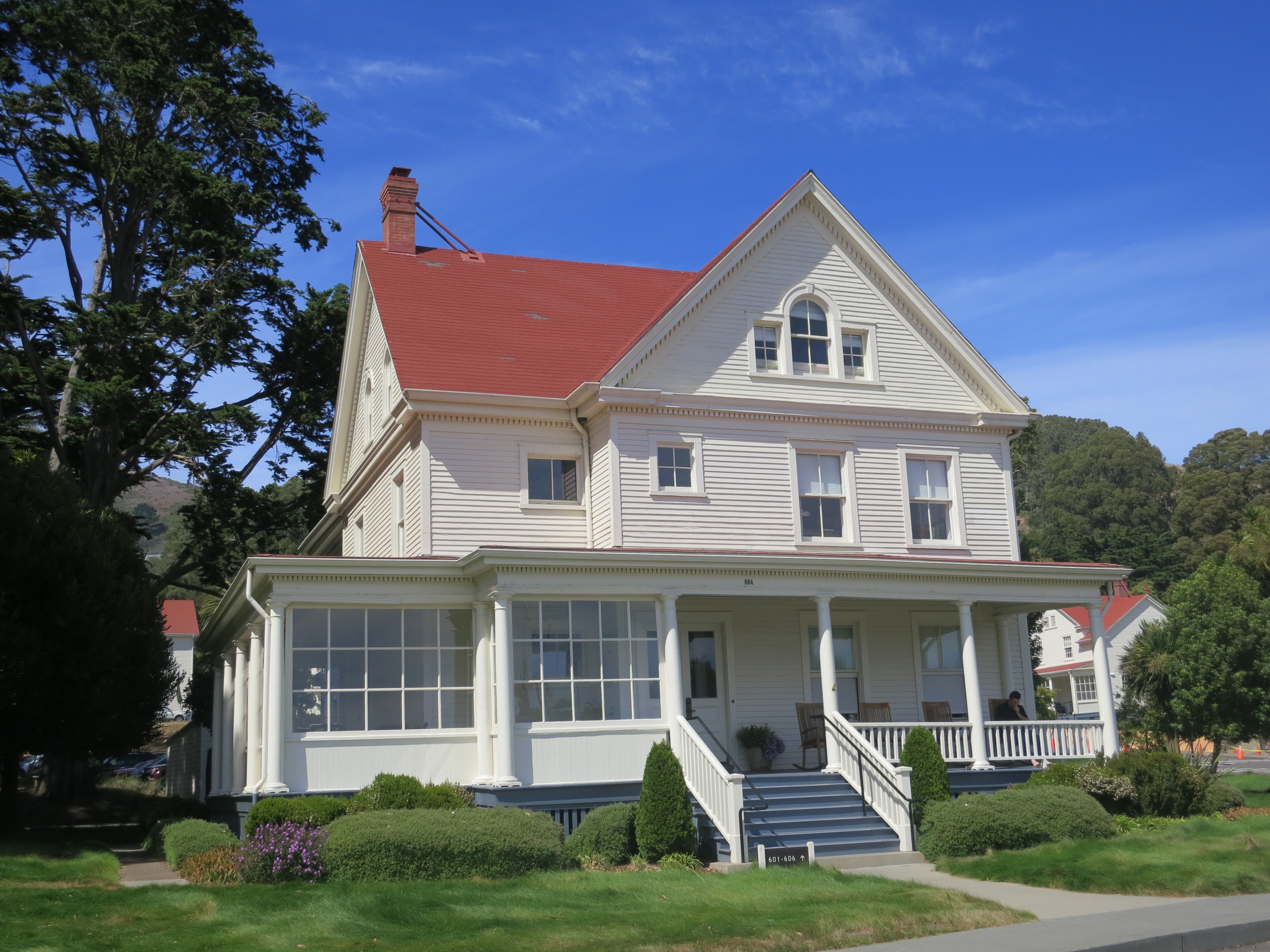

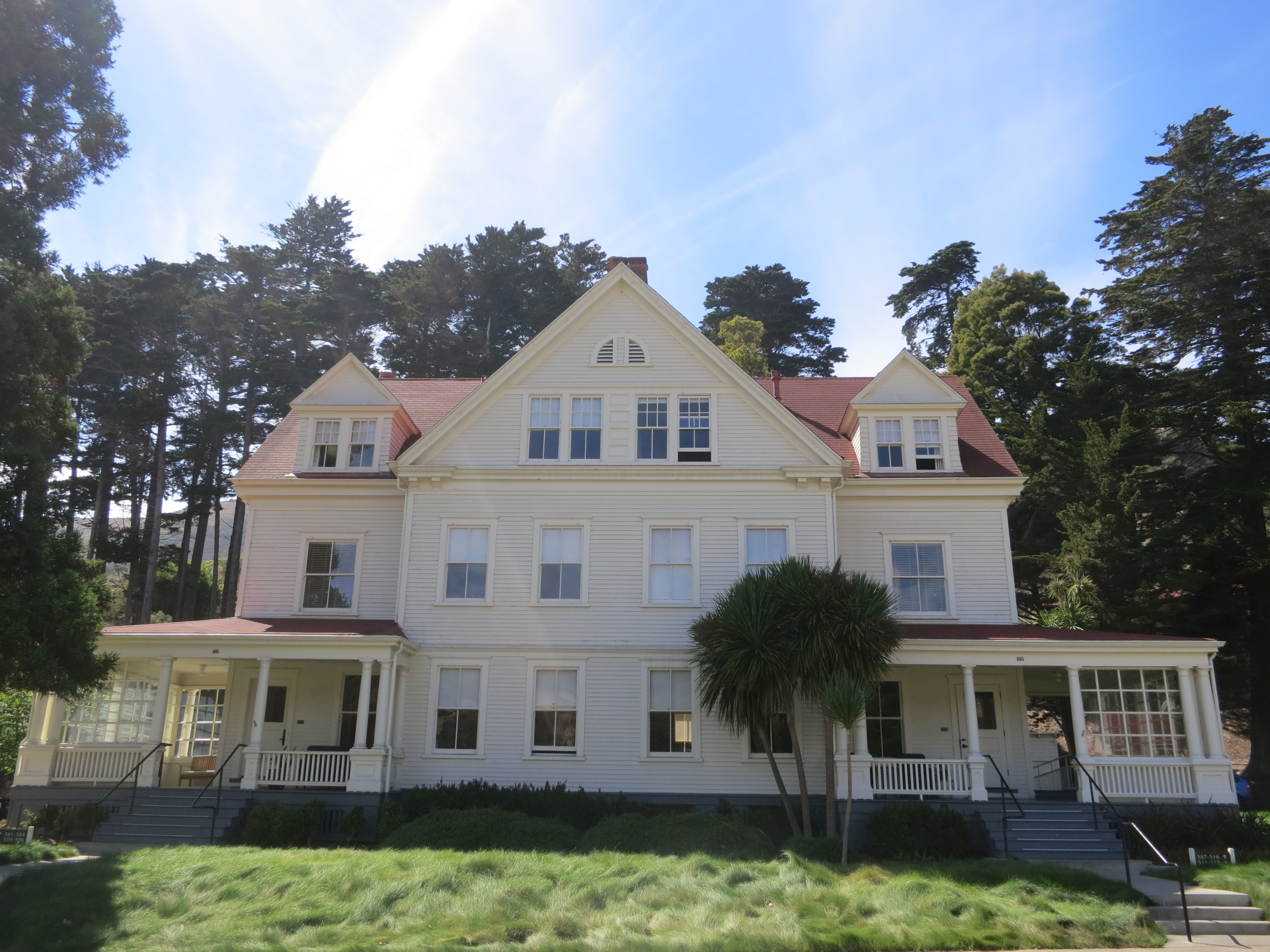

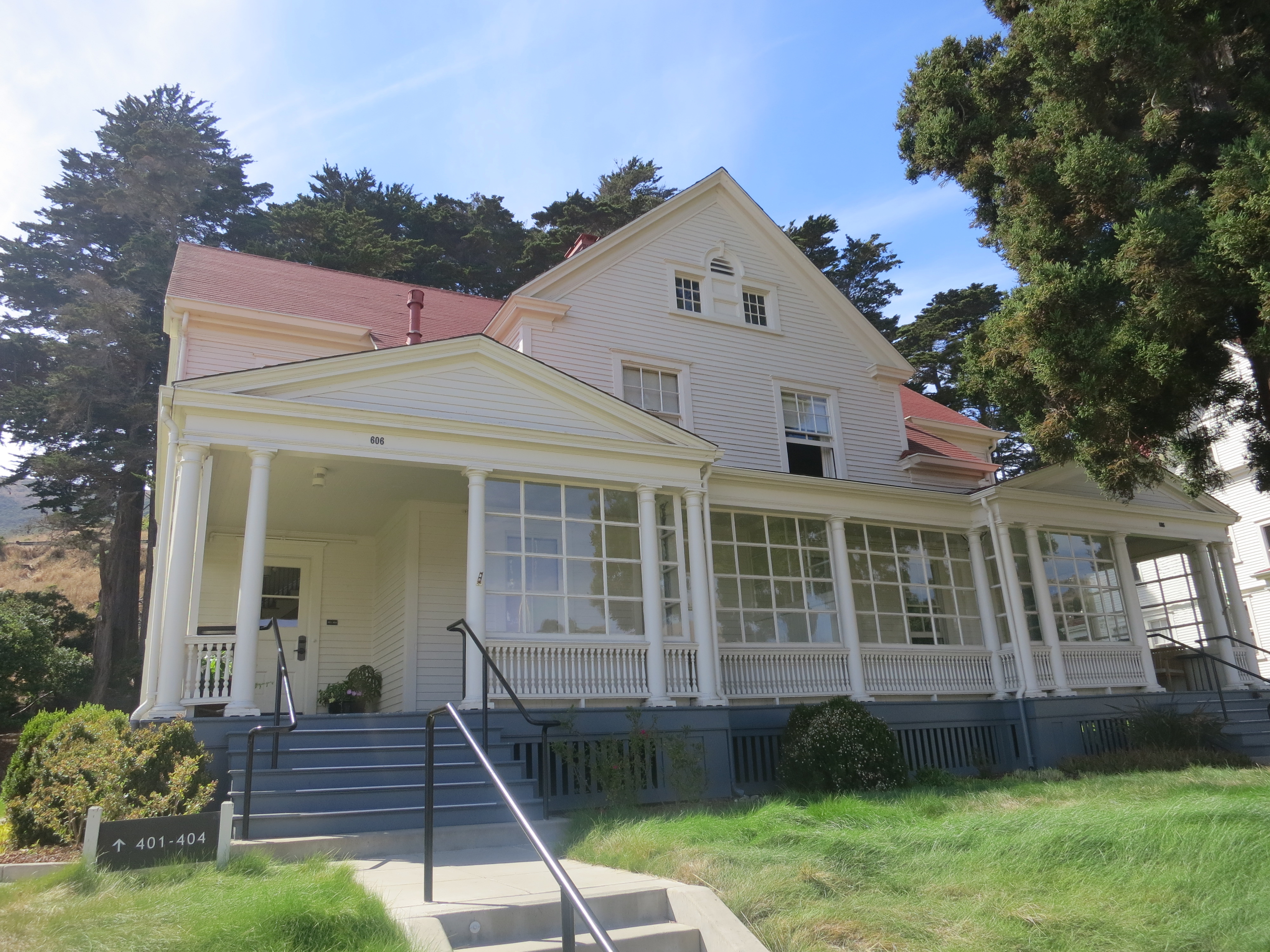

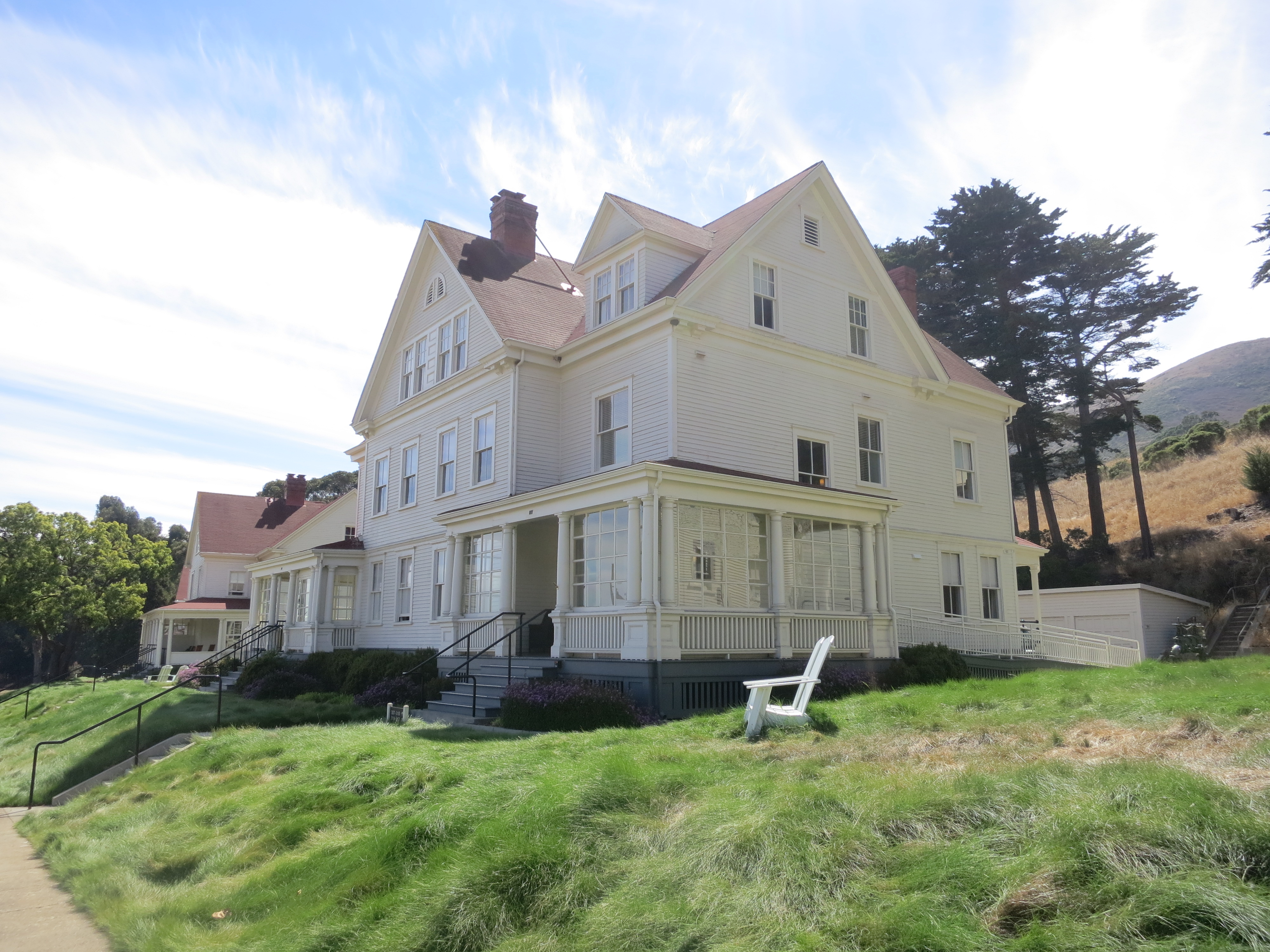

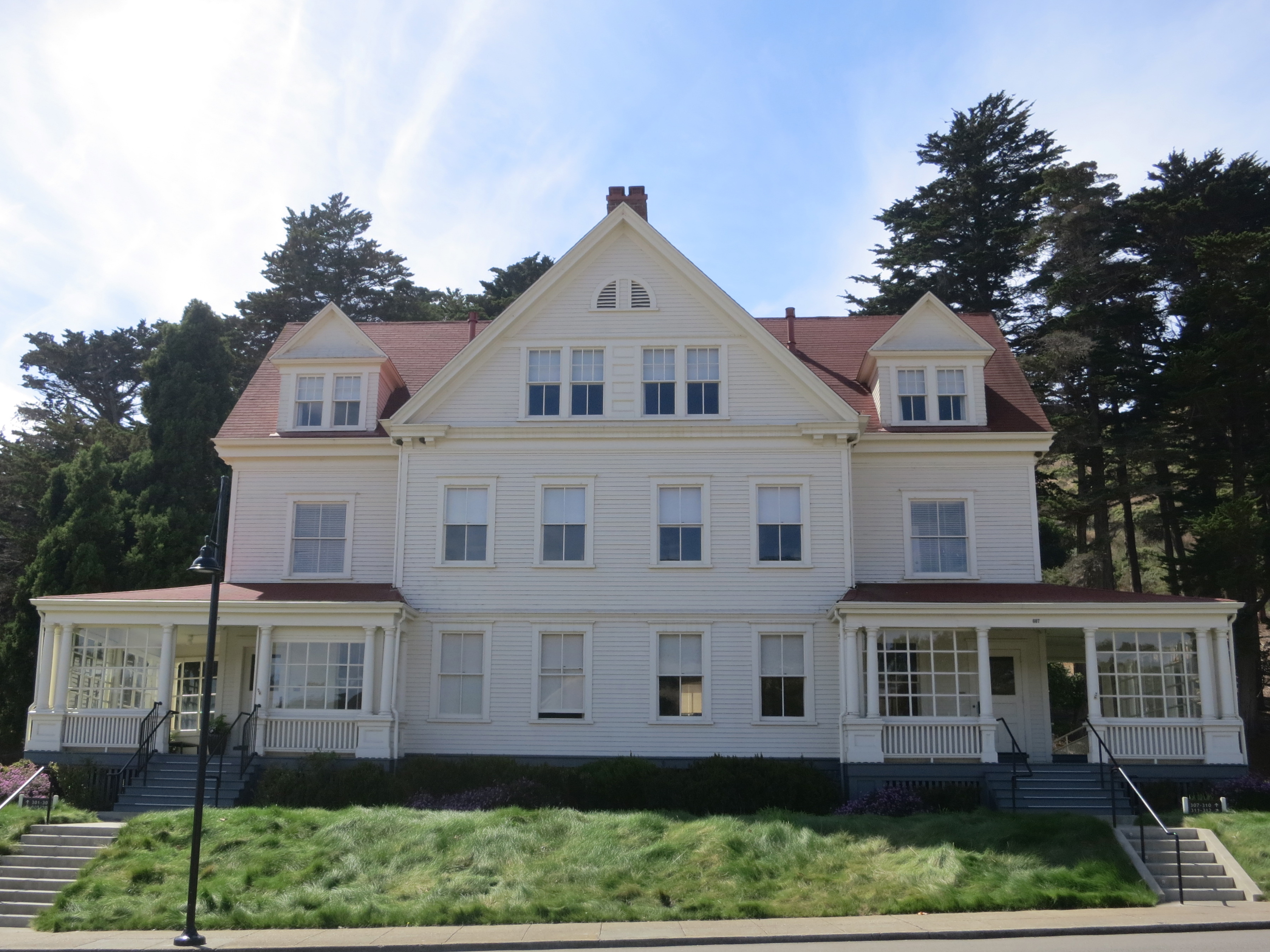

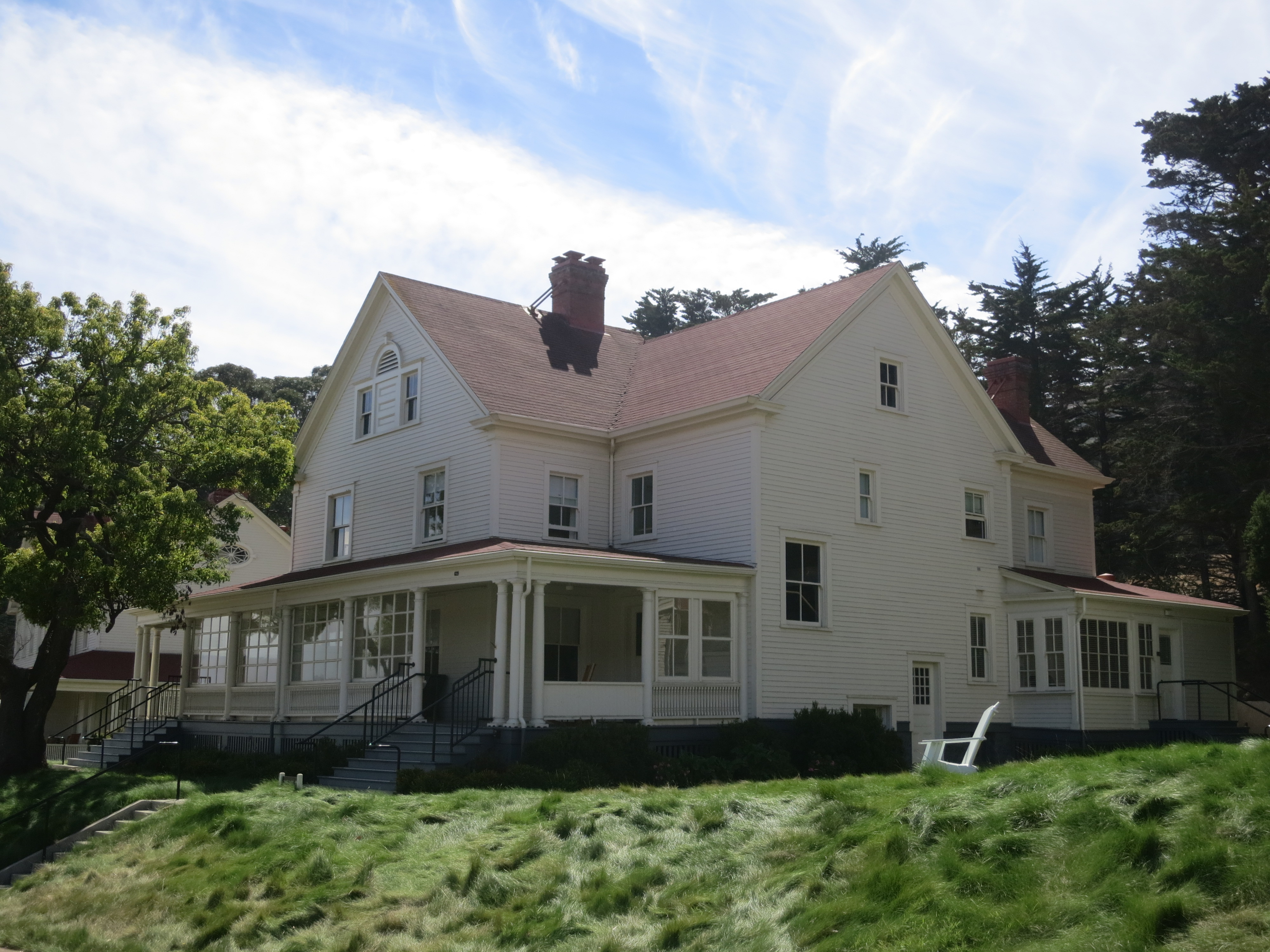

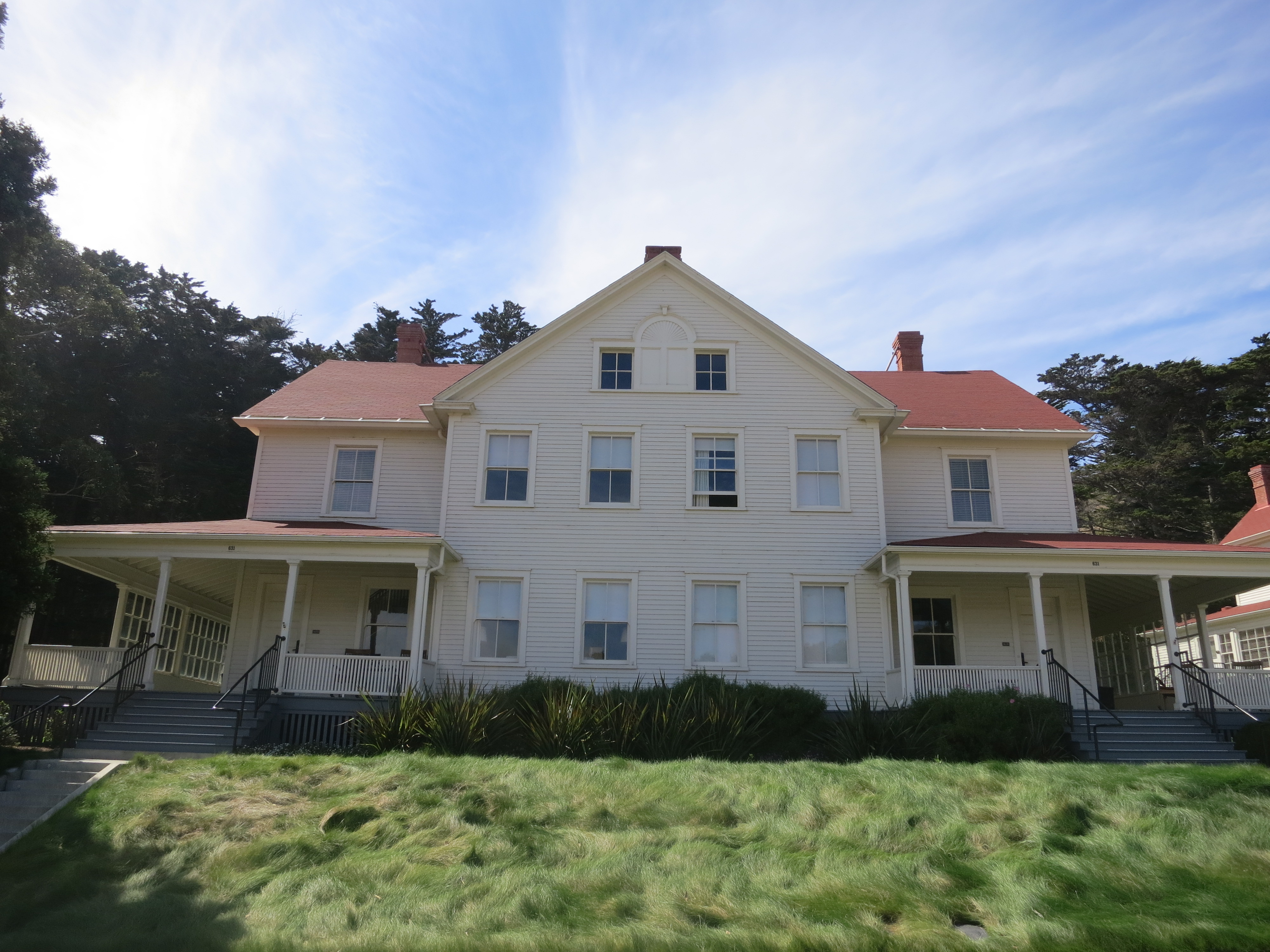

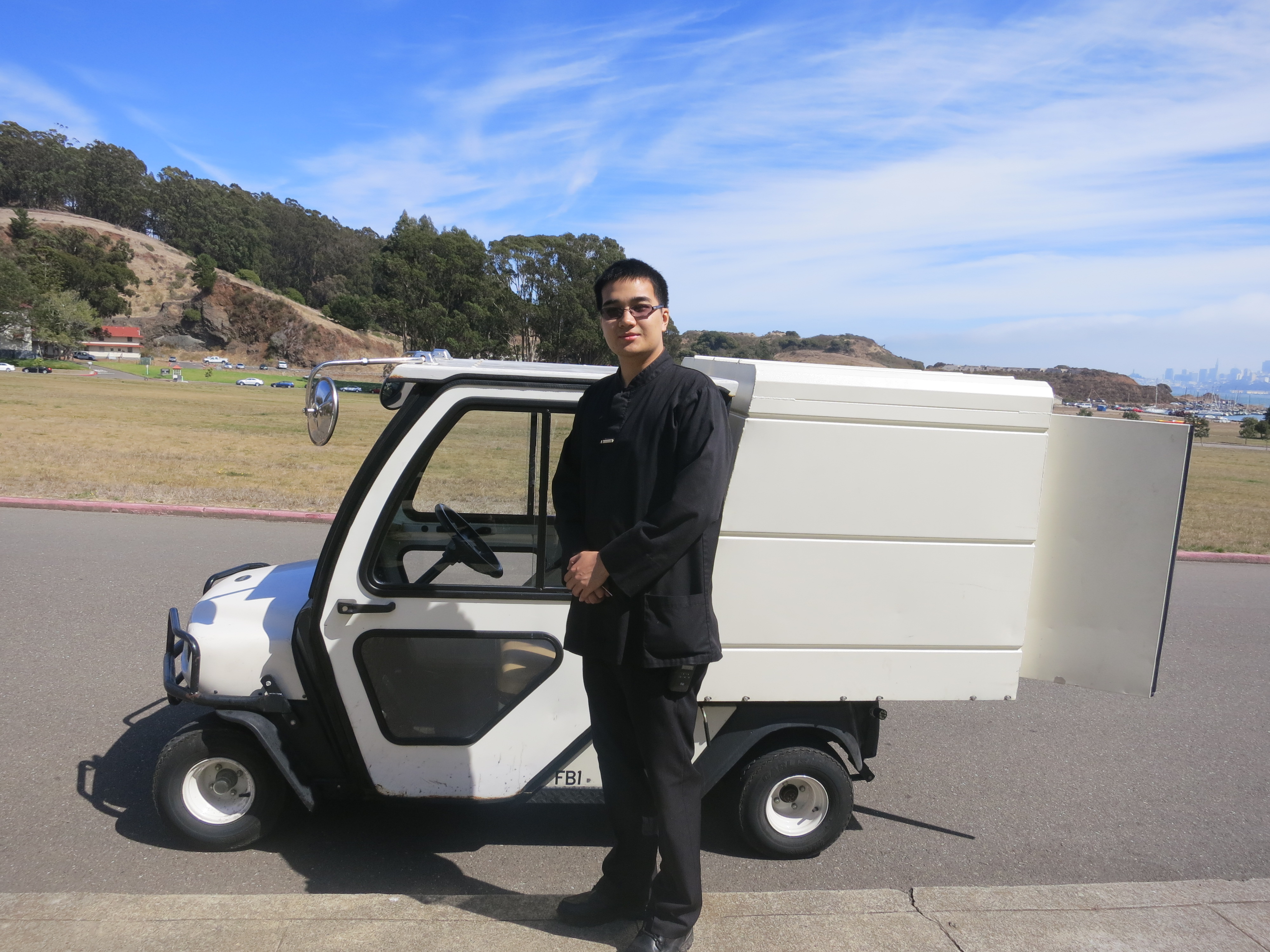

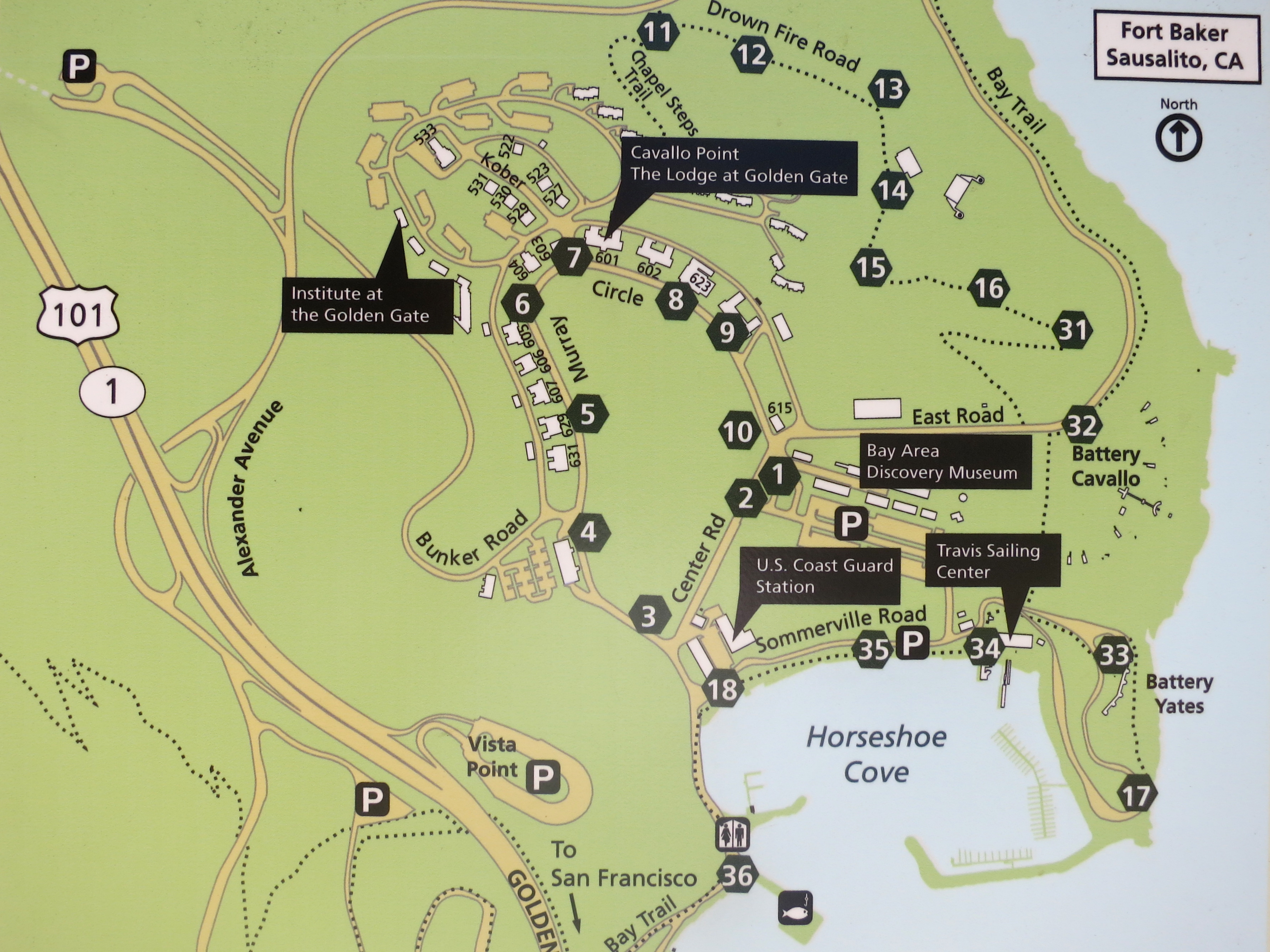

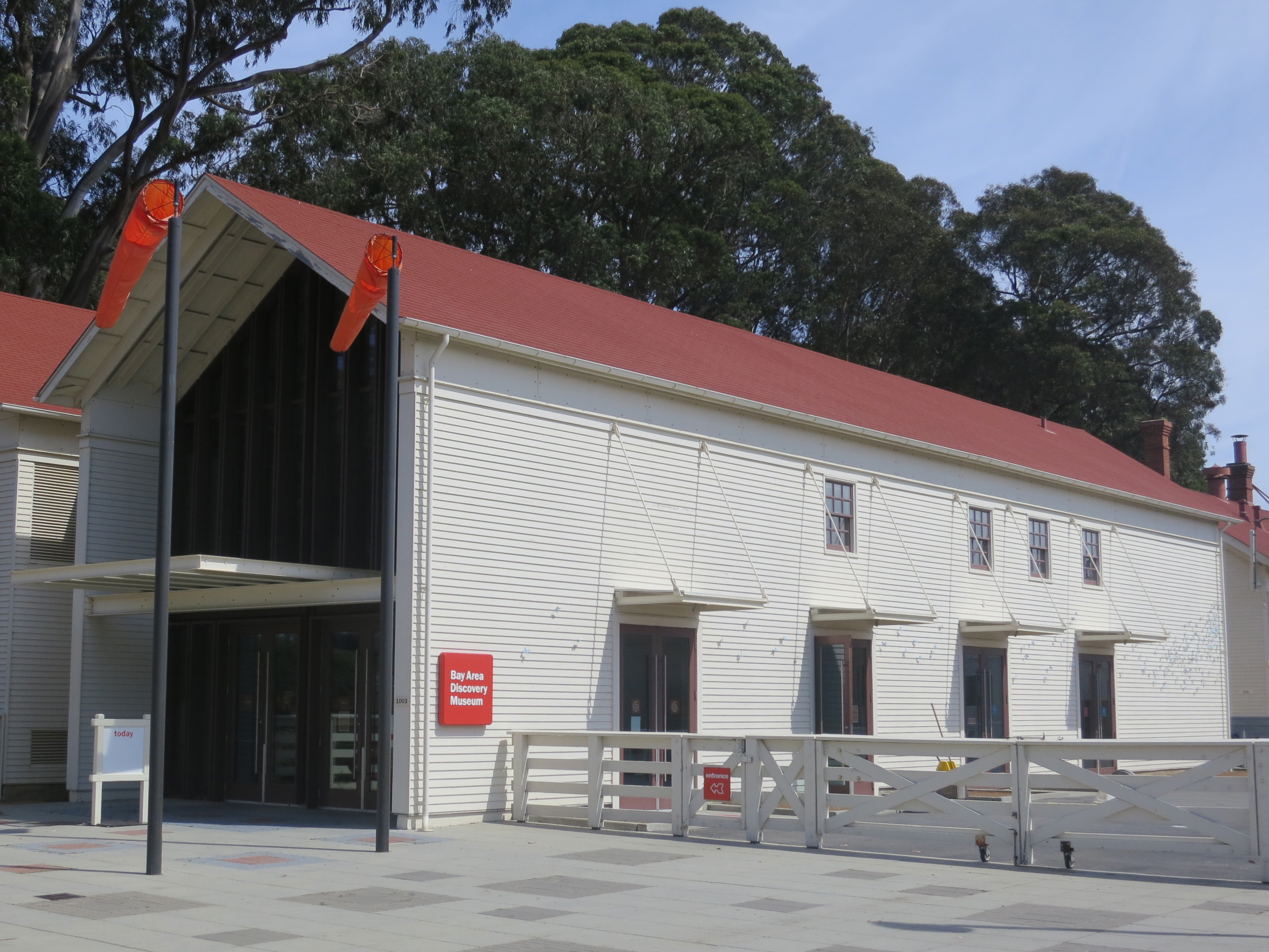

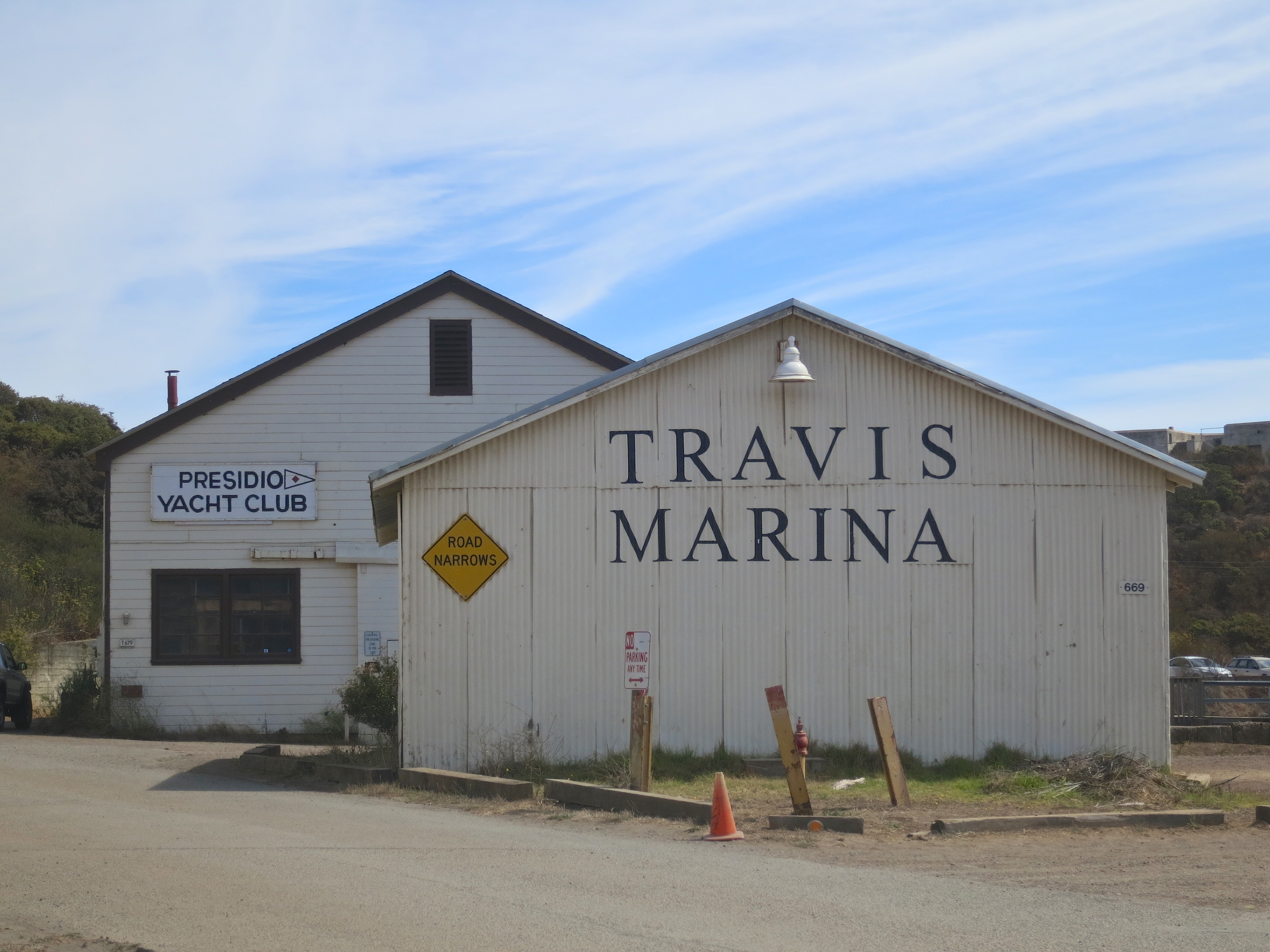

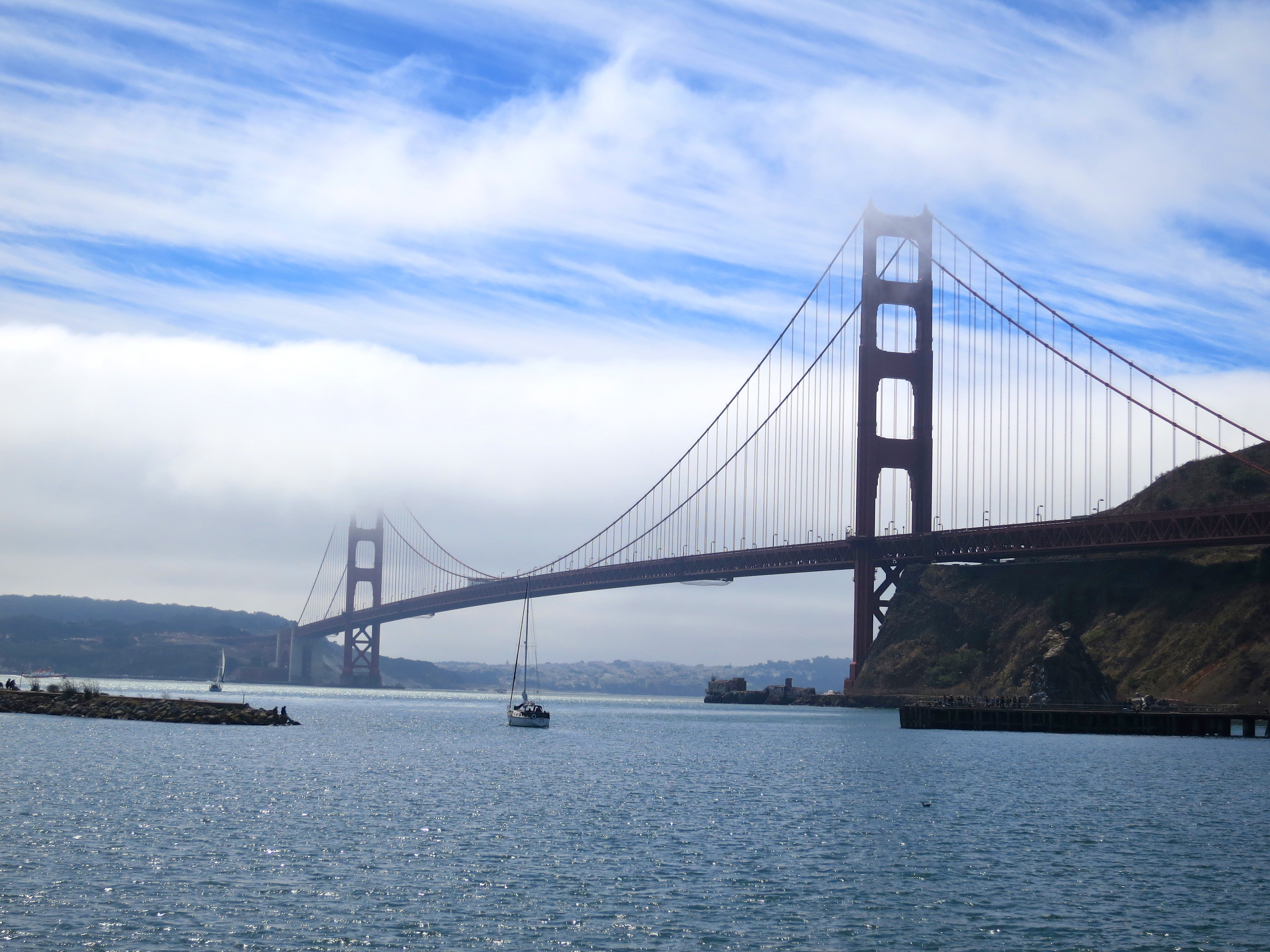

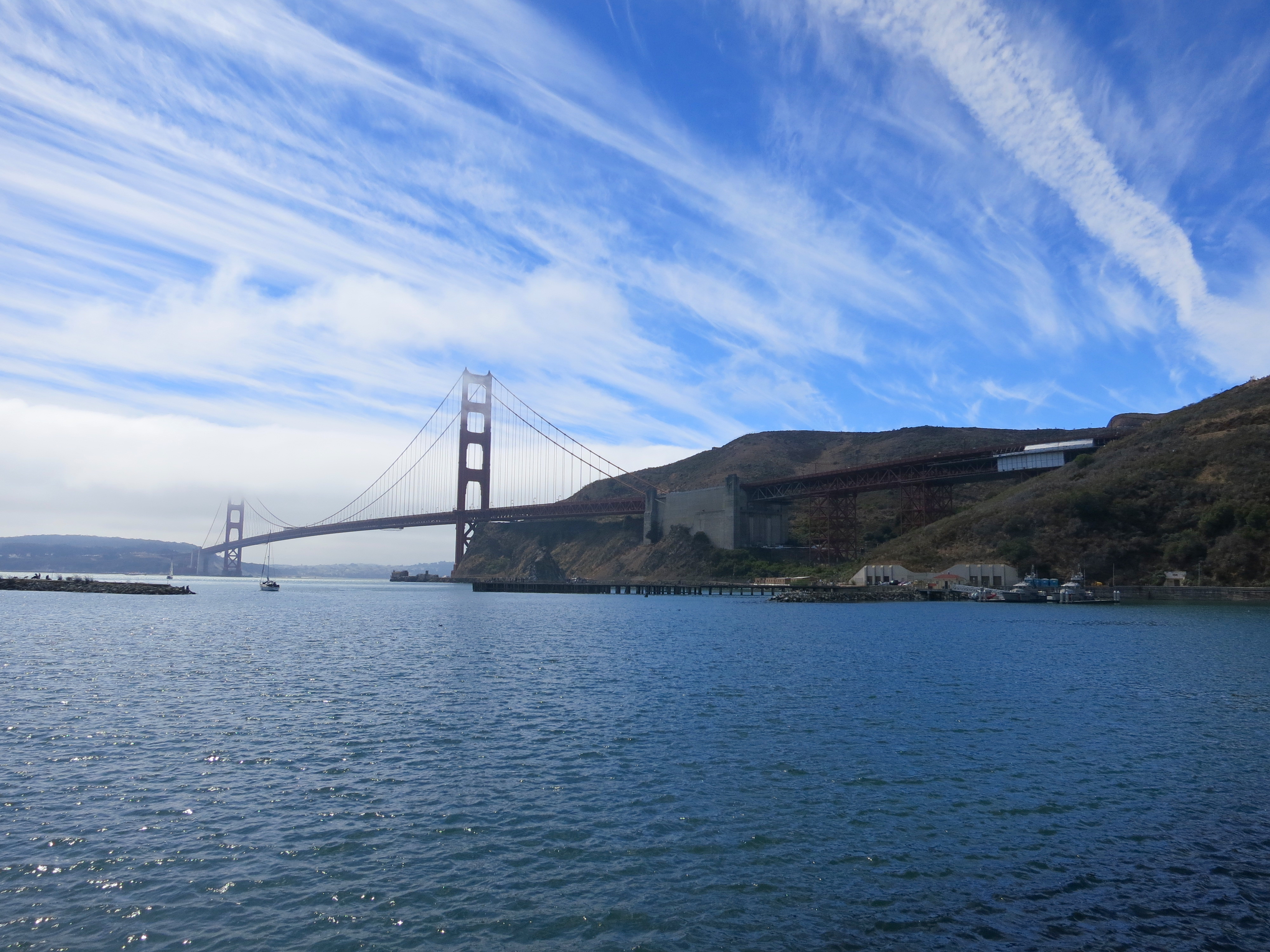

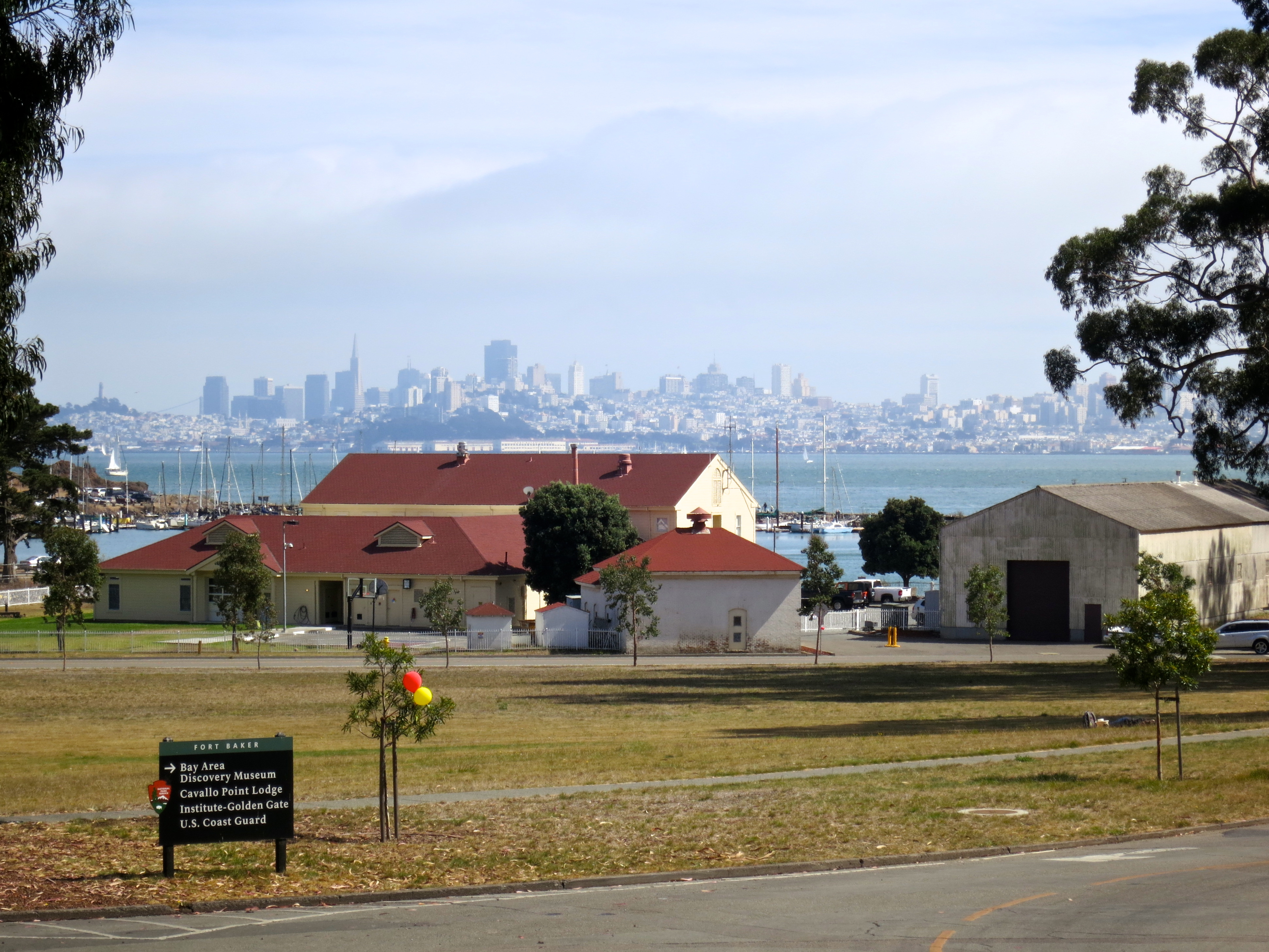

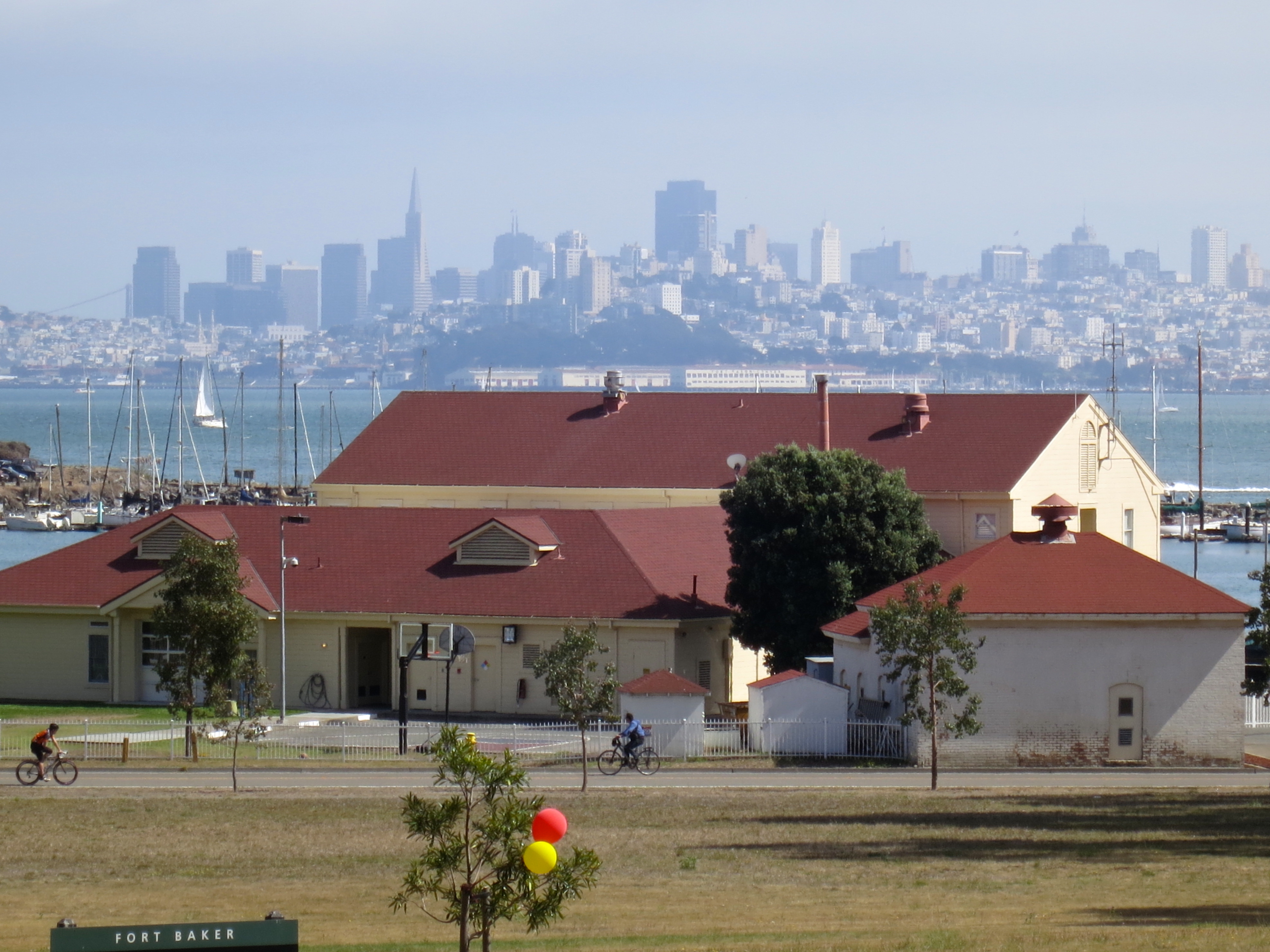

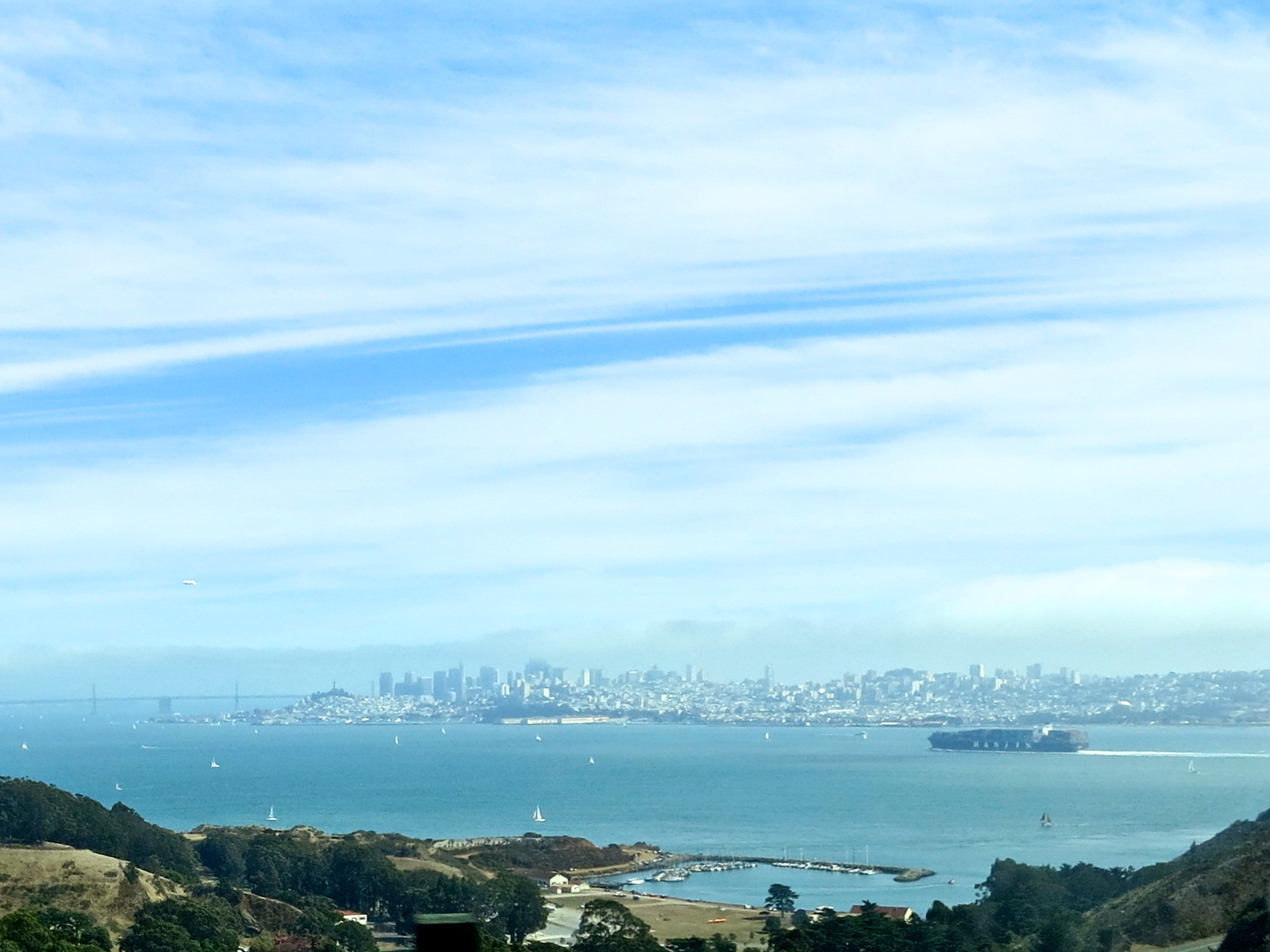

== See also ==
- Fort Baker
- Fort Barry
- Fort Cronkhite
- Baker–Barry Tunnel
