= List of tunnels documented by the Historic American Engineering Record in California =

This is a list of tunnels documented by the Historic American Engineering Record in the US state of California.

== Tunnels ==
Survey No.	Name (as assigned by HAER)	Status	Built	Documented	Carries	Crosses	Location	County	Coordinates
CA-30; CA-199	Central Pacific Railroad, Clipper Gap Tunnel; Central Pacific Transcontinental Railroad, Tunnel 'O'	Abandoned	1873	1984; 1997	Union Pacific Railroad		Clipper Gap	Placer	38°58′47″N 120°59′56″W
CA-86	Big Oak Flat Road Tunnel No. 1	Extant	1937	1991	New Big Oak Flat Road	Mountain spur	Yosemite Village	Mariposa	37°43′31″N 119°42′15″W
CA-87	Big Oak Flat Road Tunnel No. 2	Extant	1937	1991	New Big Oak Flat Road	Mountain spur	Yosemite Village	Mariposa	37°43′24″N 119°41′54″W
CA-88	Big Oak Flat Road Tunnel No. 3	Extant	1938	1991	New Big Oak Flat Road	Mountain spur	Yosemite Village	Mariposa	37°43′03″N 119°43′23″W
CA-105	Wawona Tunnel (Note: See also HAER No. CA-117, "Yosemite National Park Roads and Bridges" for additional documentation)	Extant	1932	1991	SR 41 (Wawona Road)	Turtleback Dome	Yosemite Village	Mariposa	37°42′57″N 119°41′09″W
CA-130-E	Santa Ana River Hydroelectric System, Flume and Tunnel below Fish Screen		1898	1991			Redlands	San Bernardino	
CA-130-G	Santa Ana River Hydroelectric System, Flumes and Tunnels below Sandbox		1898	1991			Redlands	San Bernardino	
CA-130-R	Santa Ana River Hydroelectric System, Abandoned Tunnel	Abandoned	1898	1991	Santa Ana Canal		Redlands	San Bernardino	
CA-139	Forts Baker–Barry Tunnel	Extant	1918	1993	Bunker Road	Lime Point Ridge	Sausalito	Marin	37°50′27″N 122°29′26″W
CA-153-A	Salinas River Project, Cuesta Tunnel	Extant	1942	1994	Aqueduct	Santa Lucia Range	San Luis Obispo	San Luis Obispo	35°21′23″N 120°38′22″W
CA-162	Mile Rock Tunnel	Extant	1915	1994	Storm drain	48th Avenue	San Francisco	San Francisco	37°46′24″N 122°30′32″W
CA-197	Central Pacific Transcontinental Railroad, Tunnel No. 18	Extant	1909	1997	Union Pacific Railroad		Newcastle	Placer	38°52′33″N 121°07′42″W
CA-198	Central Pacific Transcontinental Railroad, Tunnel No. 23	Extant	1909	1997	Union Pacific Railroad		Applegate	Placer	38°58′46″N 120°59′57″W
CA-200	Central Pacific Transcontinental Railroad, Tunnel No. 24	Extant	1910	1997	Union Pacific Railroad		Applegate	Placer	38°58′57″N 120°59′53″W
CA-201	Central Pacific Transcontinental Railroad, Tunnel No. 25	Extant	1910	1997	Union Pacific Railroad		Applegate	Placer	38°59′05″N 120°59′47″W
CA-202	Central Pacific Transcontinental Railroad, Tunnel No. 26	Extant	1909	1997	Union Pacific Railroad		Applegate	Placer	38°59′13″N 120°59′38″W
CA-203	Central Pacific Transcontinental Railroad, Tunnel No. 27	Extant	1910	1997	Union Pacific Railroad		Applegate	Placer	38°59′32″N 120°59′17″W
CA-204	Central Pacific Transcontinental Railroad, Tunnel No. 28	Extant	1910	1997	Union Pacific Railroad	Hotchkiss Hill	Applegate	Placer	39°00′16″N 120°58′48″W
CA-205	Central Pacific Transcontinental Railroad, Tunnel No. 29	Extant	1909	1997	Union Pacific Railroad		Applegate	Placer	39°01′15″N 120°58′22″W
CA-206	Central Pacific Transcontinental Railroad, Tunnel No. 34	Extant	1913	1997	Union Pacific Railroad	Cape Horn	Colfax	Placer	39°06′45″N 120°55′48″W
CA-207	Central Pacific Transcontinental Railroad, Tunnel No. 1	Extant	1868	1997	Union Pacific Railroad		Blue Canyon	Placer	39°14′42″N 120°43′23″W
CA-208	Central Pacific Transcontinental Railroad, Tunnel No. 35	Extant	1924	1997	Union Pacific Railroad		Yuba Pass	Nevada	39°19′24″N 120°35′34″W
CA-209	Central Pacific Transcontinental Railroad, Tunnel No. 36	Extant	1924	1997	Union Pacific Railroad		Yuba Pass	Nevada	39°19′35″N 120°35′19″W
CA-210	Central Pacific Transcontinental Railroad, Tunnel No. 37	Extant	1925	1997	Union Pacific Railroad		Yuba Pass	Nevada	39°19′26″N 120°34′27″W
CA-211	Central Pacific Transcontinental Railroad, Tunnel No. 38	Extant	1924	1997	Union Pacific Railroad		Cisco	Placer	39°18′01″N 120°32′27″W
CA-212	Central Pacific Transcontinental Railroad, Tunnel No. 3	Extant	1868	1997	Union Pacific Railroad		Cisco	Placer	39°18′04″N 120°32′22″W
CA-213	Central Pacific Transcontinental Railroad, Tunnel No. 39	Extant	1924	1997	Union Pacific Railroad		Cisco	Placer	39°18′00″N 120°32′05″W
CA-214	Central Pacific Transcontinental Railroad, Tunnel No. 4	Extant	1868	1997	Union Pacific Railroad		Cisco	Placer	39°18′01″N 120°32′04″W
CA-215	Central Pacific Transcontinental Railroad, Tunnel No. 41	Extant	1925	1997	Union Pacific Railroad	Mount Judah	Donner	Placer	39°18′18″N 120°19′03″W
CA-218	Southern Pacific Railroad Natron Cutoff, Tunnel No. 17	Extant	1909	1997	Southern Pacific Railroad, Cascade Subdivision	Dorris Hill	Dorris	Siskiyou	41°58′18″N 121°54′42″W
CA-219	Southern Pacific Railroad Natron Cutoff, Tunnel No. 18	Extant	1909	1997	Southern Pacific Railroad, Cascade Subdivision	Dorris Hill	Dorris	Siskiyou	41°59′46″N 121°54′42″W
CA-265-G	Figueroa Street Tunnels	Extant	1931	1999	SR 110 (Arroyo Seco Parkway) northbound	Elysian Park	Los Angeles	Los Angeles	34°04′23″N 118°14′02″W
CA-298-AG	Los Angeles Aqueduct, Tunnel Interior	Extant	1913	2001	Los Angeles Aqueduct		Los Angeles	Los Angeles	
CA-315-T	Douglas Aircraft Company Long Beach Plant, Pedestrian Tunnels	Abandoned	1941	2002	Pedestrian ways	SR 19 (Lakewood Boulevard)	Long Beach	Los Angeles	33°49′38″N 118°08′31″W
CA-2259-D	Burlington Northern Santa Fe Railroad, Cajon Subdivision, Tunnel No. 1	Daylighted	1913	2007	BNSF Railway, Cajon Subdivision	Cajon Pass	Devore	San Bernardino	34°20′01″N 117°28′05″W
CA-2259-E	Burlington Northern Santa Fe Railroad, Cajon Subdivision, Tunnel No. 2	Daylighted	1923	2007	BNSF Railway, Cajon Subdivision	Cajon Pass	Devore	San Bernardino	34°19′56″N 117°28′24″W

== See also ==
- List of bridges documented by the Historic American Engineering Record in California
