= Fort Baker =

Former US Army base on the Golden Gate

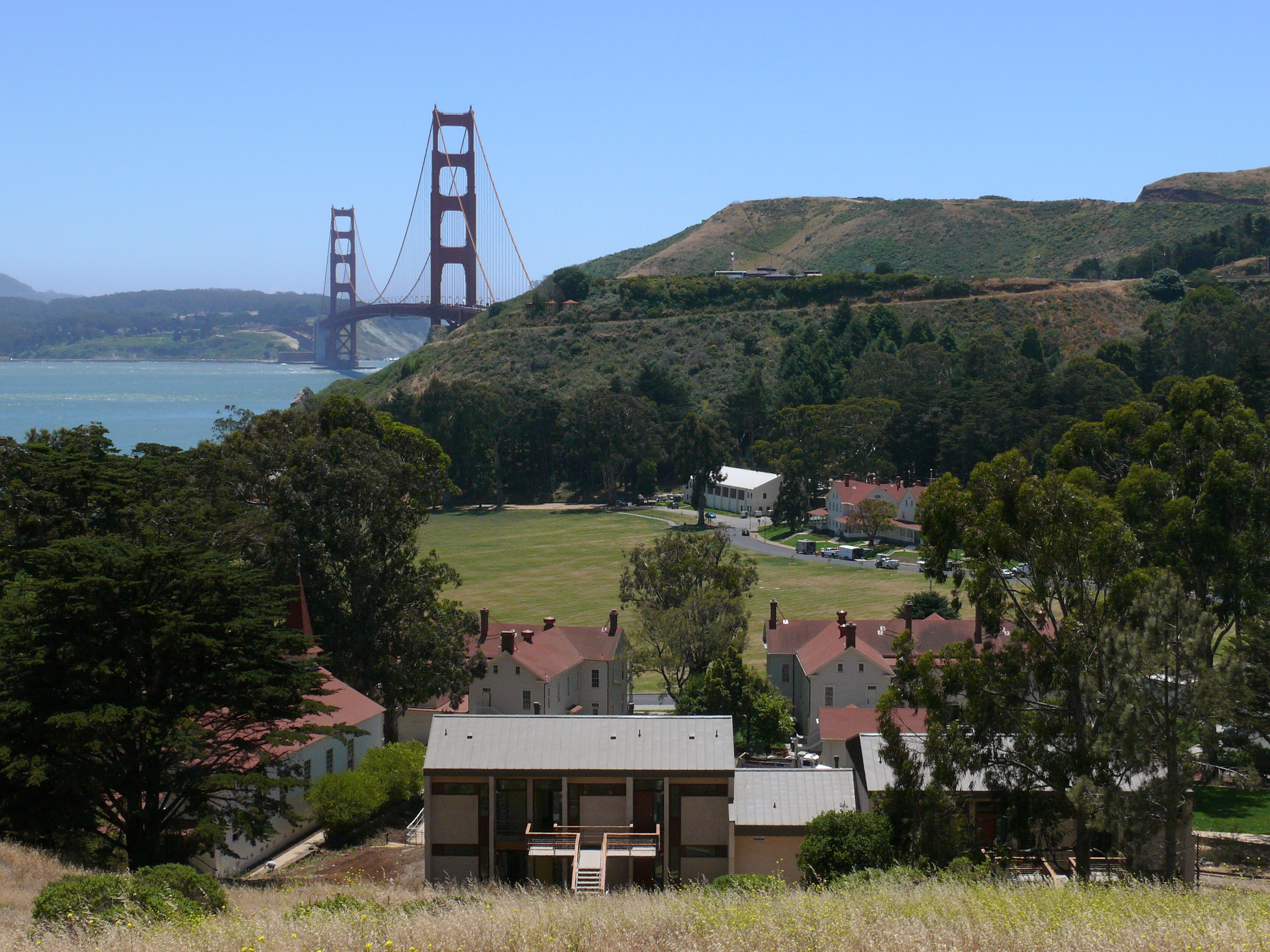
Fort Baker with the Golden Gate Bridge

Fort Baker is one of the components of California's Golden Gate National Recreation Area. The Fort, which borders the City of Sausalito in Marin County and is connected to San Francisco by the Golden Gate Bridge, served as an Army post until the mid-1990s, when the headquarters of the 91st Division moved to Parks Reserve Forces Training Area. It is located opposite Fort Point at the entrance to the San Francisco Bay.

Fort Baker was previously named the Lime Point Military Reservation. It was renamed in 1897.

Fort Baker is named for Edward Dickinson Baker, a former U.S. Senator from Oregon. Active in California politics in the 1850s, Baker lost his life while leading a regiment of Union troops in the Civil War. He and his wife are buried in the San Francisco National Cemetery at the Presidio.

Fort Baker was included in a historic district listing on the National Register of Historic Places in 1973, as part of Forts Baker, Barry, and Cronkhite.

Fort Baker features essentially intact historic structures and landscapes, and is currently under the jurisdiction of the National Park Service (NPS). It is known for its views of the San Francisco Bay.

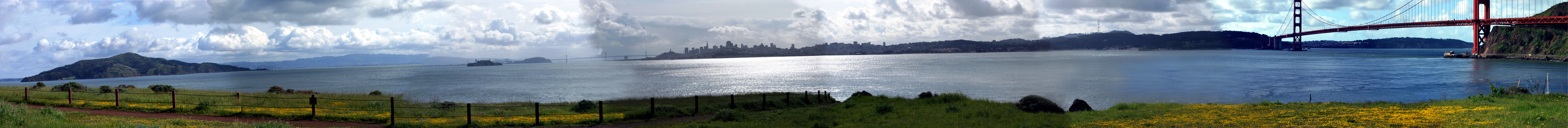
Angel Island, Alcatraz, Yerba Buena Island and the San Francisco–Oakland Bay Bridge, San Francisco, and the Golden Gate Bridge, from the Mano Seca Group bench at Cavallo Point
Fort Baker, on the Marin Peninsula, part of the Forts Baker, Barry, and Cronkhite Historic District, San Francisco Bay Area

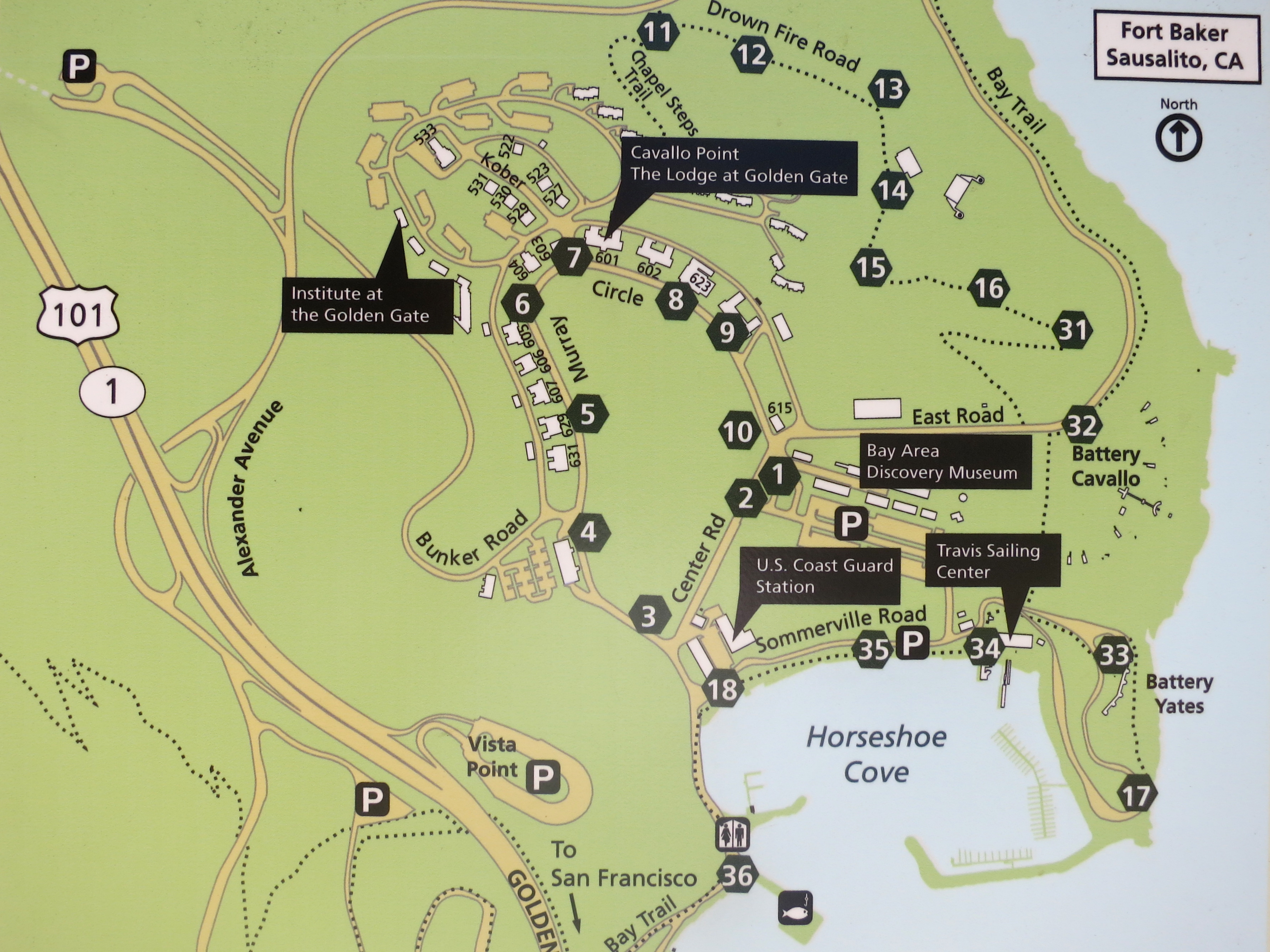
Fort Baker and Horseshoe Cove

== History ==
=== Military usage ===
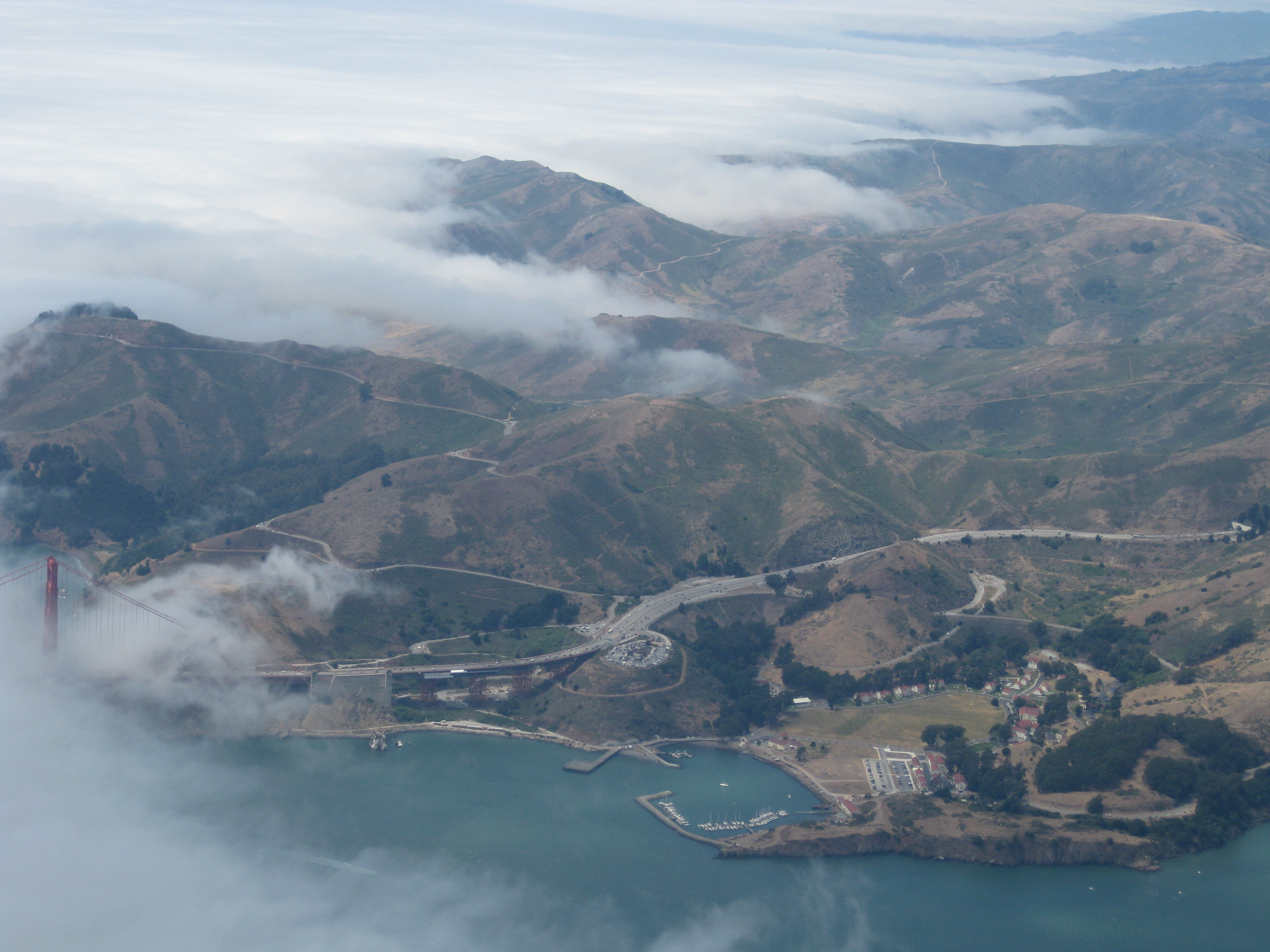
Fort Baker and Marin Headlands in fog

The military history of the area that is now Fort Baker began in 1850 when President Millard Fillmore created The Lime Point Military Reservation, for coastal defense positions and logistic support facilities, on the north side of the Golden Gate, across from Fort Point. However, due to lengthy litigation the land was not acquired by the Federal Government until 1866. Between 1872 and 1876, four barbette batteries were built: at Point Cavallo (Battery Cavallo), on the ridge above Lime Point (Cliff and Ridge Batteries), and on Gravelly Beach to the west (Gravelly Beach Battery). The only buildings on the reservation were barracks-like quarters for construction crews, storehouses, and offices, to the west of Horseshoe Bay.

In 1890 plans were drawn up for modern "Endicott Type" coastal artillery batteries to be built from Point Cavallo to Point Bonita. Four batteries were completed by 1901: Batteries Spencer, Kirby, Duncan, and Orlando Wagner.

In 1897 a tent camp was established where the present Main Post is today, and the reservation was renamed "Fort Baker". Construction of permanent structures began in 1901.

Fort Baker is named for Edward Dickinson Baker, a former U.S. Senator from Oregon. Active in California politics in the 1850s, Baker lost his life while leading a regiment of Union troops, the California Regiment, during the Battle of Ball's Bluff in the Civil War. He and his wife are buried in the San Francisco National Cemetery at the Presidio.

The Baker–Barry Tunnel, a half-mile long tunnel connected Fort Barry and Fort Baker. In June 1937, the tunnel was widened to 20 feet wide.

By December 1942, during World War II, there were 159 structures at Fort Baker, many of them temporary. For example, a temporary frame hospital, built near the beach at the foot of the parade ground, was completed in October 1941 and demolished in 1981.

During WWI and WWII Fort Baker became the headquarters and training command post for the newly formed 91st Division (United States) Army. During WWI the division served in France. In WWII the division served in Italy. Since the soldiers in this division came from the far western states it became known as The Wild West Division. Since the Powder River in Wyoming was a well known river during the army's campaigns against the native American peoples, this river was also known by this era's soldiers. Out of this they developed the custom when an enlisted saluted an officer he would say, "Powder River!" when the officer returned the salute he would say, "Let'er buck!" This became a tradition in the 91st Division which was practiced into the third millennia.

During the 1960s and 1970s the World War II wooden Army Hospital buildings were occupied by the Sixth U.S. Army Medical Laboratory. This medical Laboratory was the Reference Laboratory for all medical facilities in the Sixth Army area excluding Class II facilities such as Letterman General Hospital. The Sixth Army Medical Laboratory also performed testing for rabies, all virology tests, and virology research.

In the mid 1970's the fort became an army reserve training facility/resource called the 91st Training Division with the mission of being staffed with a cadre of leadership personnel (experienced officers and NCO's/Sergeants) and drill instructors so that in the event of a major war—with the draft re-instituted—draftees would be sent to the 91st to receive their basic training (about 9 weeks) followed by advanced infantry training to prepare the draftees for combat. Then the 91st would become an active army infantry division to be deployed to whatever theater of war the army selected for them. In the parlance of soldiers this is called,"The infinite wisdom of the army."

In 2000, the final uniformed elements of the US Army left the Presidio of San Francisco and Fort Baker, a subpost of the Presidio. The 91st Division (Training Support), an Army Reserve unit, moved its headquarters from Fort Baker to Parks Reserve Forces Training Area, in Dublin, California.

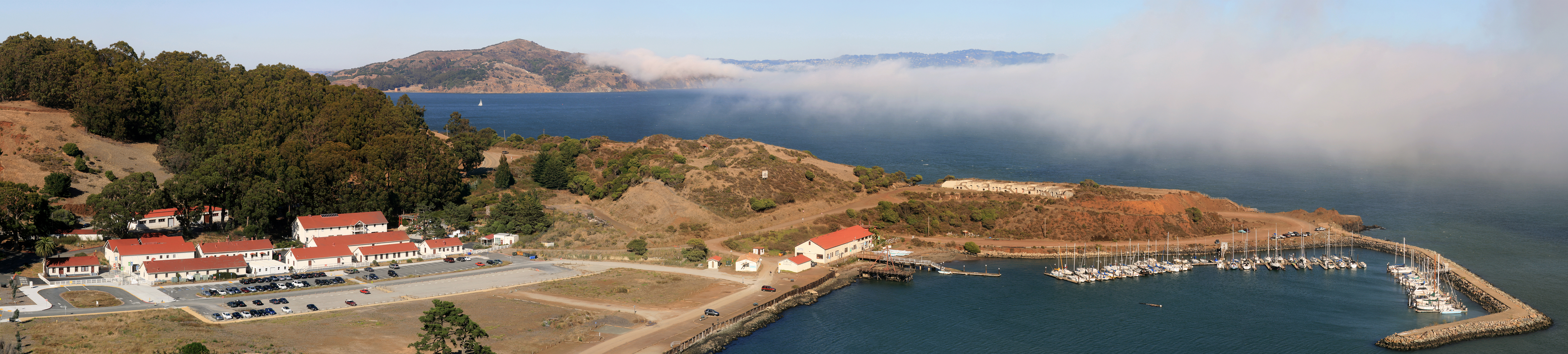
Fort Baker, Angel Island and the fog over San Francisco Bay

=== Current activities ===
Many of the military-built buildings still stand, and current institutions in the area include Coast Guard Station Golden Gate, a motor lifeboat station, the Travis Marina (an Air Force Morale, Welfare and Recreation facility) and Presidio Yacht Club and the Bay Area Discovery Museum. A sustainability and climate change focused think-tank, The Institute at the Golden Gate, has its offices at Fort Baker (37.8380°N 122.4814°W).

==== Cavallo Point conference center ====
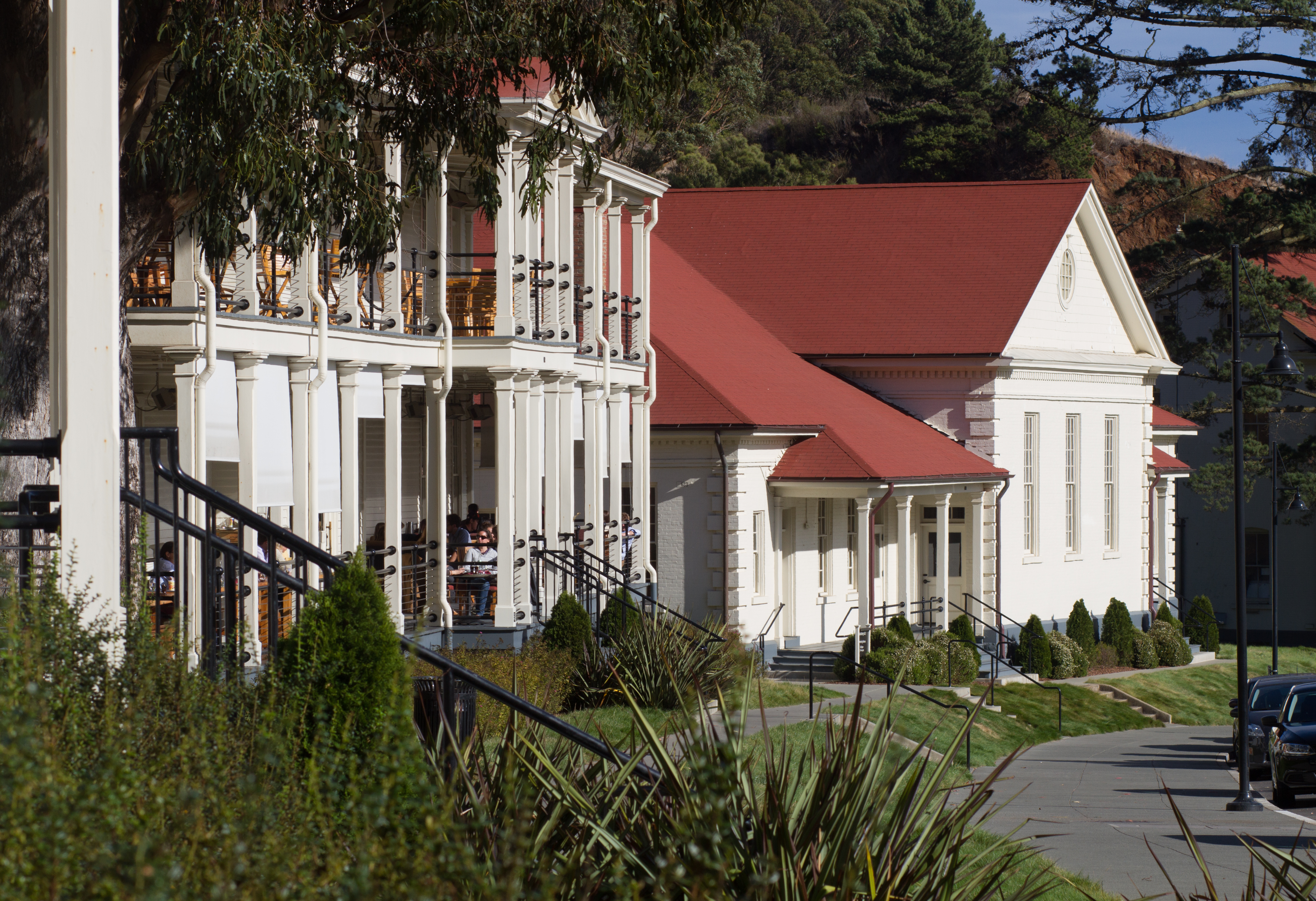
The Cavallo Point Lodge

In January 2005, an agreement was reached by the city of Sausalito and the National Park Service with developers for a retreat and conference center. Construction began in October 2006. Thirteen historic lodging buildings and seven historic commons buildings are being renovated; thirteen new lodging buildings are being built, as well. It is due to open in May 2008. It will have 15,000 square feet (1,400 m^{2}) of indoor space and 10,000 square feet (930 m^{2}) of outdoor event space, for events of 10 to 250 guests, a restaurant seating 100 people ("Murray Circle"), and an 11,000-square-foot (1,000 m^{2}) full-service spa. The 142-room resort will be run by Passport Resorts, which also runs the Post Ranch Inn in Big Sur. The property is undergoing LEED accreditation for its reuse of existing buildings and green designs.

The resort at Cavallo Point is open and hosts guests.

== In popular culture ==
A 22nd-century view of Starfleet Command buildings in Fort Baker from Star Trek: Enterprise

- The site is the home to both Starfleet Headquarters and Starfleet Academy in the Star Trek universe.
- It was also used as the Finish Line of The Amazing Race 2.
- It was featured in the third Dirty Harry film, The Enforcer (1976), for a scene featuring a demonstration of a LAWS rocket.
- The site was used as the Escape from Alcatraz Triathlon Finish Line from 1989 through 1993.

== See also ==
- Mission blue butterfly habitat conservation
