= Applegate, California =

Unincorporated community in California, United States

- Unincorporated community
- Nickname: "the Sierran Tiara'
- Location within the United States
- Coordinates: 39°00′03″N 120°59′33″W
- Country: United States
- State: California
- County: Placer
- Elevation: 2,005 ft (611 m)
- ZIP Code: 95703
- Area codes: 530, 837
- GNIS feature ID: 2582951

Applegate is an unincorporated community in Placer County, California. It is 7.25 mi (11,670 m) south-southwest of Colfax, and 9.3 mi (15.0 km) northeast of Auburn. The city's msl elevation is 2,005 ft (611 m). Its ZIP code is 95703 and its area code 530.

Applegate was originally settled in 1849 by Lisbon Applegate, who came to California with his son, George, from Missouri. Part of a family that first emigrated to America in the 17th century, the Applegates bought acreage above Clipper Gap, California, and established a fruit ranch there. The main house of the Applegate Ranch was where Oliver's gas station and bar sits today. Lisbon eventually returned to Missouri but his son, George W. Applegate, stayed.

As the town grew, it was called Bear River House for its proximity to the Bear River, a short distance northwest. When a post office was established in 1855, the community officially became known as Lisbon in honor of its founder. George W. Applegate became postmaster, and in the 1870s, the settlement was renamed Applegate, also to honor its founder.

At one time, Applegate was a station on the Central Pacific Railroad (later Southern Pacific). When a second track was added in 1929, the station on the eastbound track was named East Applegate. The tracks are separated by about .25 mi (0.40 km).

From Placer GOLD, November 1973; "Applegate is a quiet little town about eight miles northeast of Auburn, rudely severed in two parts by Interstate 80. The town consists of a post office, motel, hardware store, grocery and saloon-and something else..."

== Climate ==
Applegate has a Mediterranean climate that is characterized by cool, wet winters and hot, dry summers (Köppen climate classification Csa).

Climate data for Applegate, California
Month	Jan	Feb	Mar	Apr	May	Jun	Jul	Aug	Sep	Oct	Nov	Dec	Year
Record high °F (°C)	77 (25)	80 (27)	85 (29)	91 (33)	102 (39)	111 (44)	113 (45)	112 (44)	106 (41)	101 (38)	87 (31)	75 (24)	113 (45)
Mean daily maximum °F (°C)	53 (12)	60 (16)	64 (18)	70 (21)	80 (27)	89 (32)	94 (34)	92 (33)	87 (31)	77 (25)	62 (17)	53 (12)	73 (23)
Daily mean °F (°C)	46 (8)	51 (11)	54 (12)	59 (15)	67 (19)	74 (23)	79 (26)	77 (25)	73 (23)	64 (18)	53 (12)	46 (8)	62 (17)
Mean daily minimum °F (°C)	38 (3)	42 (6)	44 (7)	47 (8)	53 (12)	60 (16)	63 (17)	62 (17)	58 (14)	51 (11)	44 (7)	39 (4)	50 (10)
Record low °F (°C)	22 (−6)	21 (−6)	26 (−3)	34 (1)	37 (3)	46 (8)	50 (10)	49 (9)	42 (6)	35 (2)	27 (−3)	20 (−7)	20 (−7)
Average precipitation inches (mm)	4.10 (104)	3.35 (85)	3.21 (82)	1.70 (43)	0.50 (13)	0.21 (5.3)	0.07 (1.8)	0.10 (2.5)	0.46 (12)	1.37 (35)	3.93 (100)	3.03 (77)	18.32 (465)
Source: http://www.myforecast.com/bin/climate.m?city=513677&metric=false
