= Baker–Barry Tunnel =

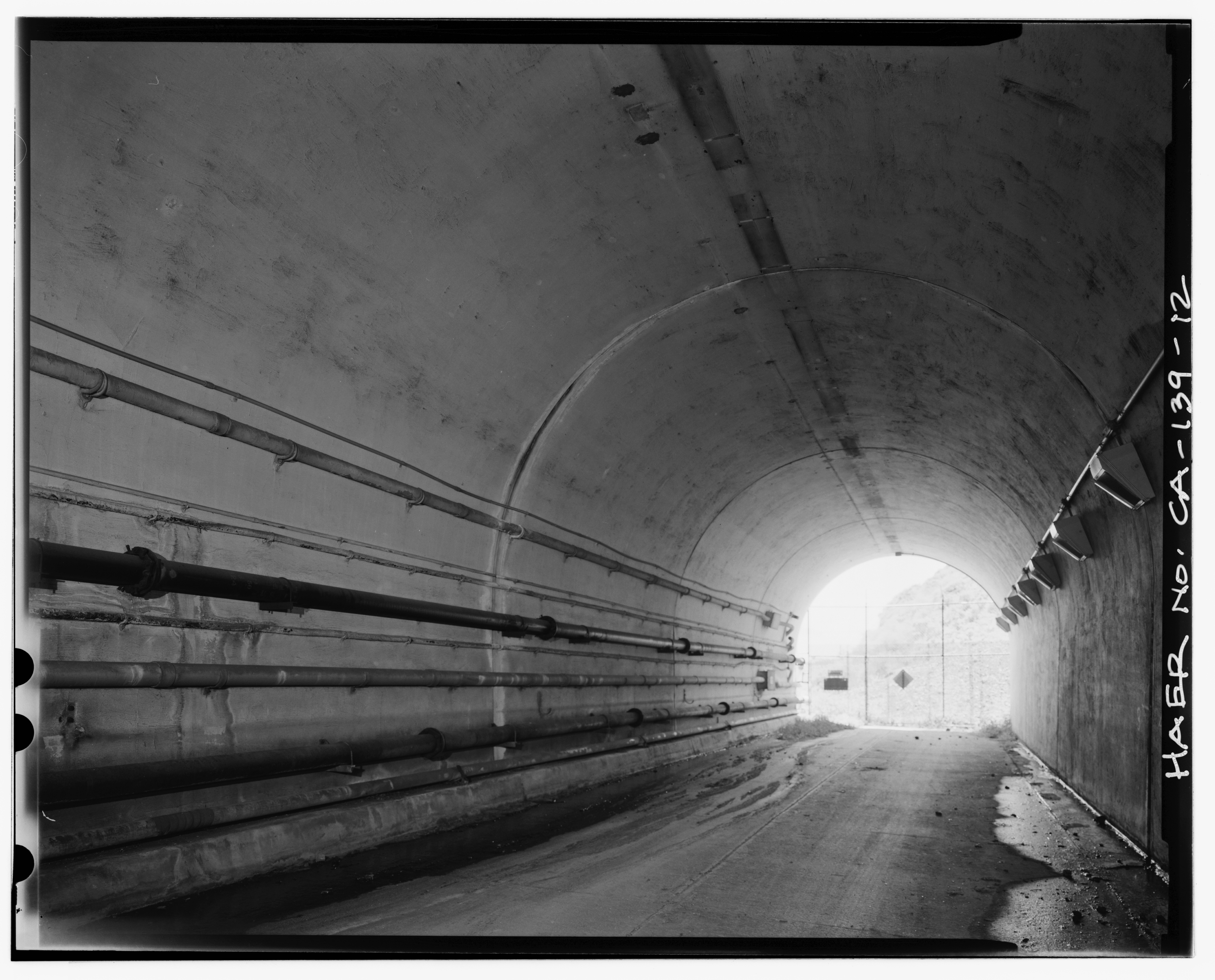
- Eastern end and portal (1993)
- Interactive map of Baker–Barry Tunnel

Overview
- Coordinates: 37.840748°N 122.490448°W
- Status: Active

Operation
- Work began: 1917
- Opened: 1918
- Rebuilt: 1925, 1937, 1994, 2017
- Traffic: 600 (2008)

Technical
- Length: 2,363 ft (720 m)
- No. of lanes: 1 reversible lane
- Forts Baker, Barry, and Cronkhite
- U.S. National Register of Historic Places
- U.S. Historic district
- Location within California Location within the United States
- Nearest city: Sausalito, California
- Area: 25 acres (10 ha)
- Built: 1867
- NRHP reference No.: 73000255
- Added to NRHP: December 12, 1973

The Baker–Barry Tunnel connects the former military bases Fort Barry and Fort Baker in the Marin Headlands of Marin County, California. The bases are now part of the Golden Gate National Recreation Area. The tunnel is also known as the Bunker Road Tunnel for the road that runs through it, or as the Five-Minute Tunnel because it is only wide enough to accommodate a single reversible lane, opened to traffic at either end for five minute intervals.

== History ==
Although geographically close, Forts Baker (on the east) and Barry (on the west) are separated by steep terrain. Travel between the two forts was difficult, and was typically handled by boat. Although a "crude and treacherous" road connected the two forts by land, the post commander complained in 1911 there was no protection to keep users from falling over the side of the road. At certain parts, the road was too narrow for wagon teams to pass each other; the slope into which it was cut had a maximum grade of seventy-five percent, and falling over the side meant a drop of 400 feet (120 m). In response, the War Department allocated $1,500 for board fencing to protect road users at the most dangerous locations. Due to the danger of land travel, a separate school was established at Fort Barry in 1913.

This plan calls for a tunnel 2000 feet long and 8,380 feet of new roadway. It would furnish a direct highway between the two forts with no difficult grades and as nearly unexposed to hostile fire as possible. The road would have great value in peaceful times, as it would eliminate the troubles of landing cargoes from vessels at Fort Barry; but its strategic value in time of war would be far greater.
There is a road between the two forts now, but it is so poor as to be almost worthless in peaceful times and would be pitifully inadequate if a foe's fleet were outside the harbor. The present road is four and one half miles long, its grades are too steep for heavy hauling and the bluffs around which it twists adds to its perils.

— "Extension Improvement Planned", Sausalito News, May 6, 1916

The tunnel was constructed by the U.S. Army after plans were made in late 1915 to expand Fort Barry. Those plans were firmed up in 1916, and construction started in 1917, completing in 1918. The tunnel was rebuilt in 1925 to replace rotting timbers, and in June 1937, the tunnel's width was increased to 20 feet (6 m). The tunnel was listed as a contributing structure for the Forts Baker, Barry, and Cronkhite Historic District on December 12, 1973.

Surveys as early as the 1960s showed the concrete lining had cracked, and due to very long cracks, some exceeding 100 feet (30 m) long, the tunnel was closed in February 1989. Catastrophic failure was not likely, but chunks of concrete had spalled and fallen to the roadway, creating a safety hazard. After a rebuild was completed in 1994, the tunnel reopened in 1995.

The tunnel was again closed for repairs between January and June 2017. Workers sealed cracks in the vintage concrete to reduce seepage, repaved the road, replaced water and sewer lines, and installed energy-efficient LED lighting. Prior to the 2017 rehabilitation, the tunnel was the second-largest consumer of power in the entire Golden Gate National Recreation Area (after district headquarters in San Francisco). During the shutdown, traffic was rerouted to Conzelman Road, a coastal route which is popular among tourists for scenic views of the Golden Gate.

== Design ==
Baker-Barry Tunnel connecting Fort Baker with Fort Barry near Sausalito:
1. Western Portal
2. Eastern Portal

The Baker–Barry Tunnel lies beneath the U.S. 101 (Redwood) highway, just south of where the highway itself goes through a tunnel on the Waldo Grade. It is cut through serpentine rock and as completed in 1918, was supported with a timber structure and featured a macadam road with cobblestone gutters. The cross-section of the tunnel inside the timber supports was 16 by 16 feet (4.9 m × 4.9 m). Timbers were 10 inches (250 mm) square, covered in lagging 2 inches (51 mm) thick, and supports were spaced at 5-foot (1.5 m) intervals. The timber was reused from a grandstand. Just before commencing work, the cost of constructing the tunnel was estimated at US$90,000 (equivalent to $2,660,000 in 2025), including machinery and equipment.

Electric and water lines were run through the tunnel in 1922. The tunnel was rebuilt in 1925 at a cost of $16,618 after much of the lagging and timbers had rotted due to seepage in the tunnel. The rebuild also added galvanized iron and trenches to try to keep moisture out, along with barbed wire fencing to prevent cattle from entering the tunnel. The western end of the tunnel was extended by 167 feet (51 m) as well at this time. A rockslide in the tunnel closed it in late 1926, prompting another round of repairs which began in 1928.

In October 1935, work began under the Works Progress Administration to bore out the tunnel; when completed on June 30, 1937, at a cost of US$358,664 (equivalent to $8,033,000 in 2025), the height was extended to 17 feet (5.2 m) and the width was extended to 20 feet (6.1 m). Workers lined the tunnel with 12 inches (300 mm) of unreinforced concrete. During the widening work, a 50-foot (15 m) long section of the tunnel caved in at the western end of the tunnel on May 31, 1936. The tunnel had been lined with concrete for a length of 1,785 feet (544 m), but the cave-in occurred in the part of the tunnel that was still relying on timber supports. Work on the tunnel did not resume until August 1936. As modified in 1937, the tunnel was still narrower at the western extension completed in 1925, retaining the original width of 16 feet (4.9 m).

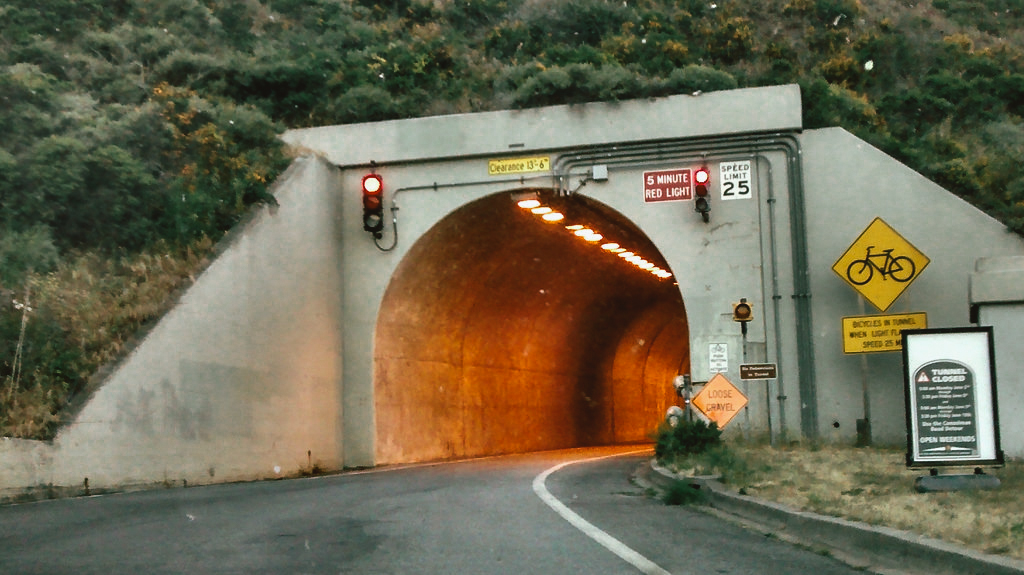
Eastern portal (2014)

Caltrans extended the eastern portion of the tunnel by 50 feet (15 m) when the Redwood Highway was rebuilt in 1953.

The reconstruction in 2017 cost an estimated $7 million, and involved the injection of 45,000 pounds (20,000 kg) of polyurethane resin to stop leaks along with 900 short tons (820 t) of new paving. Electricity consumption was reduced by 40% with the switch to LED lighting. Prior to the 2017 work, the stalactites that had formed from the water seeping through the rock and concrete were removed and displayed at the Exploratorium in San Francisco. The amount of water leaking through the cracks led some to nickname certain areas of the tunnel "the car wash."

=== Traffic notes ===
Automotive traffic through the tunnel is controlled by traffic lights at each end of the tunnel, which allows one-way traffic for five minutes at a time. The single reversible lane for cars is flanked by two bicycle lanes on either side. The five-minute wait is billed as "the longest stoplight in America." Bunker Road itself is named for Col. Paul Bunker, who died in a Japanese prison camp in 1943.

== See also ==
- List of tunnels documented by the Historic American Engineering Record in California
