= Mile Rock Tunnel =

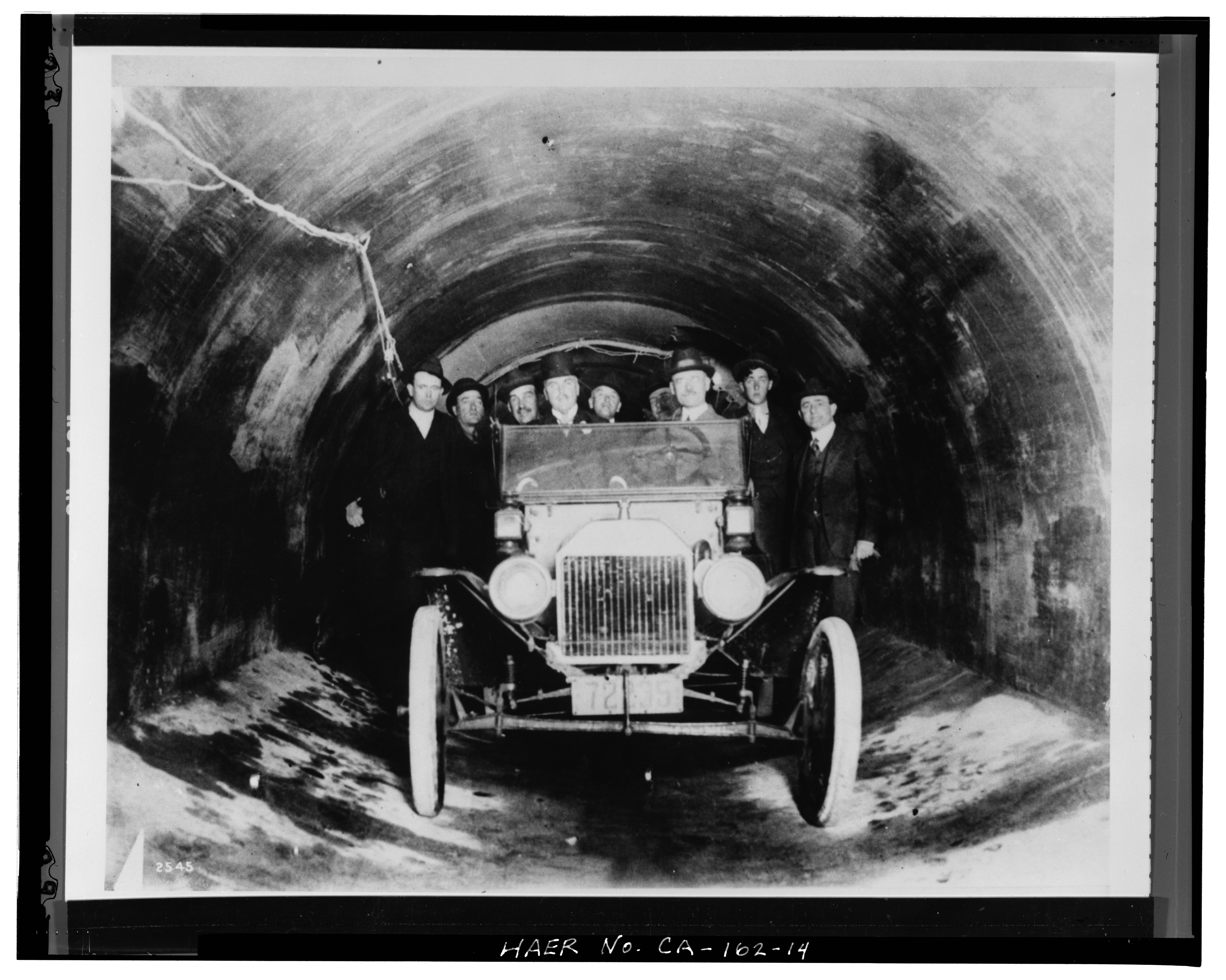
- Inspection party: August 26, 1915

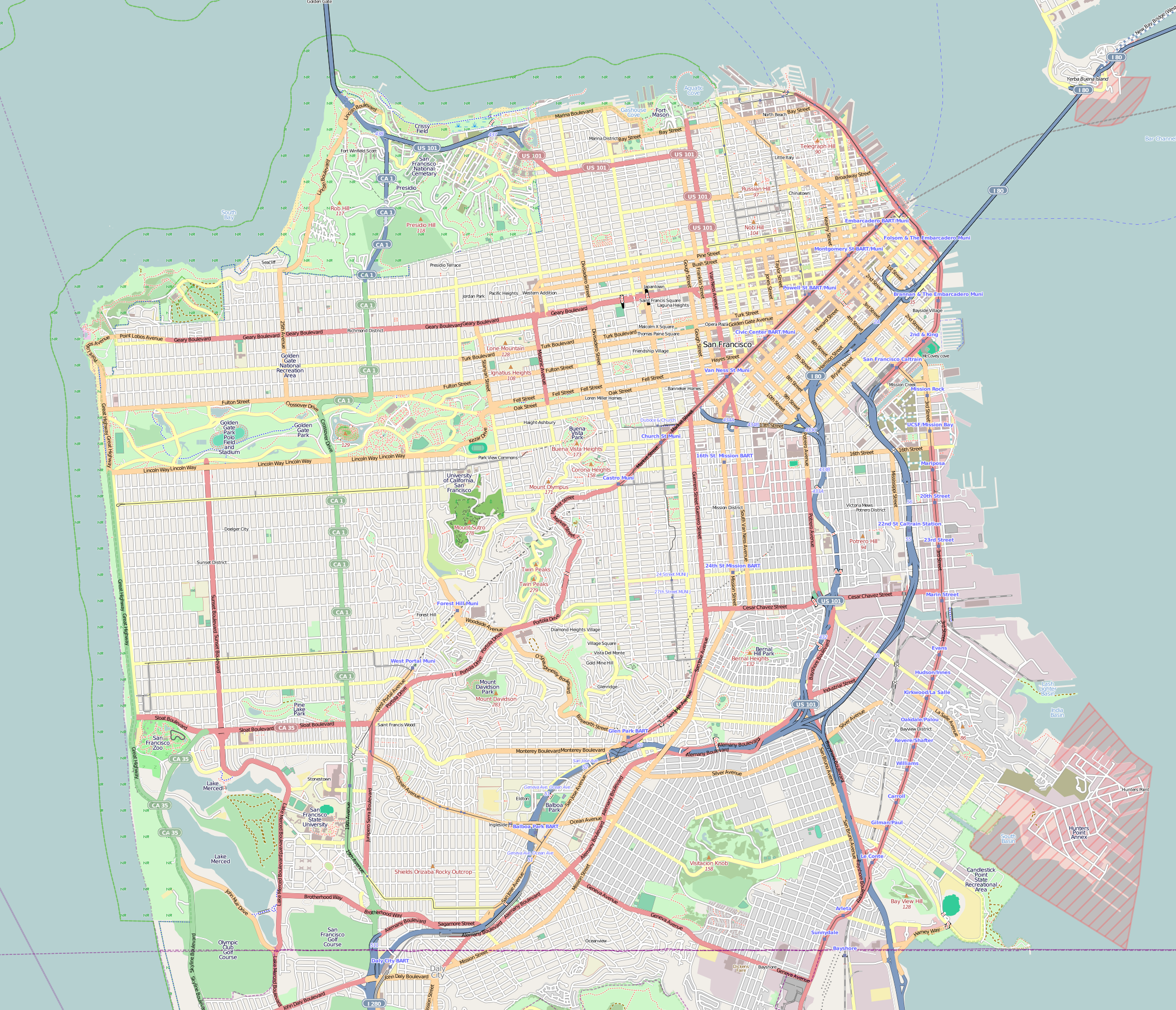

Overview
- Coordinates: 37.773356°N 122.508984°W (south portal)
- Status: Active

Operation
- Opened: 1915
- Character: sewer tunnel (currently used for storm drain overflow)

Technical
- Length: 4,233 feet (1,290 m) long

Mile Rock Tunnel is a utility tunnel in San Francisco, in the U.S. state of California that was originally constructed as the storm sewer outfall draining the Sunset, West Mission, Richmond, and Ingleside districts.

The tunnel travels from Cabrillo Street northward under 48th Ave to its outfall near Mile Rock Beach.

== History ==
The Mile Rock Tunnel started construction in 1914 and was completed by 1915. The contract was initially awarded to Edward Malley, but he stopped work after five months because of the high cost of insurance; R.C. Storrie and Company, who were responsible for other large tunneling projects including the Twin Peaks Tunnel, assumed responsibility for the work in January 1915.

Mayor 'Sunny Jim' Rolph and other officials, including City Engineer M.M. O'Shaughnessy performed an inspection of the completed tunnel using a car on August 26, 1915. The tunnel was fitted with temporary structures and lighting to allow the car to enter without the threat of flooding from the outlet, but as it was not wide enough to allow the car to turn around, the return trip was conducted in reverse gear.

In 1995, the outfall portion of the Mile Rock Tunnel was connected to the new Richmond Transport tunnel, to be used as an emergency combined sewer overflow.

== Design ==
The tunnel was constructed by a combination of cut-and-cover (through soil) and boring (through rock) methods.

== See also ==
- List of tunnels documented by the Historic American Engineering Record in California
