= Richmond Transport tunnel =

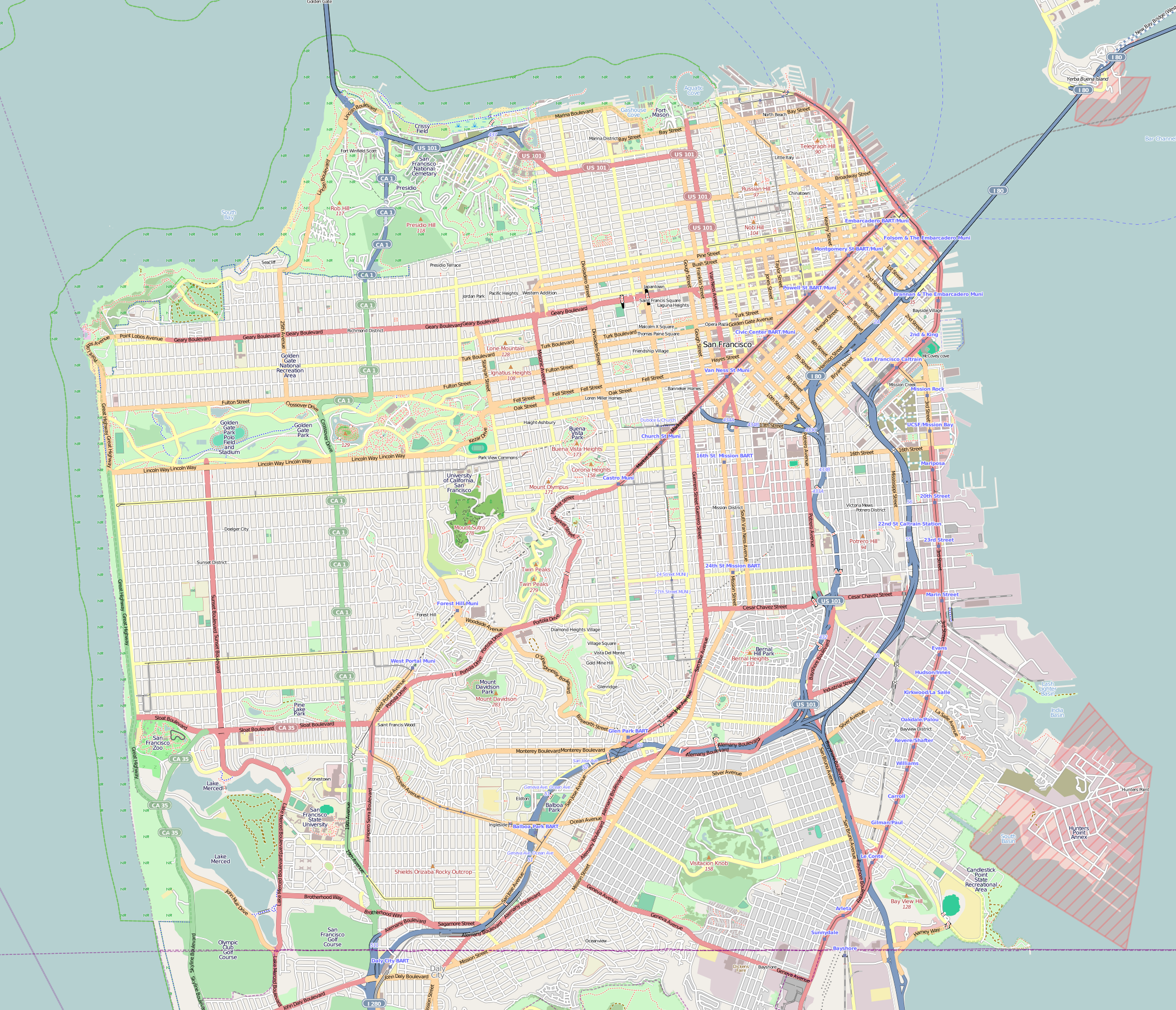

Overview
- Other name(s): El Camino Del Mar tunnel
- Coordinates: 37.787654°N 122.483369°W (east portal)
- Status: Active

Operation
- Opened: December 7, 1995 (construction) August 1995 (operation)
- Character: combined sewer tunnel

Technical
- Length: 10,200 feet (3,100 m) long
- Tunnel clearance: 14 feet (4.3 m) diameter

The Richmond Transport tunnel is a 10,200-foot-long (3,100 m), 14-foot diameter (4.3 m) combined sewer transport and storage tunnel in San Francisco, California. The tunnel travels from its east portal in the Sea Cliff neighborhood westward under Lincoln Park and Lands End then southward to the north point of the Great Highway.

== History ==
The tunnel was constructed in 1995 as part of San Francisco's Wastewater Master Plan. It serves both as sewage transport and as storage with a capacity of 10,000,000 US gallons (38,000 m^{3}). As part of the Richmond transport project, the tunnel connects to the previously abandoned Mile Rock Tunnel outfall and uses it as an emergency overflow when capacity is exceeded.

In December 1995, state Senator Quentin Kopp and Lincoln Park Neighborhood Association president Jake Murdock blamed the tunnel construction for a nearby sewer line collapse and subsequent sinkhole. The engineering consulting firm Exponent hired by the city found that "cracks in the sewer developed when a series of events converged, including constriction of stormwater flow in pipes and construction activities around the sewers."
