= Cisco, California =

Unincorporated community in California, United States

Cisco
- Unincorporated community
- Location in California Cisco (the United States)
- Coordinates: 39°18′06″N 120°32′49″W
- Country: United States
- State: California
- County: Placer County
- Elevation: 5,940 ft (1,810 m)

Population (2016)
  - Total: 0

Cisco (formerly, Heaton Station) is an unincorporated community in Placer County, California. Cisco is located on the Union Pacific Railroad, 0.5 miles (0.8 km) south-southwest of Cisco Grove. It lies at an elevation of 5938 feet (1810 m).

The Cisco post office operated from 1866 to 1941. The name Cisco honors John J. Cisco, treasurer of the Central Pacific Railroad.

The folk singer and songwriter Cisco Houston, who later befriended and toured extensively with Woody Guthrie, derived his nickname from Cisco, California.

Cisco, California was the fictional location of the opening and end of the movie Vanishing Point (1971). The actual filming location was in Cisco, Utah.

Very little is left of Cisco today, and it has no actual population. Most Cisco residents have moved to the nearby locales of Cisco Grove and Kingvale.

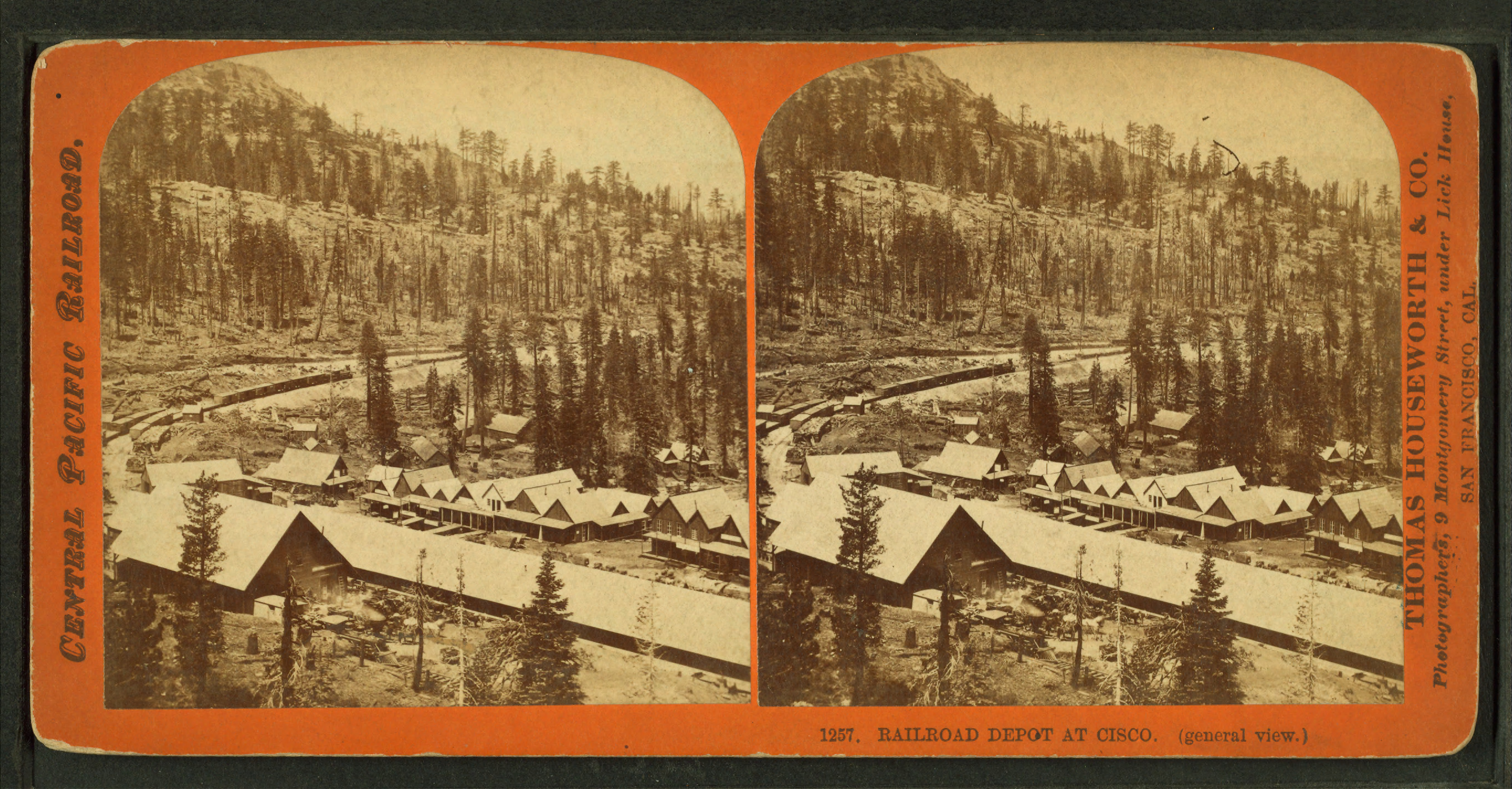
Stereo card view of the CPRR's Cisco Depot during late spring time c. 1868

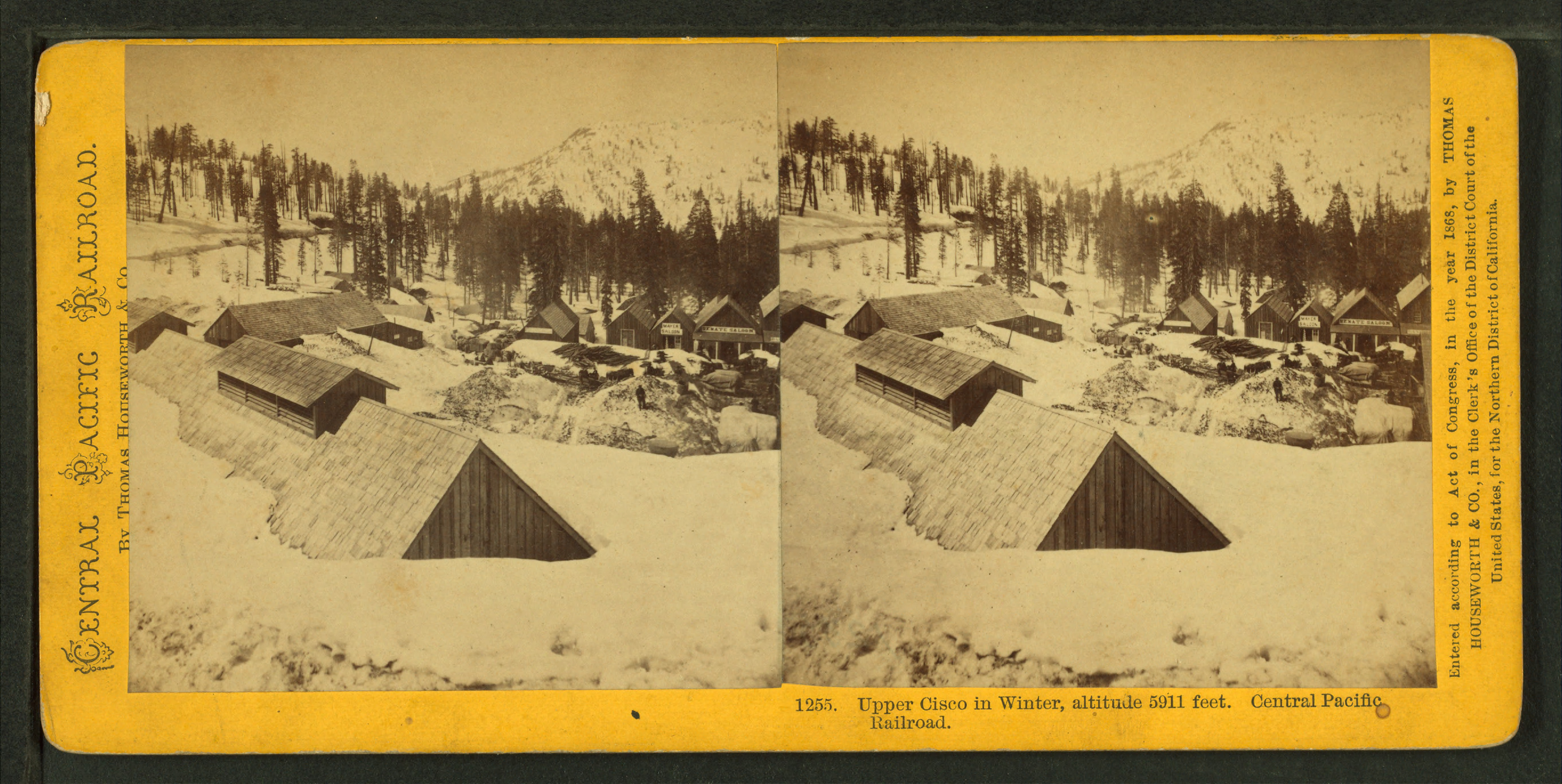
Stereo view of the Cisco Depot from a similar vantage during winter time c. 1869

== Climate ==
This region experiences warm (but not hot) and dry summers, with no average monthly temperatures above 71.6 °F. According to the Köppen Climate Classification system, Cisco has a warm-summer Mediterranean climate.

According to the Köppen Climate Classification system, Bear Valley Springs has a semi-arid climate, abbreviated "BSk" on climate maps with a climate similar to Tehachapi, CA.

Climate data for Cisco, California (1961-1972)
Month	Jan	Feb	Mar	Apr	May	Jun	Jul	Aug	Sep	Oct	Nov	Dec	Year
Mean daily maximum °F (°C)	39.9 (4.4)	41.2 (5.1)	46.9 (8.3)	51.5 (10.8)	58.9 (14.9)	67.4 (19.7)	78.8 (26.0)	78.4 (25.8)	72.3 (22.4)	60.9 (16.1)	49.5 (9.7)	40.7 (4.8)	57.2 (14.0)
Mean daily minimum °F (°C)	20.6 (−6.3)	21.6 (−5.8)	27.1 (−2.7)	30.9 (−0.6)	37.3 (2.9)	44.8 (7.1)	48.2 (9.0)	47.0 (8.3)	41.9 (5.5)	34.0 (1.1)	28.0 (−2.2)	21.3 (−5.9)	33.6 (0.9)
Average precipitation inches (mm)	14.1 (360)	12.3 (310)	11.7 (300)	6.6 (170)	4.3 (110)	1.5 (38)	0.2 (5.1)	0.3 (7.6)	0.9 (23)	4.2 (110)	8.9 (230)	14.2 (360)	79.2 (2,023.7)
Average snowfall inches (cm)	65.7 (167)	45.0 (114)	45.2 (115)	30.9 (78)	6.1 (15)	0.6 (1.5)	0.0 (0.0)	0.0 (0.0)	0.9 (2.3)	3.0 (7.6)	25.9 (66)	65.5 (166)	288.8 (732.4)
