= Clipper Gap, California =

Unincorporated community in California, United States

Clipper Gap
- Unincorporated community
- Location in California Clipper Gap (the United States)
- Coordinates: 38°58′10″N 121°01′03″W
- Country: United States
- State: California
- County: Placer County
- Elevation: 1,677 ft (511 m)

Clipper Gap (also, Clippergap) is an unincorporated community in Placer County, California. Clipper Gap is located 6 miles (9.7 km) north-northeast of Auburn. It lies at an elevation of 1676 feet (511 m).

The first transcontinental railroad reached Clipper Gap in 1865, and local mills supplied black powder and lime for use in railroad construction. The town began to decline after the railroad's construction was complete, and the town later became a service stop on the Lincoln Highway. Today Clipper Gap is a rural residential area.

The Clipper Gap post office opened in 1866, changed its name to Clippergap in 1894, reverted its name to Clipper Gap in 1950, and closed permanently in 1960.
